= List of Care Bears books =

Care Bears
- Author: Various, including: Peggy Kahn (1980s, 1992); Bobbi Katz (1980s, 1991); Francis Ann Ladd (2000s); Quinlan B. Lee (2000s); Sonia Sander (2000s)
- Illustrator: Various, including: Tom Cooke (1980s); Carolyn Bracken (1980s); Bobbi Barto (1980s); Jay Johnson (2000s); Jeff Harter (2007–2008)
- Country: United States
- Language: English
- Genre: Children's fiction
- Publisher: United States: Random House (1983–1992); Parker Brothers (1983–1985); Scholastic Books (2003–present)
- Published: 1983–present

Created in 1981 by the U.S. greeting card company American Greetings, the Care Bears are a group of characters that have appeared in various media. Since early 1983, various companies in the Americas, Europe and Israel have published books based on the franchise. In the United States, the Care Bears' books have been available through Random House, Parker Brothers and Scholastic Books.

== English-language books ==
=== Parker Brothers ===
Parker Brothers, a board game company then owned by General Mills, launched its book publishing division in February 1983; its first series consisted of six books featuring the Care Bears. Various authors contributed to the resulting series, Tales from the Care Bears; Tom Cooke illustrated most of the stories. At the time of publication, various trade publications took note of Parker Brothers' unique marketing strategy for the books. On October 30, 1987, Great Britain's Octopus Books released a book under this title (ISBN 0-7064-3053-0), containing Amelia Hubert's Sweet Dreams for Sally and Evelyn Mason's A Sister for Sam.

Parker Brothers spent US$1 million in advertising on the original six-book series, which was made to promote the Care Bears characters. According to a company spokesperson, the stories would demonstrate "love, caring, dreams, happiness, friendship, wishes, and feelings". The series made its debut at the 1983 American International Toy Fair, along with other Care Bears products. John Keller, editorial director for the books, commented on their creation:

The old way was to give authors their head. We, on the other hand, make up a list of, say, thirty interesting plot ideas, and then we do consumer testing ... Once I have the rankings, I call up my pool of authors and give them a plot to work with, and a style sheet explaining the characters. And then I say, "Please write 2,500 words filled with verve and excitement."

==== Tales from the Care Bears ====
Title	Author	Release date	Illustrator	ISBN
Sweet Dreams for Sally	Amelia Hubert	March 1983	Tom Cooke	0-910313-01-6
The Witch Down the Street	Stephanie Morgan	March 1983	Tom Cooke	0-910313-02-4
The Trouble with Timothy	Margaret Ludlow	April 1983	Tom Cooke	0-910313-00-8
Caring Is What Counts	Ward Johnson	June 1983	Tom Cooke	0-910313-05-9
A Friend for Frances	Geoffrey Wills	June 1983	Tom Cooke	0-910313-04-0
A Sister for Sam	Evelyn Mason	June 1983	Tom Cooke	0-910313-03-2
Being Brave Is Best	Elizabeth Winthrop	February 1984	Tom Cooke	0-910313-19-9
Ben's New Buddy	Ward Johnson	February 1984	Tom Cooke	0-910313-16-4
The Care Bears Battle the Freeze Machine	Arthur S. Rosenblatt	February 1984	Joe Ewers	0-910313-15-6
The Magic Words	Maria B. Murad	February 1984	Dick Murgado	0-910313-17-2
Your Best Wishes Can Come True	Phyllis Fair Cowell	February 1984	Joe Ewers	0-910313-18-0

==== Other books ====
Title	Author	Release date	Illustrator	ISBN
Care Bears: Book of Favorite Bedtime Stories	Various	February 1984	Tom Cooke	0-910313-20-2
The Baby Hugs Bear and Baby Tugs Bear Alphabet Book	Phyllis Fair Cowell	October 1984	Tom Cooke	0-910313-72-5
The Baby Hugs Bear and Baby Tugs Bear Counting Book	Dorothy F. Haas	October 1984	Tom Cooke	0-910313-71-7
The Baby Hugs Bear and Baby Tugs Bear Look and Find Book	Evelyn Mason	October 1984	Tom Cooke	0-910313-73-3
The Best Prize of All	Mark Taylor	April 1985	Joe Ewers	0-910313-86-5
A Walk to Grow On	Louise Plummer and Louise Taylor	April 1985	Tom Cooke	0-910313-85-7
The Care Bears Movie: Meet the Care Bear Cousins	N/A	April 1985 (Note: Re-issued in October 1985 by Childrens Press (ISBN 0-516-09029-1).)	N/A	0-910313-98-9 (USA); ISBN 1-85071-185-2 (UK)
Keep On Caring	Arthur S. Rosenblatt	April 1985 (Note: Re-issued in October 1985 by Childrens Press (ISBN 0-516-09027-5).)	N/A	0-910313-84-9
Care Bears Sing and Play: Follow–the–Lights Piano Songbook	Nikki Bataille Lange	October 30, 2006	Kevin Deters	1-57791-309-4

=== Random House ===
In 1983, the U.S. publishing company Random House was granted paperback rights to books in the Care Bears franchise through American Greetings and General Mills, as Parker Brothers was unable to secure the exclusive publishing rights at the time. Bruce Jones, a Parker Brothers staffer, could not secure the exclusive publishing rights, and had to settle for a split license with Random House. During the mid-1980s, Dorsey Laboratories promoted its Triaminic cough medicine through a Random House publication, The Care Bears Help Chase Colds; this promotion helped sell over 2 million units of the product, along with a free copy of said book.

Title	Author	Release date	Illustrator	ISBN
Birthday Bear's Book of Birthday Poems	Bobbi Katz	May 12, 1983	Louise Walton; Deborah Borgo	0-394-85658-9
The Care Bears and the New Baby	Peggy Kahn	May 12, 1983	Robert Blake	0-394-85845-X
The Care Bears' Book of ABC's	Peggy Kahn	May 12, 1983	Carolyn Bracken	0-394-85808-5
The Care Bears' Garden	Della Maison	May 12, 1983	Carolyn Bracken	0-394-85827-1
The Care Bears Help Out	Eleanor Hudson	May 12, 1983	J.M.L. Gray	0-394-85842-5
Meet the Care Bears	Ali Reich	May 12, 1983	J.M.L. Gray	0-394-85844-1
The Care Bear Bath Book	Pat Sustendal	June 12, 1983	Pat Sustendal	0-394-86071-3
The Care Bears and the Terrible Twos	Ali Reich	September 12, 1983	Carolyn Bracken	0-394-85918-9
Wish Bear's Book of Wonderful Wishes	Peggy Kahn	September 12, 1983	Carolyn Bracken	0-394-85919-7
The Care Bears' Book of Bedtime Poems	Bobbi Katz	October 12, 1983	Dora Leder	0-394-85956-1
Ten Little Care Bears (Note: The online library catalog database WorldCat lists the full title of this book as Ten Little Care Bears Counting Book: A Learn to Count Game with Doors to Open and Rhymes to Find.)	Peggy Kahn	October 12, 1983	Bobbi Barto	0-394-86088-8
The Care Bears' Book of Colors	Peggy Kahn	April 12, 1984	Bobbi Barto	0-394-86444-1
The Care Bears' Book of Feelings	Peggy Kahn	April 12, 1984	Carolyn Bracken	0-394-86447-6
The Care Bears in Town	Peggy Kahn	April 12, 1984	Bobbi Barto	0-394-86446-8
The Care Bears Up and Down	Peggy Kahn	April 12, 1984	Carolyn Bracken	0-394-86445-X
Month by Month: A Care Bear Book of Poems	Bobbi Katz	September 12, 1984	Bobbi Barto	0-394-86719-X
The Care Bears' Circus of Shapes	Peggy Kahn	October 12, 1984	Carolyn Bracken	0-394-86726-2
The Care Bears Help Santa	Peggy Kahn	November 12, 1984	Denise Fleming	0-394-86807-2
The Care Bears and the Snack Attack	Nicole Lorian	1985	Pat Sustendal	0-394-86955-9
Play with the Care Bears	Bobbi Katz	March 12, 1985	Bobbi Barto	0-394-87098-0
Baby Care Bears' Animal Friends	Peggy Kahn	April 12, 1985	Carolyn Bracken	0-394-87044-1
The Care Bears' Party Cookbook	Jane O'Connor	April 12, 1985	Pat Sustendal	0-394-87305-X
The Care Bears: "Try, Try Again!"	Peggy Kahn	September 12, 1985	Michael Fahrion	0-394-87503-6
Christmas with the Care Bears (Note: Listed on WorldCat as The Care Bear Cousins and the Snowy Christmas.)	Della Maison	September 12, 1985	Cathy Beylon	0-394-87216-9
The Care Bears' Night Before Christmas (Note: Adapted from the original text of "A Visit from St. Nicholas" by Clement Clarke Moore.)	Peggy Kahn	October 12, 1985	Diane Kamm	0-394-87502-8
Care Bear Cousins: Count to 10	Emma Bruns	March 12, 1986	Cynthia Wasco	0-394-87628-8
Care Bear Cousins: Favorite Things	Emma Bruns	March 12, 1986	Janet Marseglia Jones	0-394-87625-3
A Visit to the Care Bears	Emma Bruns	March 12, 1986	Cynthia Wasco	0-394-87627-X
The Care Bear Cousins' Mystery Adventure	Sonia Black Woods	April 12, 1986	Bobbi Barto	0-394-87933-3
The Care Bears: "It's My Cat!"	Helane Keating	April 12, 1986	Bobbi Barto	0-394-87934-1
The Care Bears and the Big Cleanup	Bobbi Katz	October 29, 1991	Richard Max Kolding	0-679-82367-0
The Care Bears and the Whale Tale	Peggy Kahn	February 18, 1992	Ronald Fritz	0-679-82764-1

=== Scholastic Books ===
A few months after the 2002 relaunch of the Care Bears franchise, Scholastic Books published its first titles featuring the characters.

Title	Author	Release date	Illustrator	ISBN
Caring Contest	Nancy Parent	February 1, 2003	David Stein	0-439-45158-2
Caring Rainbow: A Book About Colors!	Sonia Sander; L.C. Falken	February 1, 2003	Jay Johnson	0-439-45178-7
Find That Rainbow! (Sticker Storybook)	Sonia Sander	February 1, 2003	Duendes del Sur	0-439-45176-0
What Makes You Happy?	J.E. Bright	February 1, 2003	N/A	0-439-45543-X
Busy, Busy, Summer Day	Sonia Sander	August 1, 2003	David Stein	0-439-53196-9
Lucky Day	Frances Ann Ladd	August 1, 2003	Jay Johnson	0-439-45172-8
Who's Who? (Sticker Storybook)	Sonia Sander	August 1, 2003	Duendes del Sur	0-439-45176-0
Catch the Christmas Spirit!	Katie Tait	October 1, 2003	The Artful Doodelers	0-439-46023-9
The Day Nobody Shared	Nancy Parent	October 1, 2003	Jay Johnson	0-439-45157-4
Special Delivery	Quinlan B. Lee	January 1, 2004	Jay Johnson	0-439-60318-8
Funshine in the Sunshine	Sonia Sander	February 1, 2004	Jay Johnson	0-439-45545-6
How Does Your Garden Grow?	Francis Ann Ladd	February 1, 2004	Jay Johnson	0-439-54962-0
Storybook Treasury	Silje Swendsen (editor)	February 1, 2004	Duendes del Sur; Jay Johnson; David Stein	0-439-62486-X
Care Bears: All for You!	Frances Ann Ladd	August 1, 2004	Jay Johnson	0-439-62493-2
Care Bears Official Handbook	Frances Ann Ladd	August 1, 2004	Jay Johnson	0-439-66402-0
Nighty Night	Quinlan B. Lee	August 1, 2004	Jay Johnson	0-439-62495-9
Trick or Treat	Quinlan B. Lee	August 1, 2004	Jay Johnson	0-439-66398-9
Journey to Joke-a-lot	Frances Ann Ladd	September 1, 2004	Jay Johnson	0-439-65102-6
King Funshine Bear	Frances Ann Ladd	September 1, 2004	Jay Johnson	0-439-62490-8
Winter Wonderland	Justin Spelvin	2005	Jay Johnson	0-439-66959-6
Easter Egg Hunt	Quinlan B. Lee	February 1, 2005	Jay Johnson	0-439-69161-3
Most Valuable Bear	Justin Spelvin	February 1, 2005	Jay Johnson	0-439-66958-8
Sweet Dreams!	Quinlan B. Lee	February 1, 2005	Jay Johnson	0-439-69162-1
Wish Upon a Star	Quinlan B. Lee	February 1, 2005	Jay Johnson	0-439-69597-X
The Care Bears' Big Wish	Sonia Sander	October 1, 2005	Jay Johnson	0-439-74416-4
Wish Bear's Promise	Sonia Sander	October 1, 2005	Jay Johnson	0-439-74414-8
Giving Thanks	Quinlan B. Lee	October 1, 2005	Jay Johnson	0-439-74415-6
Love Is All Around	Sonia Sander	January 1, 2006	Saxton Moore	0-439-78930-3
My Best Friends	Justin Spelvin	June 2006	Jeff Albrecht	0-439-75525-5
What I Love Best	Jenny McPherson	January 1, 2007	Nick Roberts	978-0-439-89459-3
Good Luck Bear's Special Day	Sonia Sander	March 1, 2007	Jay Johnson	978-0-439-88858-5
Caring and Sharing	Samantha Brooke	April 1, 2007	Jeff Harter	978-0-439-89468-5
Care Bears: Oopsy Does It!	Samantha Brooke	July 1, 2007	Kelly Grupczynski; Josie Yee	978-0-439-02676-5
Oopsy Saves the Day!	Sonia Sander	July 1, 2007	Jeff Harter; Jay Johnson	978-0-439-02675-8
Christmas Cheer	Sonia Sander	October 1, 2007	Rosario Pepe	978-0-439-89511-8
Snow Fun	Scholastic staff	December 1, 2007	Michael Massen	978-0-545-01310-9
Caring Colors	Scholastic staff	February 1, 2008	Jeff Harter; Josie Yee	978-0-545-00653-8
Plant a Garden	Sonia Sander	March 6, 2008	Saxton Moore; Warner McGee	978-0-545-00908-9
How Do You Feel?	Samantha Brooke	August 1, 2008	Jeff Harter; Jay Johnson	978-0-545-01309-3
A Very Grumpy Thanksgiving	Scholastic staff	October 2008	N/A	978-0-545-07610-4
Christmas Surprise	Jenny McPherson	October 1, 2008	Jeff Harter; Warner McGee	978-0-545-00907-2

== Spanish-language books ==
In 1984, Parker Brothers' Tales from the Care Bears made their appearance in Spain as the Un Cuento de Los Osos Amorosos series. The titles in this version were published by that country's division of General Mills, and translated from the original English by Leopoldo Rodríguez Regueira.

Title	Original English author	Original title	ISBN
Una Amiga para Laura	Geoffrey Wills	A Friend for Frances	84-7619-007-7
Una Bruja en la Calle	Stephanie Morgan	The Witch Down the Street	84-7619-009-3
El Cariño Es Lo Que Cuenta	Ward Johnson	Caring Is What Counts	84-7619-011-5
Dulces Sueños para Mónica	Amelia Hubert	Sweet Dreams for Sally	84-7619-006-9
Una Hermanita para Oscar	Evelyn Mason	A Sister for Sam	84-7619-010-7
El Problema de Iván	Margaret Ludlow	The Trouble with Timothy	84-7619-008-5

In 1987, Montena D.L. published two books featuring the Care Bears: Juego con los Osos Amorosos (ISBN 84-397-1099-2) and Dónde, cómo, qué. That same year, Madrid's Mondadori published Feliz cumpleaños, Osos Amorosos.

== French-language books ==
=== Tales from the Care Bears ===
France's division of General Mills published Danièle Laufer's translations of the Tales in 1984.

Title	Original English author	Original title	ISBN
Une amie pour Françoise	Geoffrey Wills	A Friend for Frances	1-85071-120-8
Ce sont les émotions et les sentiments qui comptent	Ward Johnson	Caring Is What Counts	1-85071-125-9
Fais de beaux rêves, Aurélie	Amelia Hubert	Sweet Dreams for Sally	1-85071-105-4
Les mésaventures de Mathieu	Margaret Ludlow	The Trouble with Timothy	1-85071-100-3
Une petite soeur pour Grégoire	Evelyn Mason	A Sister for Sam	1-85071-115-1
La sorcière du bout de la rue	Stephanie Morgan	The Witch Down the Street	1-85071-110-0

=== Other books ===
Title	Author	Publisher	Release date	Original title	ISBN
L'Alphabet des Bisounours	Peggy Kahn; Tr. Flore Aline	Hachette Jeunesse	1984	The Care Bears' Book of ABC's	2-01-010351-3
Les Bisounours et le nouveau bébé	Peggy Kahn; Tr. Flore Aline	Hachette Jeunesse	1984	The Care Bears and the New Baby	2-01-010347-5
Connais-tu les Bisounours?	Ali Reich	Hachette Jeunesse	1984	Meet the Care Bears	2-01-010346-7
Le Jardin des Bisounours	Della Maison	Hachette Jeunesse	1984	The Care Bears' Garden	2-01-010348-3

== German-language books ==
The Tales from the Care Bears were also published in German in 1984.

Title	Original English author	Original title	ISBN
Auf Freunde ist Verlass	Ward Johnson	Caring Is What Counts	84-499-7645-6
Du machst uns Kummer, Tim	Margaret Ludlow	The Trouble with Timothy	84-499-7644-8
Eine Freundin für Stefanie	Geoffrey Wills	A Friend for Frances	84-499-7642-1
Die Hexe im Hans an der Ecke	Stephanie Morgan	The Witch Down the Street	84-499-7641-3
Ein Schwesterchen für Christian	Evelyn Mason	A Sister for Sam	84-499-7643-X
Träume süss, Melaine	Amelia Hubert	Sweet Dreams for Sally	84-499-7640-5

== Dutch-language books ==
Title	Author	Publisher	Release date	Original title	ISBN
De tuin van de Troetelbeertjes	Della Maison; Tr. Els van Delden	Bruna	1986	The Care Bears' Garden	90-229-4226-0

== Portuguese-language books ==
These titles were published by Brazil's Fundamento, under the local franchise name Ursinhos Carinhosos.

Title	Original English author	Release date	Original title	ISBN
Aventuras na nuvem rosa	Silje Swendsen	N/A	Storybook Treasury	85-7676-456-3
Concurso de carinho	Nancy Parent	N/A	Caring Contest	85-7676-434-2
Dia de sorte	Frances Ann Ladd	N/A	Lucky Day	85-7676-435-0
Encontre aquelle arco-iris	Sonia Sander	N/A	Find That Rainbow!	85-7676-432-6

== Danish-language books ==
These were published in 2004 by Denmark's K.E. Media, and translated by Søren Lampe.

Title	Original English author	Original title	ISBN
Find en regnbue! (Klistermærkebog)	Sonia Sander	Find That Rainbow!	87-637-0033-6
En heldig dag	Frances Ann Ladd	Lucky Day	87-637-0036-0
Hvad gør dig glad?	J.E. Bright	What Makes You Happy?	87-637-0042-5
En kærlig konkurrence	Nancy Parent	Caring Contest	87-637-0039-5
Regnbue-festen: En bog om farver!	Sonia Sander; L.C. Falken	Caring Rainbow: A Book About Colors!	87-637-0030-1

== Hebrew-language books ==
Around 1987, Israel's Modan published Hebrew versions of selected Tales from the Care Bears, marketed for this country as Sipur mi-sipure Dube'khpat li. ʻIvri Shafrirah Zakai and Tom Ḳuḳ served as the translators.

Title	Original English author	Original title
Ha-khi ṭov li-heyot amits	Elizabeth Winthrop	Being Brave Is Best
Ḥaverah li-Reṿiṭal	Geoffrey Wills	A Friend for Frances
Milḥamtam shel Dube'khpat li bi-mekhonat ha-haḳpaʼah	Arthur S. Rosenblatt	The Care Bears Battle the Freeze Machine
Milot ha-ḳesem	Maria B. Murad	The Magic Words

Shafrirah Zakai wrote another four books featuring the characters, also from Modan: Dube'khpat li ṿe-taḥarut ha-kishronot, Dubeʼkhpat li ṿeha-beʻayah ha-ḳeṭanah, Dubeʼkhpat li ṿe-tahalukhat ha-ḳarnaval and Dubeʼkhpat li ṿeha-mirdaf aḥare ha-otsar.

== Polish-language books ==
Urodziny urwisa, an Ewa Ziółkowska translation of an earlier French work by Imelda Heuschen, was published in 1994 by Warsaw's RTV (ISBN 83-85493-53-0).
