= Care Bears Nutcracker Suite =

1988 film

- Original 1988 VHS cover
- Genre: Animated special Christmas
- Written by: John de Klein
- Directed by: Joseph Sherman; Laura Shepherd
- Theme music composer: Tom Szczesniak; Ray Parker; Jim Morgan; Acrobat Music; Patricia Cullen
- Composer: Peter Ilyich Tchaikovsky
- Country of origin: Canada
- Original language: English

Production
- Producers: Michael Hirsh; Patrick Loubert; Clive A. Smith
- Running time: 62 minutes
- Production company: Nelvana Limited

Original release
- Network: The Disney Channel
- Release: December 10, 1988
- Network: Global Television Network
- Release: December 25, 1988

Care Bears Nutcracker Suite is an animated television film featuring the Care Bears characters. Produced by the Canadian animation studio Nelvana in 1988, it is loosely based on the 1892 Nutcracker ballet by Pyotr Ilyich Tchaikovsky (adapted in turn from E. T. A. Hoffmann's 1816 short story "The Nutcracker and the Mouse King"). The film was directed by Joseph Sherman and Laura Shepherd, and produced by Nelvana's founders: Michael Hirsh, Patrick Loubert and Clive A. Smith. It serves as the series finale for The Care Bears Family animated series.

In this special, a schoolteacher tells some children a version of the Nutcracker story which features the Care Bear Family. While helping a sad girl named Anna, the Care Bears and Care Bear Cousins meet a wooden soldier and a group of malicious rats from a place called Toyland. Entering this place, Anna and the Family learn that an evil Vizier is planning to destroy it with the help of his rodent army, and has his sights on a powerful ring that has been long hidden from the denizens.

Care Bears Nutcracker Suite premiered on video and television in December 1988 across North America, and was met with indifferent reception. The special premiered on DVD in France in 2004, and then in November 2006 by Lions Gate Home Entertainment under a new English title, Care Bears: The Nutcracker. This was Nelvana's last Care Bears production until Journey to Joke-a-lot in 2004.

== Plot ==
At the school called P.S. 5, a teacher named Miss Walker tells some children a version of E. T. A. Hoffmann's The Nutcracker and the Mouse King, involving the Care Bear Family. As the story begins, the Care Bears and their Cousins prepare for Christmas in their home of Care-a-lot; the two youngest bears, Hugs and Tugs, are searching for an ornament. While the others spend time in the Hall of Hearts decorating a tree, Funshine alerts them of an unhappy girl named Anna. Enlisting Grumpy Bear to go along, she takes a Cloud Mobile down to Earth.

When the two bears visit Anna, they learn that her best friend Sharon has moved away, and her younger brother Peter is more interested in adventures. As they talk about the virtues of friendship, a burst of light startles them. Eventually, a tall wooden Nutcracker doll emerges from a black portal, along with a band of rats (led by the Rat King) who are after him. When the group hides from their foes, the Nutcracker recollects some of his lost memory and explains that he arrived from a place called Toyland; the rats work for the evil Vizier who is plotting to conquer and destroy that land along with Christmas.

Funshine and Grumpy send out a signal to Care-a-lot; Lotsa Heart Elephant, Brave Heart Lion and Tenderheart Bear (along with stowaway Hugs and Tugs) later join them. Together, they send the rats back to Toyland. Before everyone follows, Hugs and Tugs are asked to stay behind with Peter, but they venture into Toyland, nevertheless, hoping to find an ornament and some adventure.

At his castle, the Vizier wants to know the whereabouts of a powerful ring worn by Toyland's former Prince, so that he can control the land. His captive, the Sugar Plum Fairy, refuses to tell him; he is more outraged when the Rat King arrives without the Nutcracker. The Vizier soon takes notice when the Nutcracker and his friends enter Toyland, and take a train through its various sights.

When they stop for the night, the friends contend with a group of toys led by the Harlequin, who also want the train, but advise them to leave Toyland. One of them later explains how they tried to save their land, after the Vizier and the rats overthrew its Prince and captured his castle. To make sure the Vizier never got it, the Sugar Plum Fairy hid the Prince's ring away. The Nutcracker is determined to end the Vizier's reign, despite the rats' barricade. En route, the train is attacked by the rats, who capture Peter, Hugs and Tugs.

Upon reaching the castle by raft, the group secretly sneaks inside and frees the Sugar Plum Fairy. With her help, the Bears, the Cousins & the Harlequin discover a walnut ornament containing the ring, but the Vizier seizes it. However, the walnut can only be opened by the Nutcracker, who refuses. Furious, the Vizier turns the Bears, the Cousins and the Harlequin into firewood, one at a time. With only Anna left, the Nutcracker reluctantly agrees to open the walnut. Peter, Hugs and Tugs, having escaped from imprisonment, manage to take the walnut, resulting in the rats chasing them. Unfortunately, they are soon recaptured, but free the Sugar Plum Fairy just as the Nutcracker opens the walnut. Before the Vizier can claim it, the Fairy grabs the ring and places it on the Nutcracker's finger, turning him back into the Prince of Toyland and reviving his memory. Restoring the Bears and Cousins to normal, they use their Stare to defeat the rats. With the Vizier also defeated by the Prince, Toyland is returned to its former glory (which means hiding it was useless). The Prince bids farewell to Anna, Peter, the Bears and Cousins, promising to always remember them as friends. He also gives the walnut to Hugs and Tugs for their special ornament. As everyone departs, Anna awakens from her bed, back in the real world. Lamenting that it was all just a dream, she is greeted by a new neighbor, Alan Prince, who looks exactly like the Prince in Anna's dream.

When Miss Walker finishes her tale, one of the children wants to ask what happened to Anna. Suddenly a grownup Alan appears at the door. As he and the teacher, now revealed to be Anna, leave the stage together, the other children start rehearsing Pyotr Ilyich Tchaikovsky's ballet. Unknown to all of them, the Care Bear Family has been listening all along (secretly supervising them all [naturally], meaning that Anna wasn't dreaming about Toyland after all).

== Cast ==
Actor	Character	Source
Tracey Moore	Baby Hugs	
Melleny Brown	Baby Tugs	
Dan Hennessey	Brave Heart Lion	
John Stocker	The Rat King	
Bob Dermer	Grumpy Bear, Gummy	
Susan Roman	Funshine Bear	
Luba Goy	Lotsa Heart Elephant	
Keith Hampshire	Rumble	
Michael Beattie	Alan Prince (Nutcracker form)	
Mairon Bennett	Holly	
Tara Charendoff	Anna	
Stuart Stone	Peter	
Don Francks	Evil Vizier	
Abby Hagyard	Miss Walker	
Jim Henshaw	Tenderheart Bear	
Keith Knight	Harlequin	
Adam Simpson	Chris	
Sunny Besen Thrasher (Note: Credited as Sunny Thrasher.)	Alan Prince (Human form)	

== Production ==
Care Bears Nutcracker Suite is loosely based on The Nutcracker and the Mouse King by E. T. A. Hoffmann, as well as the Nutcracker ballet by Pyotr Ilyich Tchaikovsky. Animation was produced by Canada's Nelvana; South Korea's Hanho Heung-Up; Taiwan's Wang Film Productions; and China's Shanghai Animation Film Studio. The special was presented by Neil B. Saul of The Saul Group, and produced by Nelvana in association with Canada's Global Television Network. American Greetings staff members Jack Chojnacki (of Those Characters from Cleveland) and Harvey Levin (a vice-president) were credited as creative consultants. This is the only Nelvana production of a Care Bears special; the first two, The Land Without Feelings and The Freeze Machine, were produced by Atkinson Film-Arts in the early half of the 1980s. After Nutcracker Suite, Nelvana would not venture into another Care Bears project until 2004's Journey to Joke-a-lot.

== Release ==
Care Bears Nutcracker Suite was originally planned for a theatrical release, but premiered on home video and television instead. The special debuted on the U.S. premium cable network The Disney Channel on December 10, 1988. In Canada, it aired commercial-free on the Global network on December 25, as part of the regular Care Bears series. The special was shown likewise on Malaysia's TV3 in December 1989.

The North American VHS and Beta editions were released in December 1988 by Kids Klassics, a division of GoodTimes Entertainment. This was one of the label's three Christmas titles for that year; the others were Christmas Comes to Pac-Land and A Flintstone Christmas. The film was released on Region 2 DVD in France (on June 2, 2004), with Warner Vision's edition of Les Calinours au pays de casse-noisette. On November 7, 2006, Lions Gate Home Entertainment released the special on DVD for the first time in North America, under the title Care Bears: The Nutcracker.

On its original airing, Associated Press writer Kathryn Baker deemed the Nutcracker special "Strictly for those who prefer jelly beans to Christmas dinner." In 1991, Chris Hicks of Utah's Deseret News gave it 1½ stars out of four, commenting that "Even my young children find this one too saccharine". The special is mentioned in Craig Nelson's Bad TV: The Very Best of the Very Worst, in a section entitled "The Curse of the Top Five Annual Christmas Specials" (along with those based on The Smurfs and The Poky Little Puppy).

== See also ==
- The Nutcracker Prince, a 1990 theatrically released Canadian animated feature based on the same source material
- Canadian films of the 1980s
- List of productions of The Nutcracker
