= List of Care Bears albums =

This is a list of albums based on the Care Bears franchise.

== 1980s ==
(all from Kid Stuff Records)

- Introducing the Care Bears (1982)
- The Care Bears Care For You (1983)
- Adventures in Care-a-lot (1983)
- The Care Bears Off To See The World (1983)
- The Care Bears' Christmas (1983)
- The Care Bears Birthday Party (1984)
- The Care Bears Movie: Original Soundtrack Album (1985)
- Care Bears Movie II: Original Soundtrack Recording (1986)
- Friends Make Everything Better (1986)

(from The Palitoy Company)

- Care Bears: To the Rescue (1984) (UK-Exclusive)

== 2000s ==
From Madacy Kids:

- Meet the Care Bears (2004)
- Journey to Joke-a-lot Soundtrack (2004)
- Care Bears Holiday Hugs (2004)
- Care Bears Karaoke: Sing Like a Star (2004) - Two CD set. Consists of Care Bears' Karaoke: Sing Like A Star!, and Care Bears' Sing-Along Favorites. The karaoke CD is a CD-G enhanced Audio CD and will only display lyrics on CD-G enabled players.
- Care Bears Nighty-Night (2005)
- Care Bears Christmas Eve (2006)
- Care Bears: Let's Be Friends (2006) - released only as a digital download on various digital music stores, as well as on Wal-Mart's custom CD service. Consequently, it is very difficult to acquire the album legally when outside the US as many online stores refuse to sell to international customers.
- Care Bears: Share A Smile (2006) - Combined into Care Bears: Let's Be Friends.

From Kids' Jukebox:

- Care Bears: Music for Me (2006) - Customizable album, requires name to be sent in to publisher.
- Care Bears: My Music (2008) - Re-released version of Care Bears: Music for Me, no longer requires a special online purchase but requires special software be installed on the PC and a valid internet connection to be present/

== 2020s ==
From Arts Music:

- Care Bears' Kids' Hits – Vol. 1 (2021)
- Care Bears: Unlock the Music (2021)
