= Linda Ballantyne =

Canadian voice actress (born 1964)

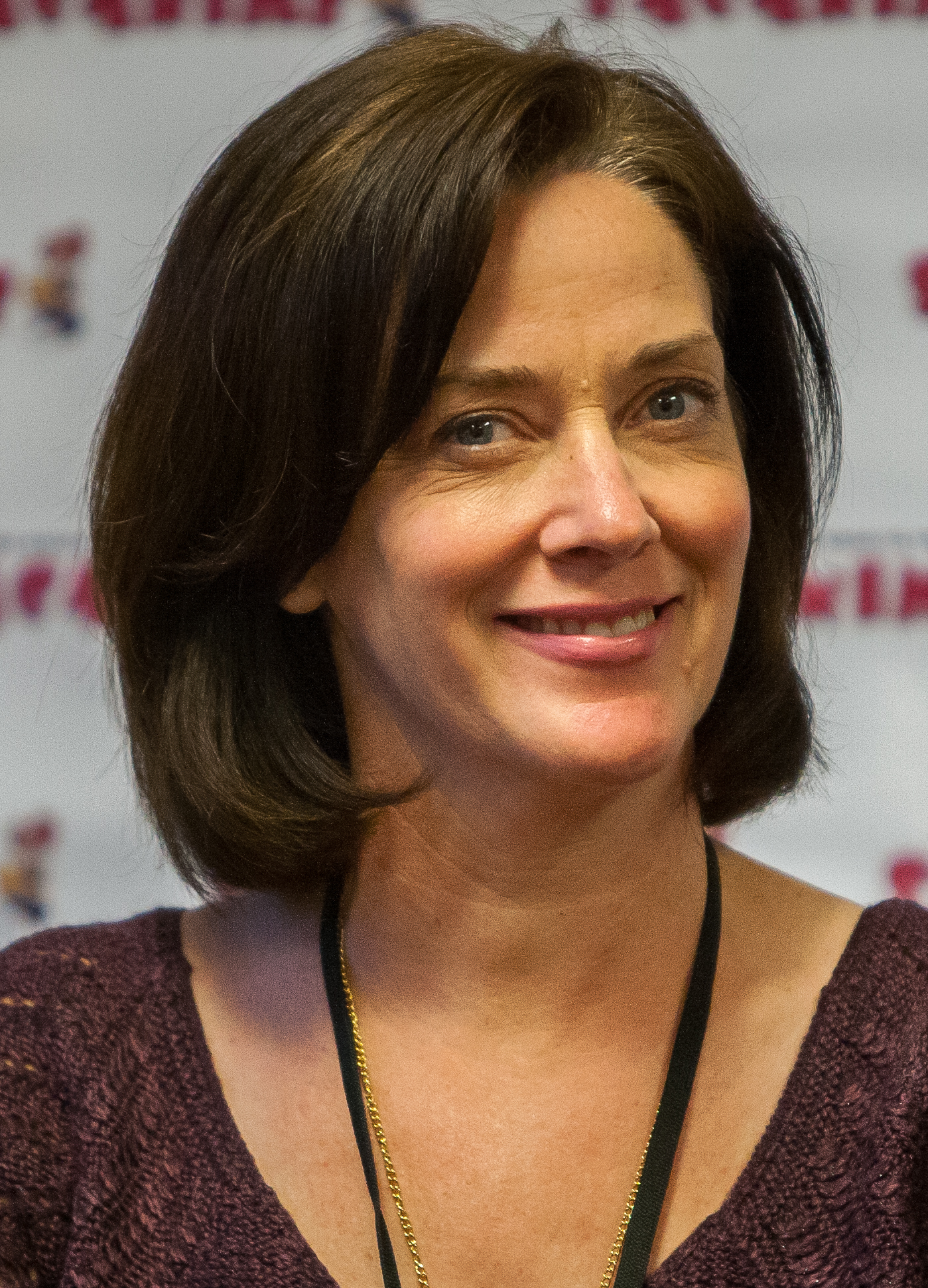
- Ballantyne in 2015
- Born: Linda Anne Hodgins; October 24, 1964 (age 62)
- Occupation: Voice actress
- Years active: 1999–present
- Agent: AMI - Artist Management Inc.
- Spouse: Fred Ballantyne

Linda Anne Ballantyne (née Hodgins) (born October 24, 1964) is a Canadian voice actress, who is best known for voicing the title role of Serena Tsukino/Sailor Moon in the second half of the original English version of Sailor Moon, Wicked in Cyberchase and Champ Bear in Care Bears: Journey to Joke-a-lot and The Care Bears' Big Wish Movie.

== Early life ==
Ballantyne was born to Gloria (née Sawyer) and Kitchener Hodgins.

== Career ==
Ballantyne began her voice acting career in 1999 for the animated series, The Avengers: United They Stand as the voice of Wasp/Janet Van Dyne.

In 2000, she voiced Percy in the 2000 fantasy film, Thomas and the Magic Railroad, replacing Michael Angelis in the final cut.

Ballantyne would later provide the voice of Champ Bear in the Care Bears films, Care Bears: Journey to Joke-a-lot and The Care Bears' Big Wish Movie, as well as the voice of Wicked in the PBS Kids long running children's television series, Cyberchase.

She also had recurring voice roles in Yin Yang Yo! and briefly voiced Violet Vanderfleet in the animated series, Totally Spies!. From 2021 to 2023, she voiced Lady Lydia and Officer Pooch in Go, Dog. Go!

== Filmography ==
=== Film ===
| Year | Title | Role | Notes |
|---|---|---|---|
| 2000 | Thomas and the Magic Railroad | Percy the Small Engine | Voice |
| 2004 | Care Bears: Journey to Joke-a-lot | Champ Bear | Voice; Direct-to-video |
| 2005 | Care Bears: Big Wish Movie | Champ Bear | Voice; Direct-to-video |

=== Anime ===
| Year | Title | Role | Notes |
|---|---|---|---|
| 2000 | Sailor Moon | Sailor Moon (Serena Tsukino)/Princess Serenity | Main role; 77 episodes |

=== Animation ===
| Year | Title | Role | Notes |
|---|---|---|---|
| 1999 | Tales from the Cryptkeeper | Jamie's Mom | Episode: "Imaginary Friend" |
| 1999–2000 | The Avengers: United They Stand | Wasp (Janet Van Dyne) | Main role; 13 episodes |
| 2002–09; 2013; 2018 | Cyberchase | Wicked | Recurring role; 21 episodes |
| 2002 | Moville Mysteries | Veronica's mother | Episode: "Curse of the Mommies" |
| 2003 | Air Master | Kaori Sakiyama | Main role; 22 episodes |
| 2003; 2015 | Totally Spies! | Violet Vanderfleet | Episodes: "Bouquets are So Passe", "Baddies on a Blimp" |
| 2005 | Mischief City | Mrs. Dawn Adams | |
| 2005 | Gerald McBoing Boing | Gerald's mother | Episode: "Pilot" |
| 2006 | Bigfoot Presents: Meteor and the Mighty Monster Trucks | Sinker, Hook's Mom | Episode: "Race Relations" |
| 2006–08 | Yin Yang Yo! | Floating Head Spirit #3/Mrs. Roger/Tillman/Saranoia/Miss Melly Millipede/Female Monster/Girl Lobster in Audience/Smoke/Ella Mental | 7 episodes |
| 2007–08 | Will & Dewitt | Shelley | Recurring role; 12 episodes |
| 2007-2010 | Magi-Nation | Guardian Hyren of D'Resh | |
| 2008 | Teddy Bear | Newscaster | TV movie |
| 2008 | Super Why! | Farmer's Wife | Episode: "The Foolish Wishes" |
| 2008 | Toot & Puddle | Tulip | Main role; 13 episodes |
| 2010 | The Mysteries of Alfred Hedgehog | Mrs. Payne | |
| 2010 | Bakugan Battle Brawlers: Gundalian Invaders | Child 1/Girl A/Hypno-Girl D/Hypno-Girl E/Kazarina/Ventus Girl #2/Zombie Girl #1/Zombie Girl #2 | Episode: "Forgiveness" |
| 2010 | Doodlebops Rockin' Road Show | Super Fly/Woman/Cat #1 | Episodes: "Super Doodles/One Up", "Harris Gets Embarrassed/Memory Lane" |
| 2011 | The Cat in the Hat Knows a Lot About That! | Polly/Mort/Katie/Llama | 3 episodes |
| 2011-2012 | My Big Big Friend | Lili's Mom | |
| 2011–12 | Mia and Me | Queen Mayla | Main role; 33 episodes |
| 2012 | BeyWheelz | Lucy/Leader B | Episode: "Race: The BeyWheelz Grand Prix" |
| 2014 | Lucky Duck | Reporter | TV short |
| 2015 | Arthur | Rattles' mom | Episode: "Whip. Mix. Blend/Staycation" |
| 2016 | Fangbone! | Wargrunt | 26 episodes |
| 2016–17 | George of the Jungle | Magnolia | 52 episodes |
| 2017 | The ZhuZhus | Star | Episode: "Zhu Land" |
| 2018 | Inspector Gadget | Ms. Harriet Bouffantington | Episode: "The Heir Affhair/Parched Nemesis" |
| 2019 | Let's Go Luna! | Pippa Chockers | Episode: "Didgeridoo and Carmen Too/Not Home on the Range" |
| 2019 | Max & Ruby | Candi | Episode: "One of a Kind Ruby/Ruby's To Do List" |
| 2021–23 | Go, Dog. Go! | Lady Lydia/Officer Pooch | Recurring role; 9 episodes |
| 2026-present | Phoebe & Jay | Miss Jean | Recurring role |

| Preceded by Terri Hawkes | Voice of Sailor Moon; Eps. 83 - 159 | Succeeded by Stephanie Sheh |
