= Terri Hawkes =

Canadian actress (born 1958/59)

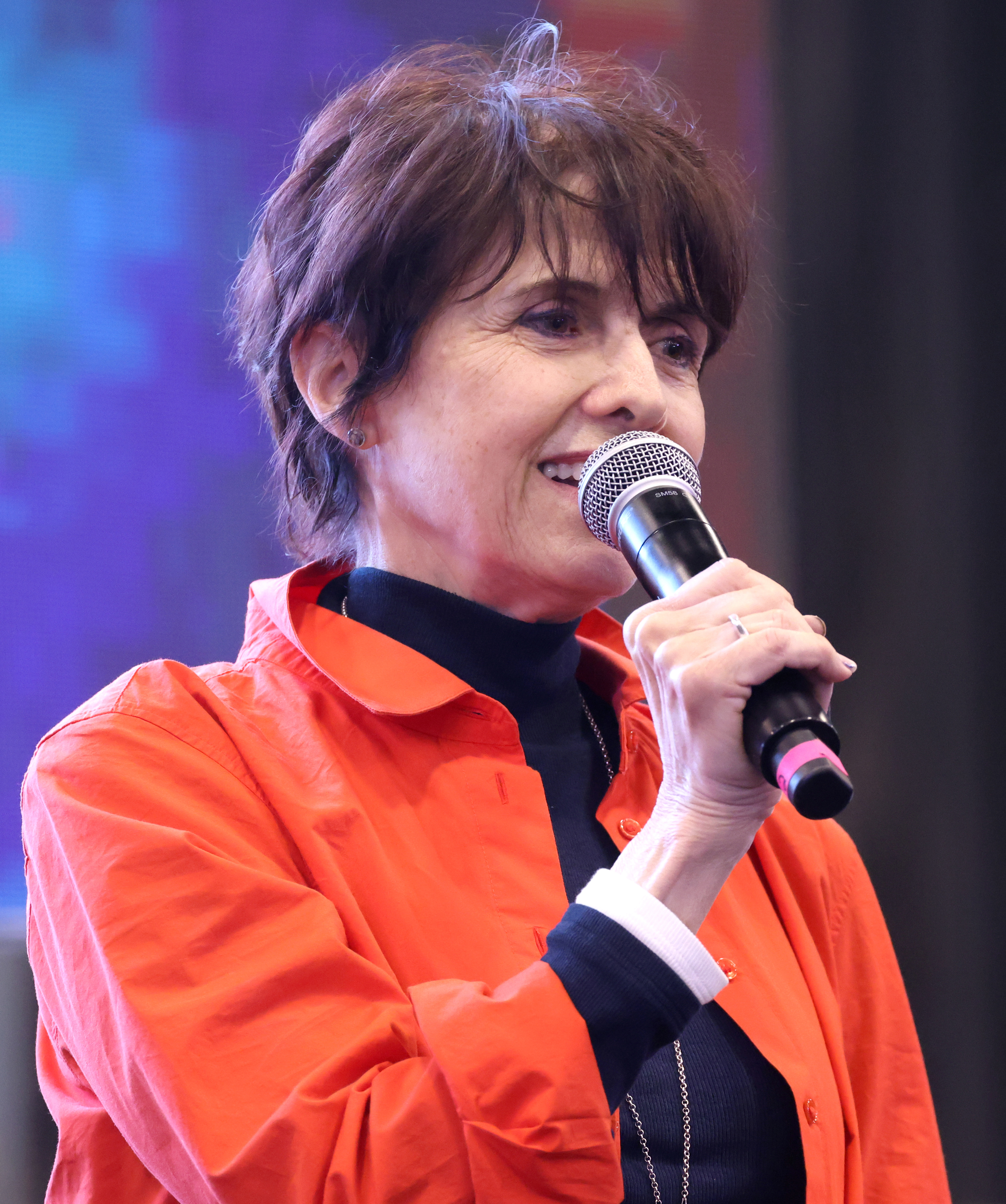
- Hawkes in 2026
- Born: 1958 or 1959 (age 67–68); Montreal, Quebec, Canada
- Education: University of Calgary; University of California, Los Angeles; York University
- Occupations: Actress; writer
- Years active: 1983–present
- Spouse: Jeff Sackman (m. 2000; div. 2017)
- Children: 2
- Father: Jim Hawkes
- Website: www.terri-hawkes.com

Terri Hawkes (born 1958 or 1959) is a Canadian actress and writer, known for playing Kelly Hennenlotter in the horror film, Hello Mary Lou: Prom Night II, Adrienne in Beverly Hills 90210, Wendy Masters in General Hospital, and for being the second English dub voice actress of the title character of the Japanese anime Sailor Moon. She is the daughter of politician Jim Hawkes.

Hawkes' other voice acting roles include Baby Hugs Bear in The Care Bears Movie, and reprised the role in Nelvana's Care Bears TV show, where she also voiced Shreeky (No Heart's niece). Hawkes also had a role playing Monika Barnes in the early episodes of Traders, and also was the voice of a 3D sphere in Max Maven's The MAXimum Dimension. Hawkes also worked as a voice director for the children's animated series Flying Rhino Junior High, and the English version of the 1996 Canadian Horror film Karmina and was an assistant voice director for Sailor Moon.

She also wrote the screenplay of the 2002 film The Book of Eve and one episode of the Canadian children's animated series Anne of Green Gables: The Animated Series which was broadcast on TVO in Canada and PBS in America. Since 2007, Hawkes has concentrated on writing and directing, with a focus on works that empower women. She finished an M.A in Gender, Feminist and Women's Studies, and is currently working on a doctorate in Gender Feminist and Women's Studies at York University.

She currently lives with her two children in Toronto, Ontario. She was a candidate in Ward 11 University—Rosedale in the 2026 Toronto municipal election.

In May 2017, Hawkes divorced from her husband, retired producer Jeff Sackman. Sackman was the founder of the defunct film company thinkfilm.

== Filmography ==
=== Films ===
Year	Title	Role	Notes
1986	Killer Party	Melanie	
1987	Hello Mary Lou: Prom Night II	Kelly Hennenlotter	
1987	Crazy Moon	Pamela	
1989	White Hot	Christine	
1989	Foreign Nights	Leila	
1993	Watch It	Denise	
1993	Slaughter of the Innocents	Ellen Jenkins	
1994	The Killing Machine	Dr. Ann Kendall	
1995	Night of the Running Man	Nicole, Amtrak Ticket Agent #2	
1996	Sabotage	Jess	
1998	Papertrail	Rachel Quinn/Alone	
1998	Bone Daddy	Anchorwoman	
1998	Dog Park	Announcer	
1999	Prisoner of Love	Lana	
2002	The Book of Eve	not applicable	wrote the screenplay
2004	Cube Zero	Jellico	direct to video movie

=== Films (animated & anime) ===
Year	Title	Role	Notes
1985	The Care Bears Movie	Baby Hugs	
2000	Sailor Moon R the Movie: The Promise of the Rose	Sailor Moon / Serena	Pioneer / Optimum Productions Dub
2000	Sailor Moon S the Movie: Hearts in Ice	Sailor Moon / Serena	Pioneer / Optimum Productions Dub
2000	Sailor Moon Super S the Movie: Black Dream Hole	Sailor Moon / Serena	Pioneer / Optimum Productions Dub
2007	Care Bears: Oopsy Does It!	Love-a-Lot Bear	

=== Television ===
Year	Title	Role	Notes
1984	Today's Special	The Nurse	(1 episode); "Hospitals"
1984	Hangin' In	Claudia/Jenny	(2 episodes); "Okay, Blue Jays", "Great Expectations"
1986	Air Waves	Marie	(1 episode); "Angelfish"
1986	Night Heat	Gillian Cavanaugh	(1 episode); "Children of the Night"
1989–1992	Katts and Dog		(2 episodes); "Crime of Fashion", "12 Cops & a Baby"
1990	E.N.G.	Lorelei	(1 episode); "Catch a Falling Star"
1990	General Hospital	Wendy Masters	
1993	Forever Knight	Bernice Applebaum	(1 episode); "If Looks Could Kill"
1994	Lonesome Dove: The Series	Ruby	(1 episode); "High Lonesome"
1995	Road to Avonlea	Charlotte Ames	(1 episode); "The Return of Gus Pike"
1995	Beverly Hills, 90210	Adrienne	(1 episode); "You Gotta Have a Heart"
1995	Sirens	Kim Stoner	
1995	The Shamrock Conspiracy	Maria	TV movie
1996	Traders	Monika Barnes	Recurring role; 7 episodes
1997–1998	PSI Factor: Chronicles of the Paranormal	Kate Azzopardi	(3 episodes); "Palimpsest", "Map to the Stars", "Man of War"
1998	Vig	Magic Lounge Waitress	TV movie
1998	Murder She Purred: A Mrs. Murphy Mystery	Little Marilyn	TV movie
1999	Murder in a Small Town	Esther	TV movie
1999	The Outer Limits	Dr. Cleo Lazar	(1 episode); "Déjà Vu"
1999	Earth: Final Conflict	Detective Sherman	(1 episode); "Déjà Vu"

=== Television (animated & anime) ===
Year	Title	Role	Notes
1983	The Special Magic of Herself the Elf	Snow Drop	TV movie
1985	The World Turned Upside Down	Hannah	
1986–1988	The Care Bears Family	Shreeky / Baby Hugs	Recurring role; 46 episodes
1987	Beverly Hills Teens	Bianca Dupree / Blaze Summers / Jillian Thorndyke	some episodes
1993	Tales from the Cryptkeeper	Katie	(1 episode); "Grounds for Horror"
1995–1998	Sailor Moon	Sailor Moon / Serena Tsukino	Main role; 57 episodes
1996	Blazing Dragons	Additional Voices	
1997	Princess Sissi	Princess Sissi	Main role
1998	Flying Rhino Junior High	Lydia Lopez	Also served as voice director
1999	Mythic Warriors: Guardians of the Legend	Pandora	(1 episode); "Prometheus & Pandora's Box"
2001	Committed	Tisha	(1 episode, uncredited); "Beauty is in the eye of the Beholden"
2001–2002	Quads!	Franny	Main role; 26 episodes
2004	6teen	Betti	(1 episode); "The Five Finger Discount"
2004	Franny's Feet	Additional voices	6 episodes
2005	Rotting Hills	Missy	TV short
2005	Interlude	Aya Watsuji	Main role; 3 episodes
2007–2008	Care Bears: Adventures in Care-a-lot	Love-a-Lot Bear	Main role; 17 episodes
2022	Bee and PuppyCat: Lazy in Space	Toast, Tempbot	Main role; 9 episodes

=== Web series ===
Year	Title	Role	Notes
2016	Bee and PuppyCat	Toast	Episode: "Toast"
2022	Lady Ada's Secret Society	Headmistress Hein	(9 episodes);

Preceded by Tracey Moore	Voice of Sailor Moon; Eps. 12 - 14, 16 - 20, 22 - 82, Movies	Succeeded by Linda Ballantyne
