= Sugar Lyn Beard =

Canadian actress

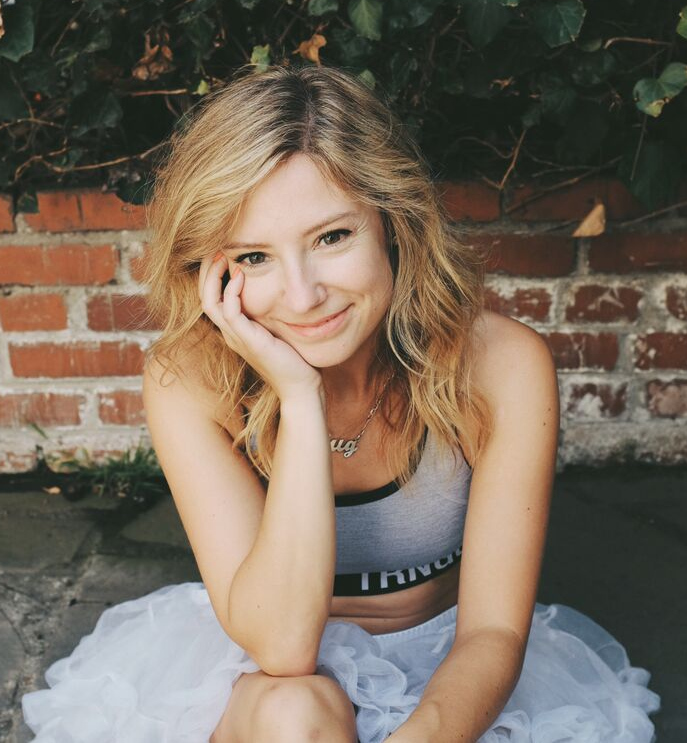
- Beard in June 2016
- Born: Stephanie Lyn Beard; Scarborough, Ontario, Canada
- Other names: Sugar; Sug; Suga BayBee
- Occupations: Actress; radio personality
- Years active: 1999–present

Stephanie "Sugar" Lyn Beard is a Canadian television and film actress and radio personality. She co-hosted The Zone on the YTV channel from 2001 to 2007.

== Early life ==
Beard was born in Scarborough, Ontario to Bonnita and Winston Beard. Her Suga BayBee was also a character on the Mad Dog and Billie morning show formerly aired on Toronto radio station KISS 92.5. Beard's squeaky-voiced character began appearing on KISS when Beard was 19 years old and otherwise working as a sales clerk.

== Career ==
Beard's character "Suga BayBee" was also a character on the Mad Dog and Billie morning show formerly aired on Toronto radio station KISS 92.5. Beard's squeaky-voiced character began appearing on KISS when Beard was 19 years old and otherwise working as a sales clerk.

Beard's voice in 2000 was most known as the voice of Sailor Mini Moon in the Cloverway adaptation of Sailor Moon. From June 2001 to January 26, 2007, Beard hosted and produced The Zone, a series of short interstitial segments that aired between regular weekday programming on the Canadian children's network YTV. Between 2002 and 2007, the programming block was hosted by both Beard and Carlos Bustamante, another long-time YTV host that was the host of The Zone from 2002-2018. She also hosted additional programs like Sugar & Avril: A Zone Special. She and Bustamante hosted a weekly hour-long program, Plugged In, on the Corus Entertainment website boomboxbaby.ca.

She also had a column in the youth newspaper, Brand New Planet; it was distributed with subscriptions to the Toronto Star only. In 2006, the Star put her on the long list for Children's Entertainment, when creating their Essentially Canadian Top 10 lists.

Among her works, she played the role of Susan in the 2011 film 50/50 and the character Fiona in two episodes of season 6 of Weeds. She also played Krissy in the 2012 film For a Good Time, Call..., and Jeanie in the 2016 comedy Mike and Dave Need Wedding Dates.

== Filmography ==
=== Film ===
Year	Title	Role	Notes
2004	Care Bears: Journey to Joke-a-lot	Wish Bear	Voice
2005	The Care Bears' Big Wish Movie	Wish Bear	Voice
2010	True Story. Based on Things That Never Actually Happened. ...And Some That Did	Amanda	
2010	Not Quite College	Jessica	
2011	Stag	Mary	
2011	Darla	Loud Mouth	
2011	50/50	Susan	
2012	For a Good Time, Call...	Krissy	
2012	Living Loaded	Maureen	
2015	Aloha	Global One Volunteer	
2016	Mike and Dave Need Wedding Dates	Jeanie	
2016	Sausage Party	Baby Carrots, Cookies	Voice
2017	Captain Underpants: The First Epic Movie	Goodie Two-Shoes Girl	Voice
2017	The Disaster Artist	Actress No. 2	
2017	Palm Swings	Allison Hughes	
2018	Game Over, Man!	Herself	
2018	The Package	Sheryl	
2020	Unpregnant	Kate	
2020	Eat Wheaties!	Carla Fisk	
2025	Little Lorraine	Nancy	
2025	Halfway Haunted	Stephanie	
2026	Tangles	Flight Attendant	Voice
2026	The Wrong Girls	Mr. Kock	

=== Television ===
Year	Title	Role	Notes
2000	Sailor Moon	Serenity "Rini" Tsukino/Sailor Mini Moon	Voice, 77 episodes (Cloverway dub)
2000	The Red Green Show	Kelly Cook	2 episodes (S10E1 "Sausage Envy") (S10E6 "Survivor")
2001–2002	Pecola	Coco	Voice
2001	The Santa Claus Brothers	Luisa	Voice
2001–2007	The Zone	Herself	Host and producer
2002	Franklin	Betty Beaver	Voice, episode: "Franklin and Betty"
2002	Beyblade G-Revolution	Ming Ming	Voice, 8 episodes
2003	The Save-Ums!	Olena Octopus	Voice
2003	Odd Job Jack	Meryl Mouse	Voice, episode: "The Wheel Is Not Enough"
2003–2004	The World of Piwi	Sunny, Brooklyn	
2004	Cyberchase	Creech	Voice, 4 episodes
2004	Miss Spider's Sunny Patch Friends	Sweetie	Voice, episode: "Country Bug-Kin"
2004	Kevin Hill	Santa's Helper	Voice, episode: "Love Don't Live Here Anymore"
2005	Atomic Betty	Cadets	Voice, 2 episodes
2005–2008	Harry and His Bucket Full of Dinosaurs	Nancy the Nanosaurus	Voice, 7 episodes
2006	Sons of Butcher	Bar Girl	Voice, 3 episodes
2006	Captain Flamingo	Kirsten McBradden	Voice
2006–2009	Di-Gata Defenders	Kara	Voice, 34 episodes
2009	King of the Hill	Michael Savage	Voice, episode: "Uncool Customer"
2009–2012	The Amazing Spiez!	Tami	Voice, 52 episodes
2010	Weeds	Fiona	2 episodes
2012	The Mindy Project	Claire	Episode: "Hiring and Firing"
2013	Ghost Ghirls	Becky	Episode: "Something Borrowed, Something Boo"
2014	Garfunkel and Oates	Epiphany	Episode: "Rule 34"
2015	You're the Worst	Justine	Episode: "Born Dead"
2016, 2019	Drunk History	Catharine Fox, Herself/Narrator	2 episodes
2017–2018, 2023	The Flash	Becky Sharpe / Hazard, Clifford DeVoe / Thinker (in Hazard's body)	4 episodes
2022–present	Super Wish	Ronny Bobby Candle #4	Voice
2023-2026	Open Season: Call of Nature	Sugar	Voice
2024	Sausage Party: Foodtopia	Jeri Rice	Voice
2025	The Studio	Rebecca Chan-Sanders	Episode: "The Pediatric Oncologist"

=== Radio ===
- Mad Dog and Billie on KISS 92.5 (2000–2001) – Suga BayBee
