= Susan Roman =

Canadian voice actress

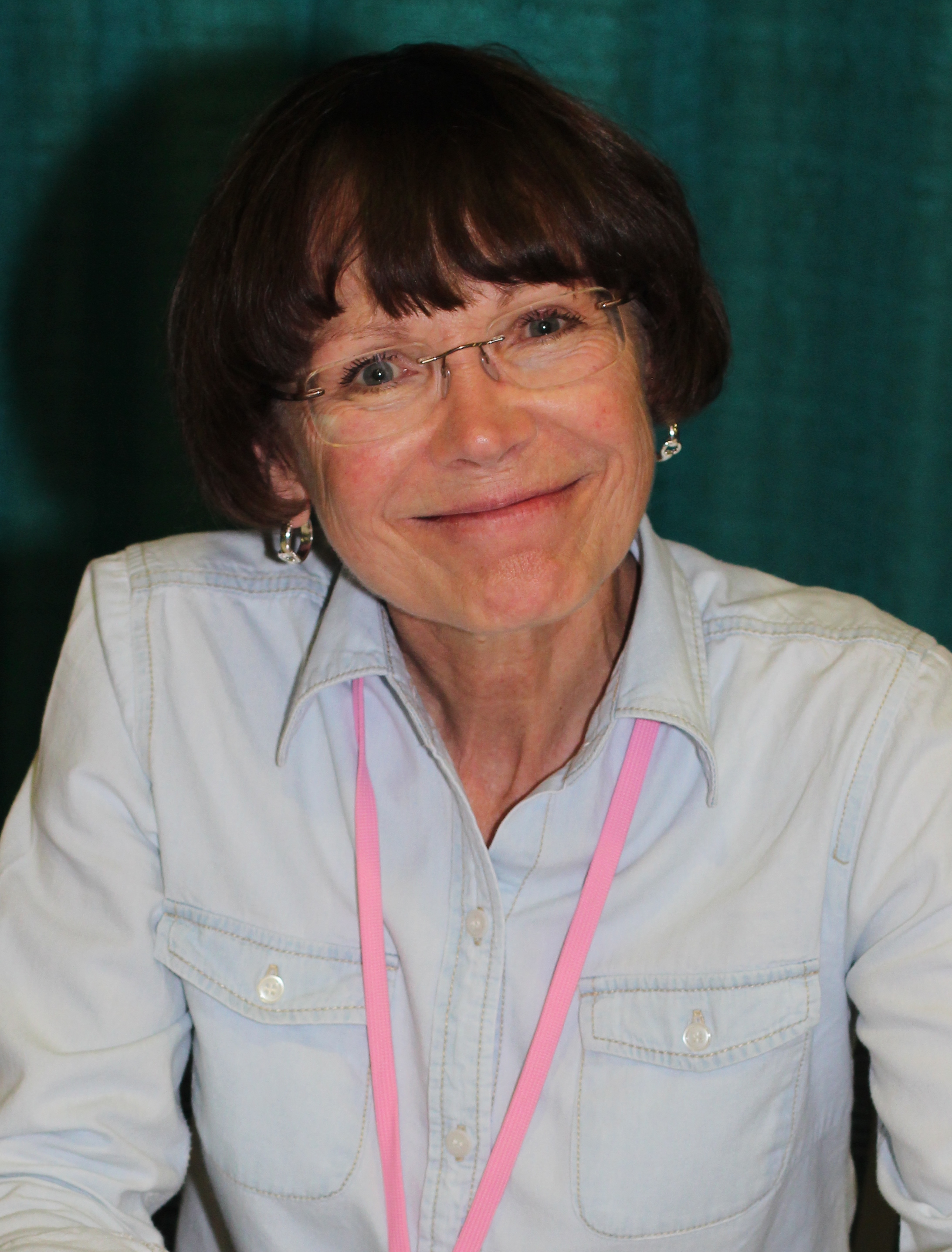
- Roman in 2014
- Occupations: Actress; voice director
- Years active: 1977–present
- Agent: Edna Talent Management LTD

Susan Roman is a Canadian television and voice actress and voice director, best known for voice acting the roles of James in Thomas and The Magic Railroad and Lita/Sailor Jupiter in the Canada DiC (and later Cloverway/CWi) dub of the anime Sailor Moon. She is one of the few voice actors to remain throughout the entire run of the Sailor Moon series.

== Career ==
Early in her career, she appeared in Rabid, and starred in the television series Flappers. She was also a runner-up for the role of Chrissy in Three's Company.

Roman's other best-known role was the voice of Melissa Raccoon from the second season of The Raccoons until the end of the series. She also provided the vocal characterization for Snowy's dog sounds in the television series The Adventures of Tintin.

In 2000, Roman voiced James the Red Engine in Thomas and the Magic Railroad. She has also played Mayor Amelia in the English version of Mega Man Legends, Mega Man Trigger in the English version of Mega Man Legends 2, and the voice of Harry's mom in the television series Harry and His Bucket Full of Dinosaurs.

She played the voice of two Care Bears in different decades: Champ Bear in the Care Bears TV series, and Good Luck Bear in Care Bears: Journey to Joke-a-lot (2004) and The Care Bears' Big Wish Movie (2005).

She played the voice of Oliver and Judy Tate in Beyblade as well as Salima in Beyblade V-Force. She had a recurring guest role as several characters in the 1990s X-Men animated series.

Also, she was the speaking voice of Angel, the heroine of Nelvana's first full-length film, 1983's Rock & Rule.

Susan voices Joe's Mom in the TV Series Time Warp Trio and Zozo in Weird Years and also Tika in Barbie as the Island Princess.

She has also voice directed the North American / Canadian dubbed versions of the British children's TV series Tom and Vicky and Animal Shelf that aired on It's Itsy Bitsy Time.

== Filmography ==
=== Anime ===
- Bakugan Battle Brawlers – Akira
- Beyblade – Judy, Salima, Oliver
- Beyblade: Metal Masters, Beyblade: Metal Fury – Chi-yun Li
- Keroppi and Friends – Pekkle (Pekkle segments only)
- Sailor Moon – Sailor Jupiter (DiC/Cloverway dub)
- Sailor Moon R the Movie: Promise of the Rose – Sailor Jupiter (Pioneer/Optimum Productions dub)
- Sailor Moon S the Movie: Hearts in Ice – Sailor Jupiter (Pioneer/Optimum Productions dub)
- Sailor Moon Super S the Movie: Black Dream Hole – Sailor Jupiter (Pioneer/Optimum Productions dub)

=== Animation ===
- Ace Ventura: Pet Detective – Additional Voices
- The Accuser – Lucia, Fore, Nurse
- The Adventures of Super Mario Bros. 3 – Additional Voices
- The Adventures of Tintin: The Series – Snowy
- The Avengers: United They Stand – Moonstone, Dragonfly, Vertigo, Reptilla, Virgo
- Babar – Additional Voices
- Beetlejuice – Bea Juice, Miss Shapen
- Bill & Ted's Excellent Adventures – Additional Voices
- Birdz – Eddie Storkowitz
- The Busy World of Richard Scarry – Cucumber, Professor Dog, April Rhino, Squirty, Additional Voices
- Barbie as the Island Princess – Tika
- Cadillacs and Dinosaurs – Hannah Dundee
- The Care Bears Family – Champ Bear (Season 3 only)
- The Country Mouse and the City Mouse Adventures
- Creative Galaxy – Mom
- Care Bears: Journey to Joke-a-lot – Good Luck Bear
- The Care Bears' Big Wish Movie – Good Luck Bear
- Ella the Elephant – Mrs. Potter
- Franklin – Beatrice
- Flappers – May
- Franny's Feet – Additional voices
- The Franny Strong Show – Franny Eunice Strong (US/Canada Version)
- Freaky Stories – Narrator
- Garbage Pail Kids
- Enfants Directeurs – Franny Eunice Strong, Milli Cyrus (Mrs. Cyrus)
- Hammerman – Hammerman's Would-Be Girlfriend
- Harry and His Bucket Full of Dinosaurs – Mom
- Heavy Metal – Girl, Satellite
- The Incredible Crash Dummies – Computer
- King of Kensington – Miss Ontario, Peggy
- The Koala Brothers – Lolly (1st voice only)
- Little People: Big Discoveries – Eddie, Sarah Lynn, Firefighter Cheryl
- Learn to Be a Princess – Tika
- Love & Murder – Elizabeth Mazzoula
- The Magic of Herself the Elf – voice of Wood Pink
- Mattimeo: A Tale of Redwall – Jess, Rosyqueen Stump
- Maxie's World – Ashley
- Medabots – Natalie
- Men – Marsha
- Miss BG – Mom
- Miss Spider's Sunny Patch Friends – Cookie
- Mythic Warriors – Aspasia
- My Big Big Friend – Yuri's Mother
- A Miser Brothers' Christmas – Tinsel, Dr. Noel, Others
- The Newcomers
- Nicky Note – Amy
- The Nutcracker Prince – Mouse, Mrs. Miller, Guest #1, Doll, Spectator
- Pandalian – Bingo
- Piggsburg Pigs! – Lorelei
- The Raccoons – Melissa Raccoon (1987–1991)
- Redwall – Jess Squirrel
- Robocop: The Animated Series – Officer Anne Lewis
- Rabid – Mindy Kent
- Rock & Rule – Angel
- Rolie Polie Olie – Fifi
- Sanity Clause – Kathy
- Special People – Annie
- Spyburbia – Mom
- Starcom: The U.S. Space Force – Lt. Kelsey Carver (Starbase Command)
- Strawberry Shortcake and the Baby Without a Name – Orange Blossum, Peach Blush
- Strawberry Shortcake: Housewarming Surprise – Ada, Blueberry Muffin, Crepe Suzette
- Strawberry Shortcake Meets the Berrykins – Berry Princess, Peach Blush, Peach Berrykin
- The Special Magic of Herself the Elf – Wood Pink
- The Incredible Crash Dummies – Computer voice
- Thomas and the Magic Railroad – James the Red Engine
- Time Warp Trio – Joe's Mom
- TweenKidz – Alyson Charlette (US version)
- The Turner Brothers – Lolly (1st voice only)
- The World of Piwi – Tank (1st voice), William (1st voice)
- Weird Years – Zozo Dorkovitch
- Wish Kid – Additional Voices
- X-Men – Bella Donna, Amelia Voght, Callisto, Scarlet Witch, Warlock's Life-Mate

=== Video games ===
- Bakugan: Battle Brawlers – Akira
- Barbie as the Island Princess – Tika
- Laura's Happy Adventures – Laura
- Mega Man Legends – Mayor Amelia
- Mega Man Legends 2 – Mega Man Trigger

=== Live-action ===
- Flappers – May
- King of Kensington – Peggy, Miss Ontario
- Rabid – Mindy Kent
- Street Legal – Kathleen Sheridan
- The Twilight Zone – Leslie Sellick
- Thomas and the Magic Railroad – James the Red Engine (voice)

== Production staff ==
=== Voice director ===
- Animal Shelf (USA/Canadian dub)
- Tom and Vicky (USA/Canadian dub)
