= Sunday Muse =

Canadian actress

- Occupation: Actress
- Years active: 1994–present
- Website: www.sundaymuse.com

Sunday Muse is a Canadian actress.

== Early life ==
Muse was born to an Italian mother.

== Filmography ==
- Squawk Box (1994) as Various
- Rolie Polie Olie (1999–2004) as Binky/Bogey Bot
- Mega Man Legends 2 (2000) as Shu
- Undergrads (2001)
- Rescue Heroes: The Movie (2003) as Mom
- Franny's Feet (2003) as Li-Mei
- Care Bears: Journey to Joke-a-lot (2004) as Cheer Bear
- JoJo's Circus (2004)
- Arthur (2004)
- The Care Bears' Big Wish Movie (2005) as Cheer Bear
- Time Warp Trio (2005–2006) as Fredricka "Freddi"
- Jane and the Dragon (2006) as Pepper
- Yam Roll (2006) as Minamiko
- Odd Job Jack (2007)
- The Future Is Wild (2007)
- Bakugan Battle Brawlers (2008–2009)
- Willa's Wild Life (2008–2013) as Kara
- Jimmy Two-Shoes (2009–2011) as Saffi
- The Cat in the Hat Knows a Lot About That! (2011)
- Total Drama: Pahkitew Island (2014) as Ella
- Total DramaRama (2020) as Ella
