= Care Bears: Share Bear Shines =

- Australian (Region 4) DVD cover
- Directed by: Larry Houston
- Written by: Thomas Hart
- Produced by: Robert Winthrop
- Starring: Tracey Moore; Anna Cummer; Tabitha St. Germain; Ashleigh Ball; Ian James Corlett; Scott McNeil
- Music by: Carl Johnson
- Production companies: SD Entertainment; American Greetings
- Distributed by: Kidtoon Films
- Release dates: March 10, 2010 (Australia); August 15, 2010 (United States)
- Running time: 70 minutes
- Country: United States
- Language: English

Care Bears: Share Bear Shines is a 2010 American animated adventure film featuring the Care Bear Power Team. The film was produced by SD Entertainment and Shari Lewis Enterprises, who also made 2007's Care Bears: Oopsy Does It!.

== Cast ==
- Tracey Moore - Share Bear
- Anna Cummer - Princess Starglow
- Tabitha St. Germain - Cheer Bear
- Ashleigh Ball - Oopsy Bear
- Ian James Corlett - Funshine Bear
- Scott McNeil - Grumpy Bear

== Plot ==
Share Bear and a Twinklet named Gleamer lead a mission in caring when they travel to Glitter City, where Princess Starglo trains Twinklets to become stars. Because no one believes in Princess Starglo, her confidence has dimmed so she's turning out lights all over the night sky. With the help of the Care Power Team, Share Bear gets things glowing again in this adventure.

== Release ==
Share Bear Shines premiered on DVD in Australia on March 10, 2010, through Magna Pacific. In the United States, the film had a limited released to theaters on August 15, as part of Kidtoon Films' matinee program, and was released on DVD through Lionsgate on November 6, 2010.

== Reception ==
"Parents with a working knowledge of how the stars, sun, constellations, and universe work might have difficulty watching this DVD with their children, since it gives such a magical explanation for their existence. On the other hand, Share Bear's unwavering conviction in Princess Starglo should prove a worthwhile example for parents looking to discuss the importance of keeping faith even when no one around you feels the same," wrote Common Sense Media.
