= Pino van Lamsweerde =

Italian–Canadian director and animator (1940–2020)

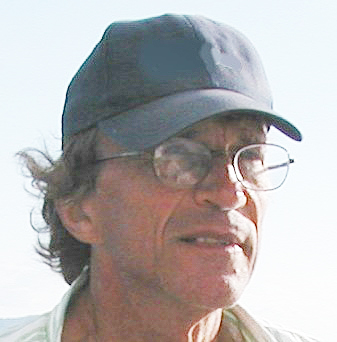
- Pino van Lamsweerde in 2002
- Born: Giuseppe van Lamsweerde; 18 September 1940 Turin, Italy
- Died: 10 April 2020 (aged 79) Paris, France
- Area: Artist

Pino van Lamsweerde (9 September 1940 – 10 April 2020) was an Italian–Canadian director and animator.

== Personal life ==
Born in Turin on 18 September 1940 to Alessandro van Lamsweerde and Giuliana Tracanella, he moved with his family at a very young age to Milan, where later in life he attended the Brera Academy, specializing in the nudist school. In 1966, he emigrated to Canada, with a brief period in New York City, where he would remain until 1997, living between Toronto, Ottawa, Vancouver and Montreal. In 1997, he moved to Paris, where he remained until his death.

== Professional career ==
He started working in Milan doing artwork and graphics by designing advertising posters. In 1968, he collaborated on the feature film The Magic Bird.

In 1969, after moving to Montreal, he began as an animator working on the movie Tiki Tiki. In the 70s, he worked on the series Wait Till Your Father Gets Home by Hanna-Barbera between Sydney and Vancouver. In 1973, he joined the team of 15 directors of the medium-length film Man: The Polluter.

In the mid-1970s, he settled in Ottawa, where he worked for Atkinson Film Arts as an animation director and then as a director. In 1981, he worked on the film Heavy Metal, in which he directed the Harry Canyon segment.

He remained there until 1985, when he moved to Paris to work as a director on the feature film Asterix in Britain.

In 1987, he moved to Montreal to work as a director, animation director, designer and storyboard artist on several animated television series, such as The Smoggies, The Nutcracker Prince, The Legend of White Fang, and Spirou et Fantasio.

In 1997, he moved to Paris once again, to settle there permanently, except for a brief period in 1999 in Milan, when he co-directed a few animated episodes inspired by the character Corto Maltese, a co-production between Animation Band, Stranemani, and Rai.

== Death ==
He died in Paris on 10 April 2020, aged 79, of complications from COVID-19.

== Filmography ==
=== Director ===
- 1973: Man: The Polluter
- 1981: Heavy Metal (Harry Canyon)
- 1983: The Care Bears in the Land Without Feelings
- 1984: The Care Bears Battle the Freeze Machine
- 1985: The Velveteen Rabbit
- 1985: Rumpelstiltskin
- 1986: Asterix in Britain
- 1993: Spirou et Fantasio

=== Animation ===
- 1971: Tiki Tiki
- 1971: In a Nutshell
- 1973: Man: The Polluter
- 1973-1974: Wait Till Your Father Gets Home (5 episodes)
- 1975: The Energy Carol
- 1978: The Little Brown Burro
- 1979: The New Misadventures of Ichabod Crane
- 1979: Tukiki and His Search for a Merry Christmas
- 1981: Heavy Metal
- 1990: The Nutcracker Prince
- 1992: The Legend of White Fang
- 2004: Dragon Hunters
- 2006: Monster Allergy
