= The Care Bears' Big Wish Movie =

Care Bears' Big Wish Movie
- Promotional poster
- Directed by: Larry Jacobs; Ron Pitts
- Written by: Jeffrey Alan Schechter
- Produced by: Cynthia Taylor
- Starring: Sugar Lyn Beard; Robert Tinkler; Julie Lemieux; Linda Ballantyne; Stephen Ouimette; Tracey Hoyt; Ron Rubin; Elizabeth Hanna
- Edited by: Jason Cohen
- Music by: Ian Thomas
- Production companies: Nelvana Limited (Note: Animation outsourced to Crest Animation Productions); Those Characters from Cleveland
- Distributed by: Lions Gate Home Entertainment
- Release dates: September 7, 2005 (TIFF); October 17, 2005 (Disney Channel); October 18, 2005 (North America)
- Running time: 75 minutes
- Countries: Canada; United States
- Language: English
- Budget: US$3–5 million

The Care Bears' Big Wish Movie is a 2005 direct-to-video animated musical fantasy film, produced by Nelvana Limited and released by Lions Gate Home Entertainment. Directed by Larry Jacobs and Ron Pitts, and written by Jeffrey Alan Schechter, the film is a follow-up to the Care Bears' previous efforts in 2004's Journey to Joke-a-lot. It was the fifth film to feature the Bears, and the second to be computer-animated.

The Big Wish Movie centers on Wish Bear, a Care Bear who can make and grant wishes. After some of them do not work, she feels worried that the other bears have overlooked her abilities, and wishes for a few new friends who care more than she does. Those three—Messy Bear, Me Bear and Too Loud Bear—cause further trouble for Wish Bear, her wishing star Twinkers, and all of Care-a-lot.

As with Journey to Joke-a-lot, Toronto's Nelvana produced and self-financed the Big Wish Movie; additional work was handled by India's Crest Animation Productions. Production involved various personnel from the previous film, among them Ron Pitts, composer Ian Thomas and various voice actors including Stephanie Beard, Stevie Vallance and Julie Lemieux. The Big Wish Movie was released on DVD by Lions Gate on October 18, 2005; prior to this, it premiered on U.S. and Canadian television, and was accompanied by a tie-in book from Scholastic Press. It subsequently received favourable reviews from Parenting magazine and the Pittsburgh Post-Gazette. This was Nelvana's final production with the Care Bears, before SD Entertainment of California assumed responsibility for future installments in the franchise.

== Plot ==
This movie starts when, atop the roof of an observatory at their cloud-filled home of Care-a-lot, the Care Bears hear Wish Bear's story of how she (as a cub) found her new friend, a wishing star named Twinkers. The Care Bears are touched by this tale, but are a bit worried when she uses Twinkers' inherent power to wish them all some popcorn. Cheer Bear raises concern that this may be a frivolous use of Twinkers' power. Wish Bear, however, assures everyone that she is a trained professional.

The next day, Wish Bear uses the wishing power to help her friends. She wishes for plenty of rainbow sap for Share Bear, and for Grumpy Bear's rocket to have "zoom", but the wishes backfire when the sap overflows and the rocket spins out of control.

A monthly meeting of Care-a-lot's steering committee (with Champ Bear presiding) reveals a problem with the Caring Meter. The machine, which measures how much caring there is in Care-a-lot, has moved towards the rain-cloud side. Wish Bear suggests using her wishes, but is rejected since not all of them work as intended; they didn't like their wishes ("I Wish"). Disappointed, she decides to wish for other bears who like wishing as much as she does. This causes three new bears to arrive in Care-a-lot: Too Loud Bear, Me Bear, and Messy Bear.

Everyone is pleased to welcome the new neighbors at first, but things soon get out of control. The new bears unwittingly make a huge mess of everything (especially when the huge mansion they asked for causes pollution). Then, during another meeting, the bears decide to have a picnic to teach the new bears how thing really work in Care-a-lot. It turns out however they've already got the wrong idea ("Get a Lot") and the picnic in a mess. After confessing that she's the reason there are new bears, Wish Bear confronts them but they don't listen, causing Wish Bear to accidentally wish Twinkers away to them. They promise to return him the afternoon the next day, but once Funshine Bear talks to Wish Bear about how empty she is without Twinkers, she decides to go back early. When she gets there, the new bears have abused the star's power with the mansion becoming a castle, a huge noisy motorcycle for Too Loud Bear, an amusement park focusing on Me Bear, and making a mud pie for Messy Bear. Once the new bears finally realize their problem, Messy Bear, being less caring, tries to fix it with more wishes, but to no avail. Care-a-lot becomes a blank white space (wishing that all of this was gone), the bears begin to glow in color (wishing for everything to be back how it was, but with more color), Grumpy Bear turns black and white (wishing for less color), and Messy turns himself into a cub (wishing for everything to be like it used to be). When he tries to wish Twinkers back to Wish Bear, the star ultimately loses his power from exhaustion (because they had been pushing him much too hard). Wish Bear uses Grumpy Bear's rocket to bring him to the Big Wish, a grandmother star, in the sky with Messy bear joining them as an atonement. Big Wish restores his power, but not before Wish Bear assures her that she has learned her lesson, which is wishing is fun, but it is far more important to work hard to achieve your dreams.

Wish Bear tells them that wishes are not an effective solution any more, and everyone works together to make their home beautiful again ("It Takes You and Me"). At the end, Me Bear, Messy Bear, and Too Loud Bear, having seen the error of their ways, apologize and ask if they can still live in Care-a-lot. The rest of the bears agree and decide to go on a road trip.

== Cast ==
- Sugar Lyn Beard as Wish Bear
- Stephen Ouimette as Too Loud Bear
- Tracey Hoyt as Me Bear
- Ron Rubin as Messy Bear
- Scott McCord as Bedtime Bear
- Linda Ballantyne as Champ Bear
- Sunday Muse as Cheer Bear
- Catherine Disher as Friend Bear
- Julie Lemieux as Funshine Bear
- Susan Roman as Good Luck Bear
- Robert Tinkler as Grumpy Bear
- Athena Karkanis as Harmony Bear
- Angela Maiorano as Love-a-lot Bear
- Stevie Vallance as Share Bear
- Andrew Sabiston as Tenderheart Bear
- Elizabeth Hanna as Big Wish (created as Liz Hanna)
- Richard Binsley as Twinkers
- Katie Griffin as Laugh-a-lot Bear

== Production ==
As with 2004's Journey to Joke-a-lot, The Care Bears' Big Wish Movie was self-financed by the Nelvana studios in Toronto, Ontario. The second computer-animated production with the Care Bears, it is also the franchise's fifth feature installment. Director Larry Jacobs had previously worked on another Nelvana venture, a public television series entitled Cyberchase. Mike Fallows, the director of Joke-a-lot, served as the supervising director. The film featured various voices from Joke-a-lot, among them Stephanie Beard, Julie Lemieux, Stevie Vallance, Robert Tinkler, Andrew Sabiston and Scott McCord. Animation was handled by Nelvana in Canada, and Crest Animation Productions in India. Big Wish marked the last time Nelvana embarked on a Care Bears project; from 2006 onward, the California-based SD Entertainment was responsible for future animated fare with these characters, starting with Oopsy Does It! in 2007.

== Release ==
The Care Bears' Big Wish Movie first aired on Canadian television on October 3, 2005; in the United States, it premiered on cable television's Disney Channel and Playhouse Disney on October 17. (Note: Listed as "FILM 226388" on The New York Times' television schedule at the time.) The day before the U.S. premiere, it became one of Lions Gate Home Entertainment's five direct-to-DVD "marquee" offerings for young viewers; (Note: During late 2005, Lions Gate's other "marquee" titles were Barbie and the Magic of Pegasus, Inspector Gadget's Biggest Caper Ever, Miss Spider's Sunny Patch Friends and Pinocchio 3000.) restaurant chain Burger King served as the promotional partner. Twice during 2005, Stephanie Beard (the voice of Wish Bear) promoted the film in the Toronto Star under the alias Suga Baybee; in October, she proclaimed that it "is going to be a classic". The film charted on Video Business' Top Kids Rentals list for January 23, 2006, where it ranked 20th. On August 11, 2007, it placed seventh on Billboard's Top Kid DVD Sales chart. Jeffrey Alan Schechter, the film's writer, was nominated for a Writers Guild of Canada Award. The film is known under two French-language titles: À vos souhaits les Calinours ! (in Canada's Quebec province) and De Nouveaux Arrivants chez les Bisounours (in France).

Days before the release of the Big Wish Movie, Scholastic Press published a Care Bears storybook based on the film; it was written by Sonia Sander and illustrated by Jay Johnson. One scene in the book involves Wish Bear and the three new Bears grocery shopping; this does not appear in the film. Later in the book, when Messy Bear wishes for everything to be like it used to be, it causes the Bears to travel back to the age of the dinosaurs; in the film, Twinkers just turns Messy Bear into Messy Cub.

Bruce Kluger of Parenting magazine referred to the Big Wish Movie as "Cute stuff, if a tad sticky-sweet: Heart-shaped toothbrushes, toasters, and waffles abound." Cristina Rouvalis of the Pittsburgh Post-Gazette gave it three stars out of four, and said that "Young Care Bear fanatics will wish for more." In April 2010's Journal of Aging Studies, Sylvia Henneberg commented that Big Wish, the grandmother star, served as "a poor substitute for a truly three-dimensional maternal figure".

== Music ==
The music for the Big Wish Movie was composed by Ian Thomas (also from Journey to Joke-a-lot), and conducted and orchestrated by Peter Cardinali. At his studio, Thomas worked with the Hamilton Children's Choir on the film's opening theme. In February 2005, Stephanie Beard said that "I Wish", a track she performed, "is my favorite cartoon song yet. It's so cute; I can't wait for the world to hear it."

Song	Writer	Performer(s)	Producer(s)	Notes
"Big Wish Theme"	—	Members of The Hamilton Children's Choir	—	Conducted by Zimfira Poloz; choir recorded by Bob Doidge; assisted by Amy King at Grant Avenue Studio, Hamilton, Ontario
"I Wish"	Creighton Doane; Daniel Gerrard Leblanc	Stephanie Beard	Creighton Doane; Daniel Gerrard Leblanc	Song animation by Ron Pitts
"Get a Lot"	Noah Shilkin and Amos Carlen; The Brumby Brothers	Cast	Noah Shilkin and Amos Carlen; The Brumby Brothers	
"It Takes You and Me"	Creighton Doane; Daniel Gerrard Leblanc	Michael Borkosky	Creighton Doane; Daniel Gerrard Leblanc	
"The Power of Wishing"	Anthony Vanderburgh; Don Breithaupt	Daniel Galessierre	—	

== See also ==
- List of Canadian films of 2005
- List of Nelvana franchises
- List of computer-animated films
- List of animated feature-length films
