= The Saul Group =

- Industry: Television syndication
- Headquarters: New York City, United States
- Key people: Neil B. Saul, President
- Services: Syndication sales, media purchases for children's television

The Saul Group was a broadcast syndication service that operated in the U.S. during the 1980s. Headed by president Neil B. Saul, the company was based in New York City and worked on behalf of toy companies through media purchases and advertising sales. One of its partners was LJN, also in New York City.

The Saul Group distributed Rambo: The Force of Freedom and The Centurions (on behalf of Worldvision Enterprises); beginning in 1988, it partnered with SFM Entertainment to package Nelvana's Care Bears series for local stations. Other shows on its roster included Zoobilee Zoo, Jayce and the Wheeled Warriors and The Funtastic World of Hanna-Barbera.
