= Care Bears =

Fictional character group

- The 10 original Care Bears in the logo for the 1980s franchise, with Tenderheart Bear at the top
- Created by: Those Characters from Cleveland (Cloudco Entertainment)
- Original work: Greeting cards published by American Greetings (1981)
- Owner: Authentic Brands Group
- Years: 1981–present

Print publications
- Books: See List of Care Bears books

Films and television
- Films: Theatrical: The Care Bears Movie (1985); Care Bears Movie II: A New Generation (1986); The Care Bears Adventure in Wonderland (1987); Care Bears: Oopsy Does It! (2007); Care Bears: To the Rescue (2010); Direct-to-DVD: Care Bears: Journey to Joke-a-lot (2004); The Care Bears' Big Wish Movie (2005); Care Bears: Share Bear Shines (2010); Care Bears: The Giving Festival (2010)
- Television series: Care Bears (1985); The Care Bears Family (1986–88); Care Bears: Adventures in Care-a-lot (2007–08); Care Bears: Welcome to Care-a-Lot (2012); Care Bears & Cousins (2015–16); Care Bears: Unlock the Magic (2019–2024); Specials: The Care Bears in the Land Without Feelings (1983); The Care Bears Battle the Freeze Machine (1984); Care Bears Nutcracker Suite (1988)

Audio
- Soundtracks: The Care Bears Movie (1985); Care Bears Movie II: A New Generation (1986); Care Bears: Journey to Joke-a-lot (2004); The Care Bears (Thomas J Dwyer Generation)
- Original music: See List of Care Bears albums

Miscellaneous
- Toy: Various
- Original artwork by: Elena Kucharik

Care Bears are multi-colored bears, painted in 1981 by artist Elena Kucharik to be used on greeting cards from American Greetings. They were turned into plush teddy bears and featured in the animated TV specials The Care Bears in the Land Without Feelings (1983) and The Care Bears Battle the Freeze Machine (1984) before headlining their own television series called Care Bears from 1985 to 1988. They also had multiple feature films, including The Care Bears Movie (1985), Care Bears Movie II: A New Generation (1986), and The Care Bears Adventure in Wonderland (1987).

Each Care Bear is a different color or shade and has a unique image on their stomach (referred to in various media as "tummy symbols" or "belly badges") that represents their personality or specialty. The Care Bears family also include the Care Bear Cousins, which feature different animals, such as a lion, sheep, penguin, elephant, rabbit, raccoon, dog, cat, monkey, pig and horse created in the same style as the Care Bears.

In 2002, new plush versions of the bears were manufactured by Play Along Toys. This relaunch of the franchise featured in three animated films: Care Bears: Journey to Joke-a-lot (2004), The Care Bears' Big Wish Movie (2005), and Care Bears: Oopsy Does It! (2007).

A revival TV series, Care Bears: Welcome to Care-a-Lot, premiered on The Hub on June 2, 2012, for one season. A continuation with the same characters, Care Bears & Cousins, was commissioned by Netflix and premiered in 2015. That year, toy company Just Play debuted a range of Care Bears toys (plush, figurines, and blind bag collectibles) based on the series.

The most recent TV series, Care Bears: Unlock the Magic, debuted on Boomerang SVOD on February 1, 2019, and has since tied in with a new toy line from Basic Fun.

== History ==
=== Development ===
The Care Bears were created in 1981 by Elena Kucharik for the greeting card company American Greetings. Jack Chojnacki, the co-president of Those Characters From Cleveland (TCFC) (the toy and licensing design division of American Greetings), introduced the first Care Bear to businessmen from American Greetings and from the toy company Kenner in February 1981. On the employees' reaction to the toy, Chojnacki recalled in early 1985: "It had a high aaaaaah factor."

Artist Muriel Fahrion, who helped create Strawberry Shortcake's look, was among the franchise's first concept artists. Working with TCFC Creative VP Ralph Shaffer, Fahrion designed the first six bears, using the company's most popular greeting card themes for their tummy graphics. Susan Trentel, Muriel's sister and doll designer of Strawberry Shortcake, designed the first Care Bears plush. Once out of the concept stage, children's book illustrator Elena Kucharik became the lead artist for the Care Bears, creating hundreds of full-color illustrations for books, clothing, stationery and various other licensed products, as well as greeting cards. TCFC's team of artists and writers created many characters in the line in a joint development by TCFC and MAD (Marketing and Design Service of the toy group of General Mills).

American Greetings kept the character program secret until advertising was ready. At the start of the franchise, "Care Bears" was established as the project's working title.

=== 1982 launch ===
On September 24, 1982, the Care Bears franchise was launched in New York City before members of the area's Society of Security Analysts. President Morry Weiss represented American Greetings; Jack Chojnacki and senior vice-president Henry Lowenthal represented Those Characters From Cleveland.

The characters were produced as a line of toys by Kenner the following Spring, consisting of plush teddy bears and plastic poseable figures and miniatures. on a $5–6 million advertising budget and a wholesale commitment worth $122.5 million (USD). American Greetings introduced the characters to the general public in February 1983, with an appearance at New York City's Toy Fair; 26 licensees were involved upon launch. Among them was General Mills, a food company which owned the board game manufacturer Parker Brothers. In early 1983, Parker Brothers released six books featuring the Care Bears as part of its publishing division's first offerings. On television, the original 10 Bears were featured in a syndicated special, Atkinson Film-Arts' The Care Bears in the Land Without Feelings, produced and sponsored by Kenner.

In December 1983, American Greetings and CPG Products lost a lawsuit against Easter Unlimited, importers of a line known as "Message Bears". According to New York City judge Leonard B. Sand, those toys lacked the "heart-shaped 'toushee tags'" used to identify the Care Bears.

In 1984, AGC introduced a spin-off line, the Care Bear Cousins. Another syndicated special, The Care Bears Battle the Freeze Machine, aired the same year. A miniseries based on the toys was distributed by Lexington Broadcast Services Company. A year later, the Care Bears and Care Bear Cousins appeared in their first animated feature film The Care Bears Movie, produced by the Canadian animation studio Nelvana and released by The Samuel Goldwyn Company in original prints and by Metro-Goldwyn-Mayer in current prints. It became the highest-grossing animated film made outside the Disney market at the time of its release. Later that autumn, DIC Audiovisuel released an 11-episode television series in syndication, which incorporated elements from the Atkinson Film-Arts specials (with the specials' villains Professor Coldheart and his sidekick Frostbite appearing regularly, and some of the music from the specials being featured in the series) and the Nelvana film (with the Forest of Feelings, the home of the Care Bear Cousins, being a regular setting in the series).

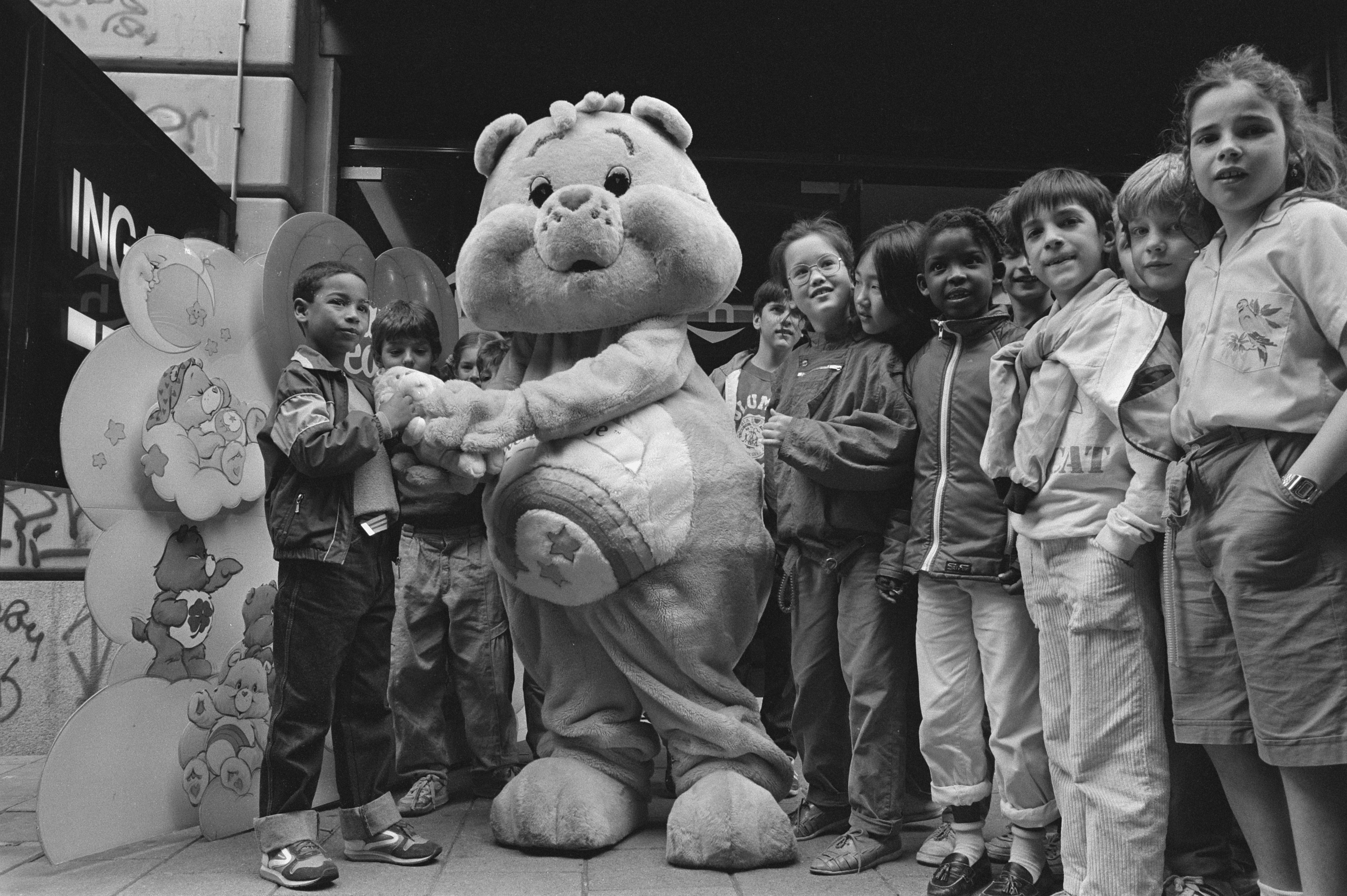
100,000th visitor to film "Care Bears" receives a gift, Amsterdam, 1986

In 1986, Nelvana returned to the franchise with a second film, Care Bears Movie II: A New Generation. Released by Columbia Pictures, the film featured a new villain, Dark Heart, and introduced more of the Care Bears and Care Bears Cousins: Harmony Bear, True Heart Bear, and Noble Heart Horse.

Later that year, the television series The Care Bears Family (also from Nelvana) premiered in mid-1986 on the U.S. ABC network and Canadian Global. Lasting three seasons and consisting of over 70 episodes, this introduced the evil wizard No Heart and his sidekick Beastly. In the second season, No Heart's niece Shreeky was introduced. It also added more development to the Care Bear and Care Bear Cousin characters, with issues such as conflict and depression being addressed through the characters themselves in some episodes.

Around the same time production for The Care Bears Family was underway, Sally Industries (now known as Sally Dark Rides) obtained a license from American Greetings and Nelvana to develop an animatronic stage show based on the franchise. This show, known as Care Bears: Care-A-Lot Castle, was produced in-house at Sally's facilities and with no involvement from the crew behind the animated series. Out of the main cast at the time, only Cheer Bear, Funshine Bear, Tenderheart Bear, Bedtime Bear, Grumpy Bear, and Friend Bear were utilized. The characters of No Heart and Beastly appear through disembodied voices recorded into the show's soundtrack, but only in the English version. Professor Coldheart, the previous villain, is mentioned in the Indonesian dub of Care-A-Lot Castle's soundtrack. Instead of using pre-existing Care Bears songs, Sally opted to produce original songs and recycle songs from their own catalog for Care-A-Lot Castle. One notable song choice, exclusive to the English version, was a cover of "Brazzle Dazzle Day" from Disney's 1977 film, Pete's Dragon. A total of two shows were built by Sally under this agreement. The first installation was located at Dunia Fantasi, an Indonesian theme park, where the show was locally translated under the name Beruang Madu (Sun Bears) complete with a dubbed soundtrack for the 1987 season. The second installation was built for Dorney Park & Wildwater Kingdom in the United States, which premiered a year later with the original English soundtrack. Both shows would operate until at least 1992, with Dorney Park's installation said to have been destroyed when the park's license expired.

The Care Bears' third film, The Care Bears Adventure in Wonderland, released by Cineplex Odeon Films, premiered in 1987. A holiday-themed television special, Care Bears Nutcracker Suite, which also served as the series finale for The Care Bears Family premiered on the Disney Channel in 1988.

Over 40 million Care Bears toys were sold between 1983 and 1987, and American Greetings printed over 70 million of their greeting cards during the decade. In whole, the sales of their merchandise reached over $2 billion during the 1980s.

=== 1991 relaunch ===
In 1991, Those Characters From Cleveland and Kenner embarked on a relaunch of the franchise, involving seven bears. One of these, Proud Heart Bear, is distinctly different from the Care Bear Cousin of a similar name, Proud Heart Cat. This character was released as a bear with white fur that sported the tummy symbol of a heart-shaped American flag. In 2003, Proud Heart Bear was re-released as a collector's edition plush toy by Play Along under the name America Cares Bear, sporting the tummy symbol of a shooting star with the colors of the American flag. Random House released two tie-in books: The Care Bears and the Big Cleanup (1991) by Bobbi Katz, and The Care Bears and the Whale Tale (1992) by Peggy Kahn.

The 1992 animated TV special The Rosey and Buddy Show, produced by Nelvana, featured the Care Bears and Care Bear Cousins in a prominent cameo appearance.

=== 2002 relaunch ===
In 1999, the rights to the Care Bears franchise were bought by Jay Foreman, the president of Fort Lauderdale, Florida-based company Play Along Toys, for less than $1 million; he also planned to acquire fellow American Greeting Cards property Strawberry Shortcake. Three years later, American Greetings relaunched the Care Bears brand as part of the Bears' 20th anniversary celebration with a series of plush toys and films.

The artwork and design of the bears were changed for the relaunch. In addition, Champ Bear's fur color was changed from golden yellow to true blue, with his tummy symbol changed from a trophy with a heart to a trophy with a star, and Share Bear's tummy symbol was changed from an ice cream soda with two straws to two lollipops crossed. The change to Share Bear's symbol stems from Play Along Toys' suggestion of the change because sharing an ice cream soda may spread germs. Furthermore, many other minor changes were made to the designs, mostly involving lightening or saturating the colors of the bears and minor redesigns to the tummy symbols.

During this revival, Play Along released brand new toys based on the newly redesigned Bears, sold at stores such as Walmart, Kmart, Toys "R" Us, Target, KB Toys, and Mervyns. The new merchandise included the Bears doing aerobics; Tenderheart Bear as a patient (casting the child playing with the toy as the doctor); Champ Bear as a firefighter; and the Care Bears themselves as Cubs, an idea previously used in the original 1980s incarnation of the franchise. Over 70 million 13-inch (330 mm) plush Bears have been sold since the re-launch.

New versions of the Care Bear Cousins were produced in 2004 (with Proud Heart Cat sporting a different fur color and the same symbol she had in the 1980s franchise). Two of the Cousins, Treat Heart Pig and Noble Heart Horse, were never produced as 13 inch plush toys in the 2000s, and the Care Bear Cousins were not relaunched in the 2007 relaunch of the franchise.

In April 2003, it was announced that a new CGI-animated movie from Nelvana, The Care Bears in King Funshine the Great, had been acquired by Artisan Entertainment for U.S. distribution. The movie was eventually renamed Care Bears: Journey to Joke-a-lot and was released on October 5, 2004 by Lions Gate Home Entertainment, as they had acquired Artisan by this point, with international distribution handled by Universal Pictures Home Entertainment. Another CGI-animated movie, The Care Bears' Big Wish Movie, was released a year later. Another CGI-animated movie from Nelvana also was planned, but later scrapped.

=== 2007 relaunch ===
In 2006, AG Properties announced that to coincide with the franchise's 25th anniversary celebrations, the Care Bears would be given a complete redesign with a new TV series and a feature-length movie titled, Care Bears: Oopsy Does It!, to be released by 20th Century Fox Home Entertainment during 2007. It also was announced that AG had acquired all of Nelvana's Care Bears projects along the way.

The new character designs were done by the American Greetings Properties' illustration team, alongside a new logo. 15 of the 39 bears were represented in this new look, while five of them were chosen to be the focus of the franchise: Cheer Bear, Funshine Bear, Grumpy Bear, Share Bear, and new addition, Oopsy Bear. In August 2007, Oopsy Does It! was given a limited theatrical release by Kidtoon Films. Essentially serving as the pilot to the traditionally-animated television series, Care Bears: Adventures in Care-a-Lot, the movie was made to introduce the new look to the public. The TV series itself would premiere on CBS on September 15, 2007, as part of its children's programming block KEWLopolis, a joint-run block by AG and DIC Entertainment, with both the movie and series being produced by SD Entertainment. A new theme song was written, known as We Are the Care Bears, and was performed by former Letters to Cleo member Kay Hanley. The associated music video premiered on Fox, Nickelodeon and MuchMusic.

As the 2007 version was a reboot, previous plot devices, such as the Cloudmobiles, the Caring Meter, the Cloud Keeper and Care-a-Lot Castle, were neither referred to nor mentioned. Instead, the Care Bears gather to meet and hold festivities at the Gathering Tree. Also in this version, the Care Bears never had humans visit Care-a-Lot until later episodes in the show, and a new villain named Grizzle (who seeks to conquer Care-a-Lot and nothing else) was introduced. A February 2007 article in The Wall Street Journal states that in this version, "they live in a village, centered on a big tree, with no castle in sight".

In mid-2008, 20th Century Fox Home Entertainment released two DVDs, Grizzle-y Adventures and Ups and Downs. These DVDs each contained two special DVD-exclusive episodes, which brought back humans and the Care-O-Meter. The latter also included a passing remark regarding the Forest of Feelings. Care-a-Lot Castle also reappeared in the educational video game Care Bears: Play Day, for the V-Smile Baby.

On July 23, 2008, American Greetings announced that the Care Bears (along with Strawberry Shortcake and Sushi Pack) would be sold to Cookie Jar Entertainment in an acquisition due to take place on September 30, 2008. By April 2009, it was announced that Cookie Jar Entertainment had problems in financing the acquisition and that a French company called MoonScoop has also expressed interest in the franchise. The deadline for Cookie Jar's acquisition was April 30, and MoonScoop's attempt June 7. In mid-August 2009, MoonScoop sued American Greetings, claiming the latter backed out of the planned $95 million-dollar deal; AGC and Cookie Jar sued each other in the process as well. By late April 2010, the Cleveland company "won summary judgement on MoonScoop SAS' contract", as well as "promissory estoppel claims" in the case; MoonScoop filed for an appeal the following month. At the end of November, 2012, the U.S. District Court in Cleveland ruled in favor of American Greetings over MoonScoop.

In late 2009, American Greetings announced that the Care Bears would be reimagined with the launch of a new series, Care Power Team. This series would have the bears sport "enhanced belly badges", and see them taking on emergencies. Although such a series never occurred, the Care Power Team format was used for three new CGI-animated movies – Care Bears: To the Rescue, Care Bears: The Giving Festival, and Care Bears: Share Bear Shines, which were released in 2010 and 2011.

That same year, it was announced that the master rights to the Care Bears toys had changed hands from Play Along Toys to Hasbro.

=== 2012 relaunch ===
In July 2011, American Greetings announced that another brand refresh and a new television series was in development to coincide with the franchise's 30th anniversary, and would be the first to be produced in CGI animation. The central cast of Bears changed again, this time focusing on Tenderheart Bear, Cheer Bear, Share Bear, Grumpy Bear, Funshine Bear, Harmony Bear, and new addition, Wonderheart Bear.

The series was entitled Care Bears: Welcome to Care-a-Lot, which was produced by MoonScoop's U.S. studio and premiered on The Hub on June 2, 2012.

In December 2013, AG Properties and Mindworks Entertainment announced that they would collaborate with Japanese toy and licensing design company Sanrio for a co-branding with their character franchise Little Twin Stars. An expanded roll-out was expected in March 2014.

In July 2014, it was announced that Hasbro lost the rights to the toys to another toy company, Just Play.

In October 2014, when The Hub rebranded to Discovery Family, Welcome to Care-A-Lot was cancelled.

After The Hub cancelled Welcome to Care-a-Lot, on January 15, 2015, Netflix commissioned a new TV series called Care Bears & Cousins. This series was basically a continuation of Welcome to Care-a-Lot, but with the reintroduction of four of the Care Bear Cousins – Brave Heart Lion, Lotsa Heart Elephant, Cozy Heart Penguin and Bright Heart Raccoon. The series was expected to premiere in 2016, but the release was pushed forward to November 2015 when it premiered with six episodes. It was followed by another six episodes. As with Welcome to Care-a-Lot, then-renamed Splash Entertainment did the animation for this series.

In 2017, the franchise celebrated its 35th anniversary.

=== 2019 relaunch ===
In May 2018, an advertisement showcased at the Licensing Expo (a licensing trade show) showcased new redesigns of the Care Bears. Eventually, this was confirmed by the then-rebranded Cloudco Entertainment in September 2018, when they announced they would be making a new television series, titled Care Bears: Unlock the Magic. For the first time in a Care Bears series, the setting is set outside of Care-a-Lot in a mysterious world known as the Silver Lining, populated by creatures known as the Whiffles. The main five Bears for this incarnation are Grumpy, Cheer, Share, Funshine and Good Luck, with the series also featuring the main Whiffle character known as Dibble, serving as "the team's newest pet and companion".

The series premiered on the Boomerang premium streaming service on February 1, 2019; however, the first episode was released on January 28, 2019. The series order included 48 11-minute regular episodes, two 22-minute specials and 20 shorts.

For the 2019 International Day of the Girl, humanitarian organization CARE had celebrities design one-of-a-kind Care Bears and place them up for auction to benefit the charity. Sophia Bush based Justice Bear on Ruth Bader Ginsburg.

In 2020, Basic Fun released a new Care Bears line of toys in the United States, the United Kingdom, Australia and Canada. In 2024, Basic Fun filed for Chapter 11 bankruptcy protection. The company will use bankruptcy proceedings to repay its creditors while remaining in operation.

In 2022, the franchise celebrated its 40th anniversary.

On October 16, 2024, WildBrain announced the production of The Care Berry Switch, a forty-four minute special that crosses over with Strawberry Shortcake.

On June 5, 2025, it was announced that a live-action/animated film based on the franchise was put into development at Warner Bros. Pictures, with Josh Greenbaum being announced as director.

== Characters ==
The franchise consists mainly of the Care Bears themselves, as well as the later additions the Care Bear Cousins. Both of these groups live in the Kingdom of Caring, which is made up of Care-a-Lot (the home of the Care Bears proper) and the Forest of Feelings (the home of the Care Bear Cousins). In 1989, Carole Ashkinaze of The Atlanta Journal-Constitution referred to them as "the whimsical, late 20th-century descendents [sic] of what we used to know as guardian angels: furry, friendly, adorable creatures whose mission is to guide small children and protect them from bogeymen".

Accompanying them are the Star and Heart Buddies, who look out for the Bears and Cousins whenever they are on missions of caring; and the Birds, who are usually seen in the Forest of Feelings with the Care Bear Cousins and who watch over them. A less recurring character is The Cloud Keeper, the portly gentleman who maintains Care-a-Lot.

The 10 original Care Bears consist of Bedtime Bear, Birthday Bear, Cheer Bear, Friend Bear, Funshine Bear, Good Luck Bear, Grumpy Bear, Love-a-Lot Bear, Tenderheart Bear, and Wish Bear. Later on, additional bears joined them, as well as the Cousins.

For the 2007 TV series, Care Bears: Adventures in Care-a-Lot, five of the Care Bears were chosen to be the main characters of the TV series: Share Bear, Cheer Bear, Funshine Bear, Grumpy Bear, and Oopsy Bear, a Care Bear who would frequently make a mess of things. However, the other Care Bears still made appearances in the series. The unofficial role of leader of the bears in this version was transferred from Tenderheart Bear to Cheer Bear. The Cousins were not relaunched in the 2007 series.

Some elements of the Care Bears franchise pay homage to the legend of King Arthur. For example, the name of the main characters' residence, Care-a-Lot, is a play on King Arthur's legendary Camelot castle. The Care Bear Family sits around a heart-shaped table, similar to the Round Table used by Arthur and his knights. In addition, Sir Lancelot's name inspired that of Love-a-Lot Bear.

Throughout the films and various TV series, various villains have tried to stop the Bears and Cousins in the background on their missions and rid the world of the love and caring the Care Bears and the Cousins use. In the two TV specials and DIC TV series, they battled against Professor Coldheart, his assistant Frostbite, and occasionally, Auntie Freeze; in Nelvana's version, they faced the wizard No Heart, his bumbling assistant Beastly, and his ill-tempered niece Shreeky, and minor villains such as Dr. Fright and Sour Sam. In the films, they went up against Nicholas and the Evil Spirit in The Care Bears Movie, Dark Heart in Care Bears Movie II: A New Generation, The Wizard of Wonderland and his assistants Dim and Dum in The Care Bears Adventure in Wonderland, and the Rat King and the Evil Vizier in Care Bears Nutcracker Suite.

Following the 2002 revival, Sir Funnybone the rat was introduced as a villain in the film Care Bears Journey to Joke-a-lot, while The Care Bears' Big Wish Movie broke from tradition in that it did not have a villain. For the 2007 revival, the new film Care Bears: Oopsy Does It! introduced new villain, Grizzle without WingNut (it is friend of the Care Bears), who also appeared in the TV series, Care Bears: Adventures in Care-a-lot. For the 2012 revival, the new series Care Bears: Welcome to Care-a-Lot they went up against a resident King Beastly and his minions Beasties, and additional Care Bears include Wonderheart Bear and Great Giving Bear. Following the 2019 revival, the new series Care Bears: Unlock the Magic they went up against Bluster the leader of the Bad Crowd and her assistant Robbie.

=== The Care Bears' Powers ===
The Care Bears' ultimate weapon is the "Care Bear Stare", in which the collected Bears stand together and radiate light from their respective tummy symbols. These combine to form a ray of love and good cheer which can bring care and joy into the target's heart, break dark spells, or revive something that has been broken, wilted, or messed up. The Care Bear Stare has several different looks. One has a beam coming from the tummy being made up of several replicated images of the symbol. Another variation forms a rainbow when multiple Care Bears and/or Care Bear Cousins are involved. A yellow beam with red hearts is sometimes seen as well. The films Care Bears: Journey to Joke-a-lot and The Care Bears' Big Wish Movie do not feature the Care Bear Stare, but it does return in Care Bears: Oopsy Does It!. In the new TV series, Care Bears Adventures in Care-a-lot, the Care Bear Stare appears as a beam of light in the color of the bear from which it originates.

In the original animated specials and the DIC TV series, the Care Bear Stare is initiated by the phrase "Care Bears...prepare to stare!" while in the Nelvana series and later versions it is initiated by the phrase "Care Bears Countdown!"

The Care Bear Cousins have their own variant of the Stare called the Care Cousin Call. In the DIC series, the Call looks identical to the Stare in appearance. In The Care Bears Movie, the Cousins made whatever animal noise according to their species due to not possessing any tummy symbols; those were given to them by Tenderheart at the end of the movie. In Care Bears Movie II: A New Generation, the Call has the effect of a multicolored musical score. By the Nelvana series, the Call was no longer referred to and the cousins simply performed the Care Bear Stare.

Although commonly used on villains, the stare and call also have been used on humans and the Care Bears themselves. It was occasionally used in the DIC TV series to cure Care Bears and humans who were under the effects of Professor Coldheart's uncaring magic. It also occurred once in Care Bears: Adventures in Care-a-Lot, when it was used to temporarily cheer up Grumpy Bear in the episode "Tell-Tale Tummy".

In addition to the Care Bear Stare, the Care Bears also can use their tummy symbols to summon other assistance, such as heart-shaped balloons, cloud cars, rainbow bridges, and sending out a distress signal.

Usually, a tummy symbol's power is initiated by will, but in Care Bears: Adventures in Care-a-Lot, a Care Bear has to rub its tummy to activate it. By Welcome to Care-a-lot, the belly badges activate by will once again, though the bears may rub their belly to activate it on occasion.

== List of relaunches ==
Franchise iteration	Description	Notes	First appearance
1982 launch / Generation 1	The original Kenner toys, TV specials, movies and animated series, featuring vintage artwork and whimsical fantasy settings; defined much of Care Bears lore.		Greeting cards (1980s), TV specials: The Care Bears in the Land Without Feelings (1983) and The Care Bears Battle the Freeze Machine (1984), movies: The Care Bears Movie (1985), Care Bears Movie II: A New Generation (1986) and The Care Bears Adventure in Wonderland (1987), and animated TV series: "Camp/The Birthday" (Care Bears) and "Care-A-Lot's Birthday" (The Care Bears Family)
1991 relaunch / Generation 2	Short-lived reboot with a more modernized '90s look; less remembered compared to other franchise iterations.		Kenner plush with vivid colours and more detailed tummy symbols
2002 relaunch / Generation 3	Major revival with CGI animation and a heavier focus on teamwork and belly badge abilities.		Movies: Care Bears: Journey to Joke-a-lot (2004) and The Care Bears' Big Wish Movie (2005)
2007 relaunch / Generation 4	Full redesign with a new art style and continuity.		Movies: Care Bears: Oopsy Does It! (2007) and TV: "A Little Help/Tell-Tale Tummy" (Care Bears: Adventures in Care-a-Lot)
2012 relaunch / Generation 5	Modernized designs; first CGI TV series.		TV: "Compassion – NOT" (Care Bears: Welcome to Care-a-Lot) and "Take Heart" (Care Bears and Cousins)
2019 relaunch / Generation 6	"Unlock the Magic", introducing new world-building and adventure-focused storytelling.		TV: "The Beginning" (Care Bears: Unlock the Magic)

== Merchandise ==
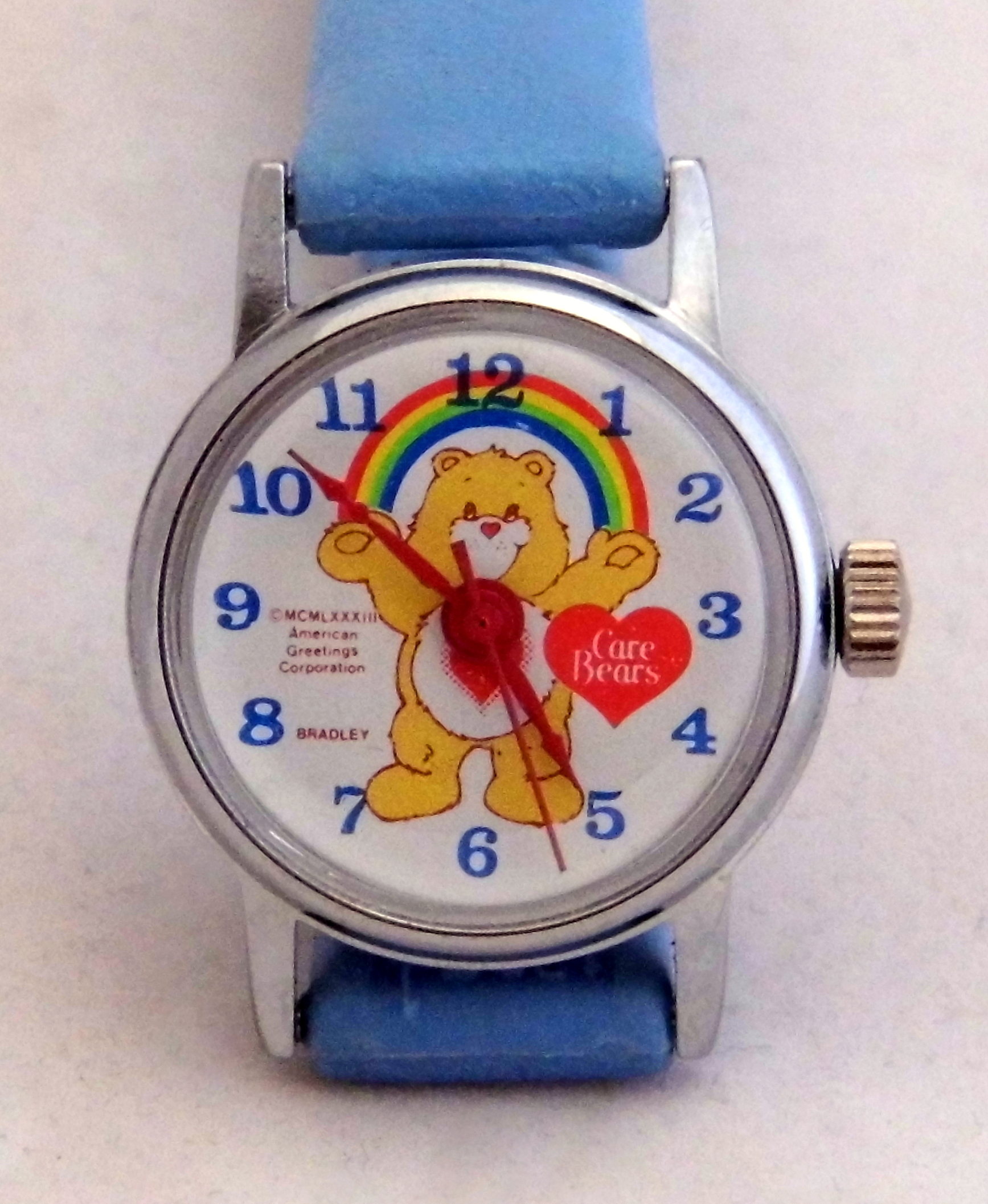
Care Bear watch

Apart from toys, books, greeting cards, and animated media, the Care Bears have been prominently featured in merchandising as well, some of which include decorated lunchboxes, party goods, iron-on patches, bags, stationery, interior decoration sets, bedding, school supplies, keychains, clothing, umbrellas, accessories and many other goods. During the early 2000s relaunch, the classic Care Bear toys were available at stores such as Carlton Cards, Claire's, and Spencer Gifts.

When the franchise was introduced in the 1980s, an error occurred during the manufacturing process of the stuffed animals causing Bedtime Bear (blue) and Wish Bear (aqua) to swap colors. As soon as the mistake was discovered, the two Care Bears returned to their appropriate colors. Later, a children's story was written explaining why the bears had switched colors.

In his 1986 essay, The Shortcake Strategy, Tom Englehardt referred to the Care Bears dolls as "highly specialized" toys. "So specialized [are they] that instead of being complex individual personalities, they are no more than carefully labeled fragments of a personality", he stated. "Together, they must engage in a series of specialized interventions as complex as those of any real-life medical unit."

== Books ==
Many children's books have been based on, and featured, the Care Bears and Care Bear Cousins. Some early publications include Meet the Care Bear Cousins (featuring stills from the first movie), Sweet Dreams for Sally, The Witch Down the Street, The Trouble with Timothy, and A Sister for Sam. All of these titles were published by Parker Brothers, who was a licensee of the characters. Over 45 million Care Bears books were sold during the 1980s. In 2006, Scholastic Press published books based on the Bears' first two CGI films, as well as the new toys, while Modern Publishing published a small number of activity and baby books featuring the Bears for the infant and toddler market. Publications International and Penny Candy Press also are known to have published a few sound books featuring the Bears in the past.

In Playing by Different Rules, a 1988 book chronicling the Parker Brothers/General Mills merger, Ellen Wojahn wrote that Parker's Care Bears books (along with those based on sister property Strawberry Shortcake) "were, in fact, little more than illustrated brochures for Kenner's projects—and who knew [by 1984] how long the likes of these characters would remain popular?"

== Comics ==
Between November 1985 and January 1989, the Care Bears appeared in a 20-issue comic book series published under Marvel's Star Comics imprint and featured art by Howard Post. Issue #13 (from November 13, 1986) featured a crossover with another American Greetings property, Madballs.

During the same period, in the United Kingdom, the Care Bears also appeared in a comic book series published by Marvel UK with artwork by Mario Capaldi. These periodic comics were later bundled into hardback annual books. Some of these UK comic book issues also featured stories and art from the U.S. comic series.

A comic book based on Care Bears: Unlock the Magic was announced by IDW Publishing in March 2019. It was released in July that year.

== Music ==
During the 1980s, Kid Stuff Records released several vinyl LPs based on the franchise. Introducing the Care Bears was released in 1982. In 1983, four more LPs were also released: The Care Bears Care for You, Adventures in Care-a-Lot, The Care Bears Off To See The World and The Care Bears' Christmas. The Care Bears' Birthday Party was released the following year in 1984. In 1986, Friends Make Everything Better was released as a promotion with Triaminic cough medicine. They also released the soundtrack albums for the first films. The albums based on the toys were bestsellers in children's music during this time.

All of the albums from 1982 and 1983 featured writing, production, and performance credits from Mark Volman and Howard Kaylan. The soundtrack album from The Care Bears Movie featured songs by Carole King and John Sebastian.

During the 2002 revival, Madacy Kids released Care Bears CDs. In 2004, Meet the Care Bears, Care Bears Holiday Hugs, Care Bears Christmas Eve, and the Care Bears: Journey to Joke-a-Lot soundtrack album were released. In 2005, Care Bears Nighty-Night was released. Music students at Roger Williams University were invited to submit to the soundtrack, but such submissions ultimately were not included.

== Video games ==
A Care Bears video game was planned for the Atari 2600 in 1983. Preliminary production was completed and ready for beta testing, but the project was cancelled before testing could begin – largely due to uninteresting gameplay and the diminishing video game market, which resulted in the video game crash of 1983. The beta prototype subsequently faded into obscurity and the only known existing prototype to date is an early alpha of the video game. No other video games featuring the Care Bears were made during this period.

In 2004, the Care Bears starred in their first official game, Care-a-Lot Jamboree, for the PC. A few months later, another PC game featuring the Care Bears, Let's Have a Ball! was released. That same year, they were featured in Care Bears A Lesson in Caring for the V.Smile educational game console.

In 2005, they appeared in Catch a Star (also for the PC) and Care Bears: Care Quest (for the Game Boy Advance).

In August, 2008 a new game, Care Bears Play Day, was released for the V.Smile Baby Infant Development System.

An interactive toy, Care Bears Share-a-Story, was introduced by Play Along in July 2005. Based upon a concept similar to Worlds of Wonder's Teddy Ruxpin and The Talking Mother Goose, and Playmates Toys' Cricket dolls, the Care Bear's head, mouth and eyes move around as a cartridge plays fairy tales, such as Goldilocks and the Three Bears, Jack and the Beanstalk, and The Three Little Pigs. A hardback book version of the story accompanied it so that the parent and child could read along as the story played. The toy shipped with the story, Goldilocks and the Three Bears, while additional story cartridges and books could be purchased separately.

Care Bears Sing-Along pals also were introduced. These Care Bears toys sing three different songs while their heads rock back and forth and can synchronize wirelessly with other singing Care Bears of the series to sing together in a group. These toys were initially introduced in a rather large variety of designs, and Share Bear, Cheer Bear, and Funshine Bear models were produced during the 2007 relaunch.

== See also ==
- Berenstain Bears
- Holly Hobbie (character)
- My Little Pony
- Paw Paw Bears
- Popples
- Pound Puppies
- Rainbow Brite
- Strawberry Shortcake
- The Get Along Gang
- The Wuzzles
- Ziggy (comic strip)
