= The Care Bears in the Land Without Feelings =

- Written by: Ken Sobol
- Directed by: Pino van Lamsweerde
- Starring: Rick Jones; Les Lye; Anna MacCormack; Abby Hagyard
- Theme music composer: Robert Chimbel; Merry Loomis
- Country of origin: Canada
- Original language: English

Production
- Producers: Those Characters from Cleveland, LLC; W.H. Stevens; Hugh Campbell
- Cinematography: Ron Haines; Jan Topper
- Editors: Jennifer Irwin; Norman LeBlanc; Gerald Tripp
- Running time: 23 minutes
- Production company: Atkinson Film-Arts

Original release
- Network: Syndication
- Release: April 22, 1983

Related
- The Care Bears Battle the Freeze Machine

The Care Bears in the Land Without Feelings is the first animated television special to feature the Care Bears characters. It was made by Ottawa's Atkinson Film-Arts studio, and premiered in syndication on April 22, 1983. The special features the ten original Bears, along with the Cloud-Keeper and the villain Professor Coldheart; they would return in 1984's The Care Bears Battle the Freeze Machine.

== Plot ==
Kevin, a boy on Earth, is upset because he has to move away from his younger friend Donna. After declaring that he does not care, he decides to run away and ends up in The Land Without Feelings, which is ruled by the misanthropic and winter-centric mad scientist Professor Coldheart. He turns Kevin into a green amphibian-like goblin via a soda-like potion and declares him a slave. The Care Bears, along with Donna, go into the Land Without Feelings to save Kevin and the other children Coldheart transformed. Tenderheart Bear attempts to climb up to Coldheart's castle, but is caught in a trap by Coldheart himself. Wish Bear makes a wish to be teleported to Coldheart's castle with Grumpy Bear and Donna, along with the other Care Bears. The Care Bears use their magic 'Care Bear Stare' to change Kevin and the other children back to normal, and Coldheart flees.

== Cast ==
- Anna MacCormack as Grumpy Bear, Funshine Bear, Cheer Bear and Bedtime Bear
- Rick Jones as Tenderheart Bear, Good Luck Bear and Birthday Bear
- Abby Hagyard as Friend Bear, Wish Bear and Love-A-Lot Bear
- Les Lye as Professor Coldheart, Tree and Rock
- Justin Cammy as Kevin
- Andrea Blake as Donna
- Kathy MacLellan as Fountain and Flowers
- John Tarzwell as the Cloudkeeper

== Songs ==
- The Care Bears Care About You
- Professor Coldheart
- Everyone Has Feelings

== Release ==
The Care Bears in the Land Without Feelings won a Silver Medal at the 1983 International Film & TV Festival of New York. It was followed by another syndicated special, The Care Bears Battle the Freeze Machine, in 1984. Author Ward Johnson loosely adapted The Land Without Feelings into a book in the Tales from the Care Bears series, entitled Caring is What Counts (ISBN 0-910313-05-9), with illustrations by Tom Cooke.

Family Home Entertainment released the special on VHS through MGM/UA Home Video after its initial broadcast. Original prints featured vintage cartoons from the 1930s after the main presentation; a later re-issue replaced those with several other Care Bear stories.

In honour of the Care Bears' 25th anniversary, it received its DVD premiere in fall 2007. Additionally, the version featured on this DVD is not the rare original version, but the more common one seen as part of the later syndicated run of the regular DIC and Nelvana series (which was also seen on the Disney Channel and, later, Toon Disney).

This was released on the UK Volume 1, along with The Care Bears Battle the Freeze Machine, and the three episodes The Birthday/Camp, Braces/Split Decision, and The Last Laugh by Maximum Entertainment.

In May 1985, Ralph Novak of People Weekly wrote that the special "is a charming way for children waiting for the video version of The Care Bears Movie to pass the time".
