= Care Bears: Journey to Joke-a-lot =

- DVD cover
- Directed by: Mike Fallows
- Written by: Jeffrey Alan Schechter
- Produced by: Cynthia Taylor
- Starring: Julie Lemieux; Allie Cannito; Adrian Truss; Susan Roman; Katie Griffin
- Edited by: Annellie Samuel
- Music by: Ian Thomas
- Production companies: Nelvana Limited (Note: Animation outsourced to Sparx Animation Studios and Crest Animation Productions); Those Characters from Cleveland
- Distributed by: North America: Lions Gate Home Entertainment (Family Home Entertainment); Overseas: Universal Pictures Video
- Release dates: September 8, 2004 (TIFF); October 5, 2004 (North America); December 12, 2004 (Disney Channel)
- Running time: 83 minutes
- Countries: Canada; United States
- Language: English
- Budget: US$3–5 million

Care Bears: Journey to Joke-a-lot is a 2004 animated musical adventure film, produced by Nelvana Limited and released by Lions Gate Home Entertainment. It was the first Nelvana Limited co-production featuring the Care Bears in the last 24 years, since the Care Bears Nutcracker Suite television film in 1988. Directed by Mike Fallows and written by Jeffrey Alan Schecter, this was the fourth film to star the Care Bears and their first in 17 years. This was also the first one in the franchise to be computer-animated.

The film centres on Funshine Bear, a Care Bear who loves to laugh and tell jokes. After one of his jokes backfires against Grumpy, another of the Bears, Funshine runs away to find a place where others can appreciate his talents better. He discovers a town known as Joke-a-lot, where laughter and humour are the order of the day, and soon becomes the area's "King". Unknown to the Bear, a rat named Sir Funnybone is using him that way in order to possess an important object called the Royal Sceptre.

Journey to Joke-a-lot premiered in the United States on October 5, 2004, direct-to-video through Lions Gate Home Entertainment, and was subsequently released in 2005 in international territories through Universal Pictures Video. It received generally positive reviews, although the computer animation was singled out. In the midst of this installment's success, Lions Gate released a 2005 sequel, The Care Bears' Big Wish Movie. A soundtrack album, featuring the film's songs and some original tracks, was released by Madacy Kids on the same day as the film's debut.

== Plot ==
The Care Bears live in a cloud-filled land known as Care-a-lot ("With All Your Heart"). One of the Bears, Grumpy, is working on a rainbow carousel for the upcoming Care Bear Fair. His fellow Care Bears come by for a look; one of them, Funshine, loves telling jokes and making the other Care Bears laugh. After they reluctantly agree to try the carousel, it goes out of control and sends them into the sky before crashing down. Grumpy feels even worse after Funshine tries to cheer him up with a joke on height restrictions, which the other Bears find funny. Grumpy is not amused and even goes so far as to tell Funshine that if he doesn't understand that cheering up isn't making fun of, then maybe Funshine doesn't belong in Care-A-Lot. As a result, the Bears force him to make up with Funshine by apologizing. Upon reaching his house, they find no trace of their friend. Reading from a note, Tenderheart Bear realizes that Funshine has felt sorry for Grumpy and has gone in search of a place where his talents can be better appreciated. The other Bears are worried about his fate; as they cannot hold their Fair without him, they decide to look for him regardless and bring him back to Care-a-lot. Five of them— Tenderheart, Grumpy, Wish, Cheer and Share volunteer, while Laugh-a-Lot, Love-a-Lot, Friend, Good Luck, Bedtime, and Champ stay home to get ready for the fair.

The day after he runs away ("Make Em Laugh") from home, Funshine hears circus music in the distance and strays from his camping spot to find out. Taking a seat on a bumper car, he embarks on a long ride which leads him to Joke-a-lot, a town where humour is dominant ("In the Land of Joke-a-Lot"). The area's residents are astonished when he lands via parachute upon the town square; a female piglet called Gig tells him where he now is. Then a rat named Sir Funnybone arrives at the scene and dubs Funshine the area's long-lost King (although Funshine insists otherwise). Funnybone actually placed the car within the woods so that he could begin to gain his own power; he tells that to his henchmen, a trio of houseflies named Phido, Cleon, and Bidel.

Eventually, Funshine learns the hard way that "serious" is a very bad word in Joke-a-lot. The Joke-a-lot residents celebrate a "Laff-Fest" in his honour; Funnybone gives him a tour of the town and takes him to his Royal Palace, where Funshine learns of the last two Kings and is introduced to the Royal Sceptre. Stored in a vault within the voice-activated Royal Treasury, the sceptre holds the Royal Jewels of Joke-a-lot, which Funnybone says are "the source of the magic power behind all the fun" there; only the king is granted access. Funshine wants to look, but Funnybone tells him that a coronation is about to take place. He plans to take command of the sceptre, now in the hands of a slow, elderly alligator called Grand Duke Giggle.

At the coronation, Joke-a-lot's new "king" tells his audience two jokes to pass the time, before Grand Duke Giggle proceeds to give him the sceptre. Meanwhile, the other Care Bears find his belongings and take the same ride that he did. After they crash into the Royal Palace, Funshine is delighted to see them, but the Bears are a bit puzzled over what he has become. They miss Funshine and want him to return home to Care-a-lot where he belongs. Even Grumpy apologizes for his earlier harsh words towards him. Thus, he must make a very difficult decision—to head back home with them, or remain King of Joke-a-lot ("Here I'm a King" cut short due to Funshine having a near-death freak accident) and no longer live with his fellow Care Bears. After a Hanna-Barbera-styled chain reaction that caused him to slip on a banana peel and getting wrapped around in a carpet, bang around the statues like a pinball, through a hallway, crash into a clown-face laundry shoot, travel through a colorful tunnel where he screams for dear life, into a bakery where he lands on a cake that is being prepared, where a bunch of weasels laugh at him, and reuniting with the Care Bears. He announces that he will go home, but Sir Funnybone wants him to stay as king.

During the "Laff-Fest", Giggle gives the sceptre to the new king. Funnybone orders Phido, Cleon, and Bidel to steal it when Funshine is not looking. He gets into the Treasury with it, unlocks the Royal Jewels, (But not before getting beat up by a bunch of giant boxing gloves), and escapes with this loot on a pink dirigible. As Grumpy is fixing his carousel, the other Bears must use it to stop Funnybone. The machine spins onto the dirigible, bursting the balloon and sending it aground.

When the Care Bears come to Funnybone, he reveals his real name and homeland—Basil Ratbone, from the No Fun Atoll, whose inhabitants have lived through a "serious" modus operandi. He wanted the jewels so much to enliven his fellow residents that he planned on stealing them from Joke-a-lot, and even pretended that Funshine's "tummy symbol" was the royal birthmark. Instead, the real one—a "smiley mouth"—was at the back of Gig's ears. The other Bears open the chest to find a jack-in-the-box, and other toys, which Funshine assures them are the real magic jewels. Funnybone apologizes for his misdeeds, and soon all of Joke-a-lot attends a coronation in which Gig becomes their Princess (though she is really more like a Queen). The Bears promise to return to Joke-a-lot some other day and ride home to Care-a-lot on the flying horses from their carousel thanks to Twinkers.

== Cast ==
- Julie Lemieux as Funshine Bear
- Stevie Vallance as Share Bear
- Andrew Sabiston as Tenderheart Bear
- Sunday Muse as Cheer Bear
- Robert Tinkler as Grumpy Bear
- Sugar Lyn Beard as Wish Bear
- Angela Maiorano as Love-a-lot Bear
- Katie Griffin as Laugh-a-lot Bear
- Catherine Disher as Friend Bear
- Linda Ballantyne as Champ Bear
- Scott McCord as Bedtime Bear-
- Susan Roman as Good Luck Bear
- Adrian Truss as Sir Funnybone
- Alessandra Cannito as Gig
- James Rankin as Grand Duke Giggle
- Jamie Watson as Scribe
- Len Carlson as Philo the Purple Fly
- Neil Crone as Bidel the Green Fly
- Tony Daniels as Cleon the Yellow Fly
- Rick Miller as Kangaroo Guard
- Carolyn Larson as Computer (PAL)
- Richard Binsley as Twinkers

== Production ==
Journey to Joke-a-lot was produced at Toronto's Nelvana studio, and also at Sparx Animation, under the working title The Care Bears in King Funshine the Great. The first in a tentative series, it was self-financed by Nelvana in the US$3–5 million range; a team headed by the studio's executive vice-president, Scott Dyer, oversaw its production. In early 2003, Artisan Entertainment acquired the distribution rights to the film from Nelvana. Glenn Ross, the president of Family Home Entertainment (then owned by Artisan), announced the characters' reinvention and re-introduction to parents and young viewers.

== Release ==
Upon release, Journey to Joke-a-lot was the fourth film to feature the Care Bears, and their first one in over 15 years. (Note: In 1987, the Care Bear characters appeared in The Care Bears Adventure in Wonderland from Cineplex Odeon Films.) It was also the first computer-animated installment in the franchise, and its first feature to go direct-to-video. Backed by an advertising campaign worth more than US$2 million, the film was released in North America by Artisan's successor, Lions Gate, on October 5, 2004; overseas rights were handled by Universal Pictures soon after. In the U.S., the film's release coincided with the second annual National Care Week; it debuted at eighth place on Billboard's VHS sales chart in late October 2004, and sold more than 500,000 copies by April 2005. In January 2005, Journey to Joke-a-lot was a nominee in the "Animated DVD Premiere Movie" category at the fifth annual DVD Exclusive Awards. The film aired on U.S. cable television's Disney Channel in December 2004 and May 2005. In the midst of Joke-a-lot's success, Lions Gate Home Entertainment released another computer-animated film with the Care Bears, Big Wish Movie, on October 18, 2005.

The DVD contains seven deleted scenes: "Laugh If You Want To!", "Caring Is Serious Business", "Which Way to Funshine?", "I Wonder", "Packs-A-Magic!", "Unpacks-A-Magic!" and "The Great Escape!". In his introduction to those scenes, director Mike Fallows says to the audience, "Congratulations on finding your way this far." All of the scenes have partially completed animation except the last one, "The Great Escape!", which has finished animation.

== Reception ==
A writer for the Video Business magazine said of Journey to Joke-a-lot: "While [it] ain't no Shrek—the gold standard—the movie is still amusing enough to charm the target demographic of ages 2–5 and should do well with parents looking for harmless kiddie fare." Bruce Kluger of Parenting commented likewise: "The computer animation might not be as quaint as the pen-and-ink of the 1980s version, but the new songs and brisk pace make this one a keeper for a new generation." In July 2005, Rob Lowing of Sydney, Australia's The Sun-Herald gave it three stars out of five, and wrote: "Adults will find this computer-generated cartoon as sickly sweet as fairy floss but tiny tots will love the colourful blobs—oops, we mean the Care Bears. [...] Support characters that look like toys, four bright songs and lots of giggling will score with the under-fives." Saskatchewan's The Star Phoenix also praised the film and its soundtrack, adding that "Even the movie is "bear"-able for grown-ups with subtle adult humour woven into the silliness." However, MaryAnn Johanson of the Flick Filosopher called it a "horrifying attempt at children's entertainment", adding that "The cold CGI animation removes any vestige of coziness that might have been found in what is essentially a giant advertisement for itself." She referred to the title setting, Joke-a-lot, as "a sort of Oz-meets-Candyland with just a soupcon of pastel near-oddity Tim Burton might have pondered in a moment of sentimental weakness".

== Music ==
Care Bears: Journey to Joke-a-lot

Soundtrack album by Various artists
- Released: October 5, 2004
- Label: Madacy Kids

The music for Journey to Joke-a-lot was composed and produced by Canadian musician Ian Thomas; Jane Siberry wrote and performed the opening track, "With All Your Heart". A soundtrack album released by Madacy Entertainment's Madacy Kids label features 13 tracks, five of which were featured in the film: "With All Your Heart", "Make 'Em Laugh", "In the Land of Joke-a-lot", "Here I Am a King" and "I Like My Friends a Lot". Some weeks after the release of Joke-a-lot, Siberry performed "With All Your Heart" at the Alix Goolden Hall in Victoria, British Columbia; Adrian Chamberlain of that province's Times Colonist wrote that "[she] performed [the song] with absolute sincerity, even the jaunty refrain which is whistled. Only an artist like this—so intensely focused, so innately talented—could deliver such a diversity of elements in a potent and convincing manner." In 2005, Ian Thomas was nominated for a Gemini Award for Best Original Score for an Animated Program or Series, for his work on the film.

No.	Title	Length
1.	"In the Land of Joke-a-lot"	3:01
2.	"I Like My Friends a Lot"	3:05
3.	"Make 'Em Laugh"	2:38
4.	"Joke-a-lot Tour (Instrumental)"	1:37
5.	"Here I'm a King"	2:51
6.	"When I Get Home"	4:04
7.	"Everyone Loves the Care Bears"	3:01
8.	"You and Me"	3:20
9.	"Me and My Amigo"	3:10
10.	"Seriously"	4:02
11.	"Show That You Care"	3:39
12.	"We Love to Laugh"	3:05
13.	"With All Your Heart"	4:45

== See also ==
- List of American films of 2004
- List of Canadian films of 2004
- List of Nelvana franchises
- List of animated feature-length films
