= The Care Bears Battle the Freeze Machine =

- A poster for the original May 1984 video release of the special
- Written by: Peter Sauder
- Directed by: Pino van Lamsweerde; Paul Schibli (animation)
- Starring: Rick Jones; Bob Dermer; Noreen Young; Les Lye; Abby Hagyard; Dominic Bradford; Brodie Osome
- Narrated by: Bob Dermer
- Theme music composer: Robert Chimbel and Merry Chimbel (songs); Gary Morton (score)
- Country of origin: Canada
- Original language: English

Production
- Producers: W.H. Stevens Jr. Hugh Campbell
- Cinematography: Ron Haines; Jan Topper
- Editors: John Harris; Jennifer Irwin; Norman LeBlanc; Gerald Tripp
- Running time: 30 min.
- Production company: Atkinson Film-Arts

Original release
- Network: Syndication (USA/CAN); Global Television Network (CAN)
- Release: April 6, 1984

Related
- The Care Bears in the Land Without Feelings; Care Bears

The Care Bears Battle the Freeze Machine is the second animated television special to feature the Care Bears characters. It was made by Ottawa's Atkinson Film-Arts studios, distributed by Lexington Broadcast Services Company, and premiered in syndication in April 1984. The special introduces three new Care Bears characters; Grams Bear, Hugs, and Tugs, as well as Professor Coldheart's sidekick, Frostbite.

== Plot ==
Paul, a young boy, vows to get even with his bullies. The mad scientist Professor Coldheart tricks him into fixing his "Careless Ray Contraption" after his henchman Frostbite accidentally breaks it. The Care Bears, led by Tenderheart Bear, set out to stop Coldheart's plan of freezing the town's children using his machine. Hugs and Tugs, two baby Care Bears are kidnapped by Coldheart and trapped in ice. After learning this from their caretaker Grams Bear, the Care Bears must not only stop Coldheart and convince Paul to abandon his desire for revenge but also rescue Hugs and Tugs.

== Overview ==
The special, a follow-up to the previous installment The Land Without Feelings, sees the return of the ten original Bears, the Cloud Keeper, and Professor Coldheart. it introduces Baby Hugs, Baby Tugs, their caretaker Grams Bear, and Professor Coldheart's dwarf sidekick, Frostbite.

== Cast ==
- Les Lye as Professor Coldheart
- Anna MacCormack as Grumpy Bear, Funshine Bear, Cheer Bear, Bedtime Bear, Baby Tugs and Grams Bear
- Noreen Young as Baby Hugs
- Abby Hagyard as Friend Bear, Wish Bear and Love-A-Lot Bear
- Bob Dermer as Frostbite and the Cloudkeeper
- Dominic Bradford as Paul
- Brodie Osome as Lumpy
- Rick Jones as Tenderheart Bear, Birthday Bear and Good Luck Bear

== Release and reception ==
The Care Bears Battle the Freeze Machine was syndicated in both the United States and Canada, and aired on over 100 U.S. television stations, the Global Television Network, and some Canadian stations in April 1984, and was sponsored by Kenner Products, the makers of the franchise. That same year, it won an award for Best Children's Program at the 13th National ACTRA Awards. A tie-in book based on the special (ISBN 0-910313-15-6) was written by Arthur S. Rosenblatt, illustrated by Joe Ewers and published by Parker Brothers as a part of the Tales from the Care Bears series.

The special was released on VHS and Beta by Family Home Entertainment in May 1984. This, and The Land Without Feelings, were among the ten best-selling children's videos on the U.S. market in 1985. It was released for the first time on DVD, as a special feature, on MGM Home Entertainment's 2007 re-issue of The Care Bears Movie. The print featured on the disc is the syndicated edit, not the original broadcast version.

In 1987, Don R. Le Duc referred to Freeze Machine as a "shallow merchandising marvel".

In fall 2008, the special edition of The Care Bears Battle the Freeze Machine has been released on DVD. Additionally, the version featured on this DVD is not the rare original version, but the more common one seen as part of the later syndicated run of the regular DIC and Nelvana series (which was also seen on the Disney Channel and, later, Toon Disney).
