= Care Bears: Oopsy Does It! =

- Theatrical release poster
- Directed by: Davis Doi
- Screenplay by: Jill Gorey; Barbara Herndon; Thomas Hart
- Starring: Scott McNeil; Ashleigh Ball; Tabitha St. Germain; Tracey Moore; Ian James Corlett
- Music by: Carl Johnson
- Production companies: SD Entertainment; American Greetings; The Hatchery
- Distributed by: Kidtoon Films
- Release date: August 4, 2007
- Running time: 71 minutes
- Country: United States
- Language: English

Care Bears: Oopsy Does It! is a 2007 American animated fantasy film released on August 4, 2007 by Kidtoon Films. It was developed by American Greetings as part of the Care Bears' 25th anniversary, and produced by SD Entertainment. Oopsy Does It is the first Care Bears film not to be produced by Nelvana, the Canadian company responsible for the previous feature-length installments and most of the television episodes. The movie was released on DVD on October 23, 2007. This film serves as a pilot episode of Care Bears: Adventures in Care-a-lot.

== Plot ==
Oopsy, Cheer, Funshine, Share, and Grumpy are building WooHoo World, Care-a-lot's amusement park. Everyone has a job on the building of the park and Oopsy's job is painting the tracks of the Funderbolt ride. He had completed one part of the tracks but realized that he was stuck. Suddenly, he slips into the paint and rides down the whole ride by himself. Cheer, Share, Funshine and Oopsy decided to try the Funderbolt ride. After the ride, Oopsy stumbles and makes a chain reaction with plenty of disaster on the way that leaves Grumpy and the others wondering if they can fix Oopsy's disaster in time for the grand opening. Oopsy feels guilty for his actions and he wants to help his friends. Funshine recommends that Oopsy place the placing signs all around Care-a-Lot, this keeps Oopsy from causing any more trouble. Cheer gives Oopsy a special whistle in case he needs her help.

Meanwhile, a mean bear called Grizzle, who doesn't understand the Care Bears and their "caring stuff", has a new plan to conquer Care-a-Lot. He creates a "ride" called the "CareTaker" that steals the Care Bears' belly badges. But he needs three ingredients to make the CareTaker work: a smiling sun (Funshine's symbol), a crying stormcloud (Grumpy's symbol) and a rainbow (Cheer's symbol). He sends out Wingnut on a mission to Care-a-Lot to get the three ingredients. When Wingnut meets Oopsy, they became friends. Wingnut takes Oopsy to Grizzle's lair. Grizzle tells Oopsy that he created a new ride but in order to make it work, Oopsy must gather the sunshine, the stormcloud and the rainbow.

Oopsy and Wingnut return to Care-a-Lot and later come back to Grizzle's lair with the sunshine and the stormcloud but Grizzle isn't happy with the rainbow that's painted on Oopsy's backside and says that they need a "real" rainbow. Oopsy uses the whistle to call Cheer. Grizzle then colors the CareTaker with Cheer's rainbow. Then, he told Cheer to try the CareTaker. Cheer rides the CareTaker and her rainbow symbol disappears. Grizzle falls out of his metallic suit, then he gets angry and gets back in his suit. Then, he locks Oopsy and Cheer into a slammer and he tells them about his plans to take all the belly badges off all the Care Bears and conquer Care-a-Lot, and then leaves.

Oopsy feels bad about the situation, but Cheer cheers him and helps him figure out a solution to save the day. Suddenly, Oopsy sees one of his tools and uses it to open the bars. Then, WooHoo World is opened for business. When Oopsy and Cheer return to Care-a-Lot, they see that Grizzle stole all the Care Bears' belly badges and has stored them a translucent ball. Grizzle announces his intentions to use belly badge magic to conquer Care-a-Lot, but when he tries, the magic doesn't work for him. Oopsy points out that the magic works only for the Care Bears and those who care. Grizzle then tries to use the Funderbolt ride to destroy the belly badges and manages to destroy the ball. All the Care Bears are very upset about the situation. Oopsy urges every Care Bear to hold hands with each other and remember who they are and how much they care. The magic comes back, as well the belly badges to every Care Bear excluding Oopsy, who drew his own. Wingnut decides to stay with the Care Bears and sends Grizzle to his lair. The next day, when WooHoo World is reopened, Grumpy names a newly added part of the Funderbolt: a corkscrew-shaped ride called "Oopsy Loopsy". The film ends with the Care Bears enjoying WooHoo World with WingNut and some ride the FunderBolt.

The end credits show pictures of children showing their Care Bears teddy bears and a dedication to Shelly Spahnie, a worker for American Greetings.

== Cast ==
- Ashleigh Ball - Oopsy Bear
- Mark Oliver - Grizzle
- Tabitha St. Germain - Cheer Bear
- Scott McNeil - Grumpy Bear
- Ian James Corlett - Funshine Bear
- Tracey Moore - Share Bear
- Nathan Wallace - Wingnut
- Samuel Vincent - Amigo Bear / Good Luck Bear
- Richard Ian Cox - Bedtime Bear
- Terri Hawkes - Love-a-Lot Bear
- Andrea Libman - Harmony Bear
- Kelly Sheridan - Surprise Bear
- Matt Hill - Tenderheart Bear
- Louise Vallance - True Heart Bear
- Chiara Zanni - Wish Bear
- Shannon Chan-Kent - Friend Bear

== Release ==
Opening in 140 theaters, Care Bears: Oopsy Does It! was released by Kidtoon Films in the United States on August 4, 2007. 20th Century Fox Home Entertainment released the DVD with a toy on October 23, 2007, then the only-DVD disc on January 13, 2009 two years later. Two tie-in books were published one month before the movie's debut: one featuring the main character, Oopsy Saves the Day by Sonia Sander (ISBN 0-439-02675-X), and another, by Samantha Brooke, based on the film itself (ISBN 0-439-02676-8).

In February 2007, American Greetings initiated a contest that encouraged fans of the Care Bears, old and new, to send in pictures depicting their memories with the toys. The winning entries made an appearance in the film's closing credits.
