= Christine McGlade =

Digital media designer and strategist and former children's television host and actor

- Born: Christine Moya McGlade; August 25, 1963 (age 63); Canada
- Education: OCAD University (BFA, MDes)
- Occupations: digital design strategist; executive; lecturer; producer; director; screenwriter; former TV host and actor
- Years active: 1979—present
- Children: 3

Christine Moya McGlade (born August 25, 1963) is a Canadian digital designer and strategist, executive, and professor, as well as a former television producer and children's television host. She is best known for hosting You Can't Do That on Television.

== Overview ==
McGlade is best known for her long run as host of the internationally popular kids sketch comedy TV program You Can't Do That on Television, which aired on the CTV Television Network in Canada and Nickelodeon in the United States. She was with the show from its very beginning as a local television show on Ottawa, Ontario, television station CJOH-TV in 1979 until partway through the 1986 season. (In 1985 and 1986 Alasdair Gillis was her co-host.) She also served as host for Whatever Turns You On, the short-lived spinoff that aired on CTV in the fall of 1979.

For nine years, McGlade was the Director of Interactive at Ontario's public educational television network, TVOntario. During her tenure there, she was the executive in charge of production for TVO on Transmedia Projects such as Inside Disaster, Chocolocate, and Green Heroes.

She also worked on social issues as Director of Interactive for Canada's largest volunteer network, getinvolved.ca.

McGlade was a senior partner at communications firm Q Media Solutions. She is the founder and senior partner of Analytical Engine Interactive Inc., a service design and digital strategy consultancy and is a lecturer teaching digital strategy, data analytics and visualization at OCAD University and design and communications at Humber College, Centennial College, and Sheridan College.

== TV host and acting ==
=== You Can't Do That on Television ===
McGlade became a cast member on You Can't Do That on Television by "accident", according to fansite YCDTOTV.com. When show creator Roger Price held auditions for the show in the fall of 1978, McGlade went to the auditions only to support a friend. She had no ambitions in acting or show business, but Price insisted that she either audition or leave. McGlade auditioned and was chosen for the show, although her friend was not.

During the live local, hour-long episodes that aired on CJOH in 1979 and 1981, she often introduced the live contest segments and music videos. In later years, after the show was converted into a half-hour program devoted exclusively to comedy, McGlade became the focal point of many of the episodes' story lines.

McGlade also hosted Whatever Turns You On in 1979, which was a half-hour network version of You Can't Do That on Television produced for the full CTV Television Network, without live or local content, and Something Else in 1982 which was a spin-off of You Can't Do That on Television consisting of live local and musical segments that were no longer part of YCDTOTV's format.

McGlade's nickname on the show was "Moose", which was also her nickname in real life. According to McGlade's personal blog, she was given the name by a sixth-grade classmate "based on the fact that I was always the smallest kid in the class. I think [the classmate] may have been referring to the character in the Archie comics, the giant blonde one, called 'Moose'." After she mentioned this to Roger Price, he decided to write it into the show, and thereafter McGlade was known as "Moose" not only to her schoolmates, but to millions of viewers in the U.S., Canada, and around the world. Though she frequently took her fellow cast members gently to task for referring to her by the nickname, and was referred to more often as "Christine" in later years, the nickname's use persisted among the veterans in the cast, most specifically Lisa Ruddy and Les Lye, until almost the end of her tenure.

McGlade's tenure as host continued through "Garbage", the fifth episode of the 1986 season, by which time she was the last of the original cast members, other than Lye (Ruddy had left at the end of 1985). Though, in keeping with YCDTOTV custom, her departure was not overtly acknowledged on camera, some viewers have suggested that her final scene – in which she and her fellow cast members were carted off the set in garbage bags – may be a tongue-in-cheek reference to it. After McGlade's departure, Alasdair Gillis served as the show's primary host through the end of the 1986 season, at which time he left the cast as well.

In all, McGlade was the third longest-serving member of cast, having appeared in 91 episodes of YCDTOTV, and hosting 89 (she made only a brief appearance in 1979's Episode Five, and her 91st appearance was the cameo in "Age"). Among cast members, only Les Lye (all 144 episodes) and Abby Hagyard (113) appeared in more episodes.

=== Later acting career ===
After leaving YCDTOTV, McGlade starred on Turkey Television, a comedy/variety show aired on Nickelodeon which was also created by Price. As well as acting on the show (along with former YCDTOTV castmates Kevin Kubusheskie, Adam Reid and Les Lye), McGlade also served as assistant producer.

In 1983, she hosted Let Me Prove It on the short-lived pay television service, C Channel. The show later aired in reruns on YTV between 1988 and 1991.

While producing Snit Station interstitials at YTV in the early 2000s, she occasionally played the character "The Wart".

== Production and digital career ==
McGlade moved to Toronto at age 21. She earned a Bachelor of Fine Arts and later a Master of Design from OCAD University, where she now also teaches.

From 1992 to 1999, McGlade worked as a producer, director, and writer for adult current affairs programming at TVOntario and its French-language sister station TFO and then was Director of Interactive and Digital Media at the network from 2005 to 2012. From 1999 to 2000, she was producer and director of the CBC Playground block of preschool programming at CBC Television, and then from 2000 to 2003 and developed and produced the Vortex and Snit Station programming blocks at YTV.

She was senior partner at media production company Q Media Solutions from 2012 until 2014. She founded her own digital strategy company, Analytical Engine Interactive Inc., in 2016.

== Family ==
McGlade has three children, including a set of twins.
