= Les Lye =

Canadian actor (1924–2009)

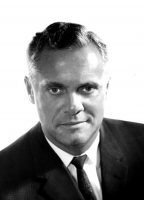
- Born: Leslie Ernest Lye; November 18, 1924; Toronto, Ontario, Canada
- Died: July 21, 2009 (aged 84); Ottawa, Ontario, Canada
- Education: University of Toronto, Lorne Greene Academy of Radio Arts
- Occupations: Actor; comedian; radio personality; writer; voice artist
- Years active: 1948–1994
- Spouse: Jonni Lye (m. 1949)

Leslie Ernest Lye (November 18, 1924 – July 21, 2009) was a Canadian actor, comedian, writer, radio personality and announcer and voice artist. He was an original cast member and played numerous roles on the children's program You Can't Do That on Television. He had a television and radio career spanning over half a century.

== Early life ==
Lye was born in Toronto, Ontario and after high school, served a short stint in the Canadian Armed Forces. He then attended the University of Toronto, earning a Bachelor of Arts degree, and then enrolled in Lorne Greene Academy of Radio Arts.

== Radio career ==
In 1948, he moved to Ottawa, to join Frank Ryan's CFRA talkback team. As a radio announcer, Lye worked with the station's popular groups and was also in demand as an emcee at their many live appearances. After heading back to Toronto to work for a short time at CKEY, he returned to Ottawa and CFRA with his alter ego, Abercrombie. Lye worked with comedian and impersonator Rich Little at the station, and in 1963, they made a comedy album together, My Fellow Canadians, satirizing Canadian political figures of the time.

== Television ==
Lye turned to the new medium of television in 1958. His first job, as a co-host on the talk show Contact, lasted three years.

In 1961, CJOH-TV went on the air with Lye as a freelance writer and performer. Meanwhile, local entertainer Bill Luxton was busy with several shows, including a morning magazine. Forming what would become a long-lasting partnership, Lye soon began creating comic characters for Bill to interview on his morning show.

When puppeteer John Conway decided to give up hosting the CJOH kids show Cartoonerville in 1966, the station's programmers asked Lye and Luxton to team up and take over. Uncle Willy & Floyd was born. Over the years, such personalities as Klea Scott, Bruno Gerussi and Margaret Trudeau would drop by for surprise guest appearances. It ran for 22 years in syndication across Canada, and remains the longest-running Canadian syndicated television show in history.

Lye was a regular character and played multiple roles in the Canadian 1979 sketch comedy TV show Whatever Turns You On, and also appeared in 1983 Nickelodeon production UFO Kidnapped as character Sam Smythe and the Nickelodeon 1985 sketch comedy Turkey Television

In addition to Luxton, Lye worked with Don Harron, Ruth Buzzi and Orson Bean, and worked for the CBC, CTV and Global television networks. Lye is prominently featured in the 2004 independent documentary, You Can't Do That on Film, directed by David Dillehunt.

== You Can't Do That on Television ==
Lye eventually gained international acclaim appearing on You Can't Do That on Television. The Canadian children's show, which was wildly popular in the United States and a staple on Nickelodeon's programming line-up, enjoyed a ten season run from 3 February 1979 to 25 May 1990. Lye, along with Abby Hagyard (who joined the cast in 1982) and Ruth Buzzi, was one of only three adults to ever appear on the show (though Christine McGlade was an adult in her later seasons). As a result, Lye played all the adult male characters, and was the only cast member to appear for the entire series run. His characters included the following:

- Ross Ewich, the show's stage director
- Lance Prevert, a slovenly, drunken, corrupt Canadian senator and father to every kid on the show
- Barth Bagge, Proprietor/Cook for Barth's Burgery, the worst burger joint ever, known for his catchphrase "I... heard that!"
- Blip, a greedy, gap-toothed arcade owner
- Snake Eyes, a reckless school bus driver who often drove his bus into a wall or off a cliff
- Mr. Schidtler, a pompous and sarcastic school teacher with a vague resemblance to Adolf Hitler
- Peter Cockroach, a restaurant critic that critiqued Barth's Burgery
- Unnamed school principal, who frequently imposed copying copious numbers of pages from extra-thick books as punishment for minor infractions
- Nazti, the Dungeon Master, a German jailer who is often seen taunting children chained up in a dungeon next to a skeleton named Hodgkins
- El Capitano, a Latin American military officer in command of a firing squad, who often ends up being shot by his own men while trying to execute one of the kids
- Unnamed doctor, who has the same glasses, mustache, cigar, and wry sense of humor as Groucho Marx
- Unnamed dentist, who replaced the doctor after they ran out of doctor jokes
- Opening and Closing Announcer, "...will not be shown at this time, in its place..."; "You Can't Do That on Television has been a ... production."
- Unnamed school coach, whose various teams never seem to win a game
- Unnamed summer camp counselor who often subjected campers to grueling miles-long hikes and dirty camp chores
- Unfairy Godmother
- Various police officers, cowboys, burglars, etc.

Lye's castmates described him as "a legend", an "unsung hero", and "a hoot even when he wasn't on the set".

== Animation ==
In animation, he guest-starred as Samaritan Sneer on an episode of The Raccoons, "Going It Alone!", and appeared as Professor Coldheart in the first two television specials based on the Care Bears franchise, The Care Bears in the Land Without Feelings and The Care Bears Battle the Freeze Machine. In 1987, he became the voice of Quellor on The Adventures of Teddy Ruxpin. Lye also did several different voices on Dennis the Menace for DiC Entertainment as well as supplying voices on three TV specials for Atkinson Film-Arts: The Legend of Hiawatha, Babar and Father Christmas and Rumpelstiltskin.

== Lifetime achievement ==
In 2003, Lye and Luxton were honored with lifetime achievement awards from the Alliance of Canadian Cinema, Television and Radio Artists (ACTRA), for their work on Willy & Floyd. Lye continued to work as an active member of the Juvenile Diabetes Research Foundation and was writing a book of his memoirs at the time of his death.

In September 2019, the City of Ottawa commemorated Lye in a naming ceremony, which reopened one of the theatres in Centrepointe as the Les Lye Studio Theatre.

== Death ==
Lye died in Ottawa, Ontario, on July 21, 2009, at the age of 84. He had been suffering from type-2 diabetes for a decade, and had suffered a mild heart attack in 2002. He was survived by his wife of 60 years, Jonni Lye, and his three children, Brett, Daralyn, and Emily.
