= CJOH-DT =

Television station in Ottawa

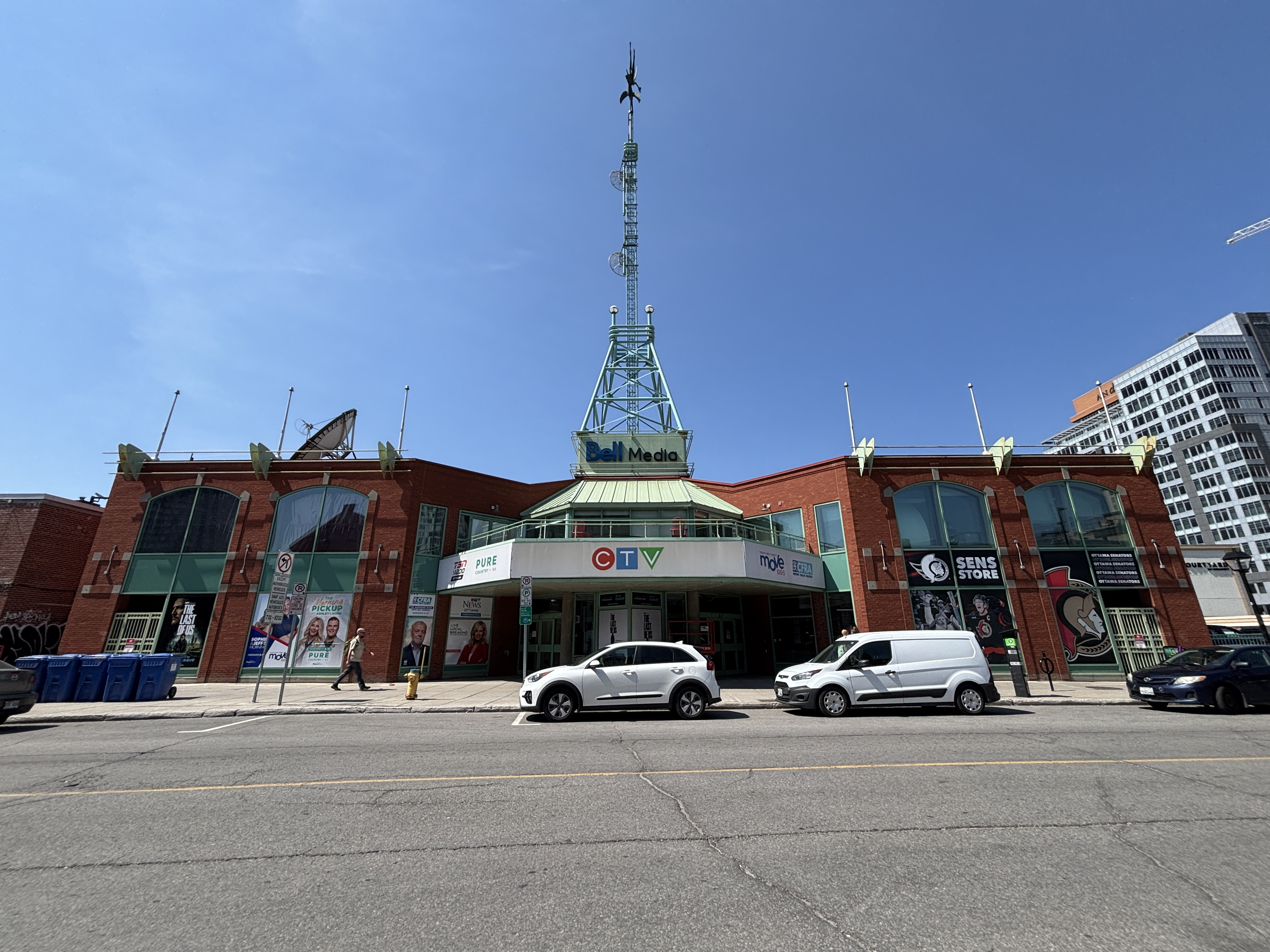
- CTV Ottawa office in ByWard Market
- Ottawa, Ontario; Gatineau, Quebec; Canada
- City: Ottawa, Ontario
- Channels: Digital: 16 (UHF); Virtual: 13
- Branding: CTV Ottawa or CTV (general); CTV News Ottawa (newscasts)

Programming
- Affiliations: CTV

Ownership
- Owner: Bell Media Inc.
- Sister stations: CHRO-TV, CFGO, CFRA, CJMJ-FM, CKKL-FM

History
- First air date: March 12, 1961
- Former call signs: CJOH-TV (1961–2011)
- Former channel numbers: Analog: 13 (VHF, 1961–2011); Digital: 13 (VHF, 2011–2020)
- Former affiliations: Independent (March–September 1961)
- Call sign meaning: CJ Ottawa & Hull, Quebec

Technical information
- Licensing authority: CRTC
- ERP: 54 kW
- HAAT: 423.4 m (1,389 ft)
- Transmitter coordinates: 45°30′11″N 75°51′1″W

Links
- Website: ctvottawa.ca

CJOH-DT (channel 13, cable channel 7) is a television station in Ottawa, Ontario, Canada, owned and operated by the CTV Television Network, a division of Bell Media. It shares studios with Pembroke-licensed CTV2 outlet CHRO-TV (channel 5) and Bell's Ottawa radio properties at the Market Media Mall building on George Street in downtown Ottawa's ByWard Market. CJOH-DT's transmitter is located on the Ryan Tower at Camp Fortune in Chelsea, Quebec, north of Gatineau.

== History ==
CJOH-TV's former Late Nite Movie logo, from 1988

Founded by Ernest L. “Ernie” Bushnell (1900–1987), CJOH signed on for the first time on March 12, 1961. Initially, studio facilities were located at 29 Bayswater Avenue (45.4067°N 75.7204°W) until that September when operations were shifted over several weeks to a $2 million (CA$) complex at 1500 Merivale.

It acquired former Cornwall-based CBC affiliate CJSS-TV as a rebroadcaster in 1963, making CJSS the first television station in Canada to cease operations. The channel 6 transmitter in Deseronto became operational in 1972 to serve the Kingston and Belleville markets. Standard Broadcasting owned the station from 1975 to 1987; that year, after a CRTC decision authorized Baton Broadcasting to launch a new independent station in Ottawa, Standard responded to the potential new competition by selling CJOH to Baton, who then surrendered the new independent licence. Baton was renamed CTV Inc. in 1998 after gaining control of the CTV network the preceding year. CTV in turn would be purchased by Bell Canada and folded into Bell Globemedia, now Bell Media, in 2001.

CJOH's former logo as part of the Baton Broadcast System, c. 1994–1998

CJOH-TV's logo from 1994 with its former slogan "Here for you"

CJOH's former logo (1998–2005). As of October 2005 logos with the stations' callsigns are no longer used on CTV stations; instead they all use the main CTV logo.

On August 1, 1995, the station's longtime sports anchor Brian Smith was shot in the station's parking lot by Jeffrey Arenburg, a released mental patient with a history of threatening media personalities, who claimed the station was broadcasting messages inside his head. Smith died in hospital the following day. The incident led to renewed calls across Canada for strengthening of the Canadian government's gun control legislation and provided the impetus for Brian's Law (Ontario Bill 68) – an amendment of the Mental Health Act and Health Care Consent Act which introduced community treatment orders and new criteria for involuntary commitment to psychiatric facilities. Arenburg was released from a mental hospital in Penetanguishene in 2006, then imprisoned for two years for assaulting a U.S. border guard in 2008.

On August 28, 1996, BBS Ontario Incorporated received CRTC approval to add a new analog transmitter on UHF channel 47 at Pembroke, Ontario, to rebroadcast programming of CJOH-TV. CHRO-TV was also approved to disaffiliate from the CTV Television Network that same day.

The newsroom was destroyed by a four-alarm fire during the early morning hours of February 7, 2010, destroying equipment and the news archives. The building itself remained intact until it was demolished by the end of December 2011. An adjacent office building housing former sister station CKQB-FM was not affected by the fire.

CJOH's news operations were permanently relocated to CTV's ByWard Market building. This would be the first time the ByWard Market studios would have an evening newscast since the cancellation of sister station CHRO-TV's A News in March 2009.

== Programming ==
=== Regular local programming ===
With the exception of networked shows Your Morning (along with its predecessor Canada AM) and Question Period, none of these programs are available in high definition.

- Regional Contact, with Joel Haslam since 1988 and Kathie Donovan from 1998 to 2012, was the second last local program on CJOH besides standard newscasts. The show was a weekly program that previously aired at 6:30 p.m. on Saturdays, but has been moved to Sunday at the same time beginning in September 2011. Episodes produced during or after 2007 are available as streaming media on CJOH's website. The last episode featuring Donovan aired on May 13, 2012. CJOH has since discontinued Regional Contact as a weekly show, but it remains on the station as a weekly segment during the 6 p.m. newscasts.
- Question Period is a national program about Canadian politics produced in Ottawa since 1967. It is the last non-newscast local program on CJOH since the discontinuation of Regional Contact.

=== Former local programming ===
- Bang Bang You're Alive
- Compass
- Vue (where Peter Jennings made his debut)
- Platform
- Dear Charlotte
- Wok with Yan (produced for CBC Television)
- Wayne Rostad Show
- Country Way
- Celebrity Cooks with Bruno Gerussi (produced for CBC Television, later moved to Global)
- Joys of Collecting
- Uncle Chichimus (originally for CBC Television in 1950s; moved to CJOH in 1960s)
- Saturday Date (1961–1969) was a music and dance show targeted at teenagers, with local performances as well as the top songs on Canadian music charts. Peter Jennings was the host of this show until some time in 1962, when he was replaced by John Pozer. Dick Maloney would replace Pozer in 1964. Although the show ended in 1969, Pozer and Maloney would later return on March 13, 1991, for a Saturday Date reunion along with original participants forming the audience.
- Miss Helen (1960s) was a bilingual show designed for pre-sechoolers. It used the Oogly Woogly worm as one of the actors. This format would later be used by its successor Marie-Soleil.
- Strange Paradise (1969–1970; produced for CBC Television)
- The Galloping Gourmet with Graham Kerr (1969–1971; produced for CBC Television)
- The Wonderful World of Kreskin (1970s)
- Mr. Wizard (1971–1972; produced for CBC Television)
- Family Brown Country (1972–1985)
- Morning Magazine (1972–1987; replaced by the national Canada AM) with Bill Luxton and various co-hosts including Margaret Trudeau
- Marie-Soleil (1980s), although the show's host Suzanne Pinel reappears yearly for the CHEO telethon.
- Homegrown Cafe (1980s–1998) was a talent show hosted by J. J. Clarke, who was CJOH's weatherman for the 6 p.m. weekday news until his retirement in 2020.
- Tech Now (2001–2011) was a local technology journalism news program hosted by Paul Brent. It aired from 6:30 p.m. to about 6:55 p.m. on Sundays, and the last episode aired on July 3, 2011. The program's production has been cancelled after Brent retired, with no new episodes or host, although re-runs of older episodes briefly played after the show was discontinued. Eventually, Tech Now ceased to play on CJOH, and was replaced by Regional Contact which previously played on Saturdays during the same time slot.
- Uncle Willy & Floyd (1966–1988) children's comedy with Bill Luxton and Les Lye
- You Can't Do That on Television (1979–1990) with Les Lye and Christine McGlade; children's sketch comedy program which was a locally-oriented show that included contests and live segments in its first two seasons before being picked up by Nickelodeon; a short-lived spinoff, Whatever Turns You On, aired nationally in prime time on CTV in the fall of 1979.
- Something Else (1982) teen-oriented contest and variety show hosted by Christine McGlade with the cast of You Can't Do That on Television

== News operation ==
CJOH-DT presently broadcasts 20 1/2 hours of locally produced newscasts each week (with 3 1/2 hours each weekday and 1 1/2 hours each on Saturdays and Sundays); in lieu of a local morning newscast (which instead airs on sister station CHRO), CJOH displays local news headlines on a news ticker during its broadcast of CTV's semi-national morning program Your Morning (previously Canada AM).

Local newscasts (under the name CTV News) are aired weekdays at noon, 6 p.m. and 11:30 p.m. The newscasts were previously called Midday Newsline/Newsline/Nightline (depending on the time of day) from the 1970s until 1998, and CJOH News from 1998 to 2005. (In 1982, the 6 p.m. newscast Newsline became, for a brief time, Canada's first 90-minute local supper hour newscast.) From December 10, 2011, to autumn 2012, the noon and 6 p.m. broadcasts broadcast for one hour, though the Sunday evening 6 p.m. broadcast remained a half-hour program. Since April 2012, the audio feed of CJOH's 6 p.m. newscast is simulcast on sister radio station CFRA. The Sunday 6 p.m. newscast expanded to one hour in the fall of 2012. On July 7, 2014, the station unveiled a new studio to accompany the transition to high definition news production. On August 28, 2017, CJOH launched a new hour of local news content titled CTV News at 5, part of expanded local newscasts announced in June of that year.

=== Notable former on-air staff ===
- Arisa Cox – reporter
- Harry Elton – anchor (1960s)
- Peter Jennings – anchor
- Max Keeping – 6 p.m. anchor
- Bill Luxton – host of Morning Magazine and various public affairs programs from 1961 to 1988
- Carol Anne Meehan – weeknight anchor
- Graham Richardson – weeknight anchor
- Martin Seemungal – reporter
- Brian Smith – sports anchor
- Carolyn Waldo – sports anchor; weekends

== Technical information ==
=== Subchannel ===
Subchannel of CJOH-DT
Channel	Res.	Short name	Programming
13.1	1080i	CJOH	CTV

==== Analog-to-digital conversion ====
On August 31, 2011, when Canadian television stations in CRTC-designated mandatory markets transitioned from analog to digital broadcasts, the station flash cut its digital signal into operation on VHF channel 13. The station's news operations completed upgrades to high definition capabilities, and the first HD news broadcast took place on July 7, 2014, starting with the noon hour newscast.

=== Spectrum reallocation ===
As part of the CRTC/FCC spectrum reallocation, CJOH-DT was assigned channel 7 as its new frequency, but instead requested channel 16 (which should have gone to Deseronto) for its new frequency. This was given CRTC approval in March 2020. Bell Media was scheduled to carry out the move to channel 16 around July 3, 2020, marking the end of all VHF TV broadcasting in Ottawa.

=== Former rebroadcasters ===
A long list of CTV rebroadcasters nationwide were to shut down on or before August 31, 2009, as part of a political dispute with Canadian authorities on paid fee-for-carriage requirements for cable television operators.

On June 27, 2016, it was announced that Bell Media filed a proposal with the CRTC to shut down 40 of its television transmitters (all rebroadcasters of other stations), due to maintenance costs, high cable and satellite viewership, and no generation of revenue. Among the victims was the former CJSS-TV 8 Cornwall, the first station to rebroadcast CJOH-TV (since 1963).

On July 30, 2019, Bell Media was granted permission to close down CJOH-TV-6 (Deseronto) and CJOH-TV-47 (Pembroke) as part of Broadcasting Decision CRTC 2019-268. CJOH-TV-47 was shut down as of May 2, 2020, and CJOH-TV-6 was shut down on October 9 of the same year.
