= The Adventures of Teddy Ruxpin =

Animated television series

- Genre: Animated series
- Created by: Ken Forsse
- Written by: Mary Crawford; Derek Diorio
- Directed by: Chris Schouten
- Voices of: Phil Baron; Will Ryan; John Stocker; John Koensgen; Robert Bockstael; Les Lye; Abby Hagyard; Pier Kohl; Holly Larocque; Michelle Baron
- Theme music composer: George Wilkins
- Opening theme: "Come Dream with Me Tonight" by Phil Baron
- Ending theme: "Come Dream with Me Tonight" (instrumental)
- Composer: Andrew Huggett
- Countries of origin: Canada; United States
- Original language: English
- No. of seasons: 2
- No. of episodes: 65

Production
- Executive producers: Christopher J. Brough; Alison Clayton; W.H. Stevens Jr.
- Producers: Andy Heyward; Jean Chalopin
- Running time: 22 minutes
- Production companies: Atkinson Film-Arts; DIC Enterprises

Original release
- Network: First run syndication
- Release: December 24, 1986 – October 23, 1987

The Adventures of Teddy Ruxpin is a children's animated series based on Teddy Ruxpin, an electronic children's toy created by Ken Forsse and distributed by toy manufacturer Worlds of Wonder (WoW). Produced in 1986–1987 for television syndication by DIC Enterprises with Atkinson Film-Arts, the series employed many of the same voice actors used in the book-and-tape series that was made for the eponymous animatronic toy. While some of the stories used in the TV series were adapted from the books, many were original and greatly expanded upon the world established there. The series differed from traditional children's animation at the time in that most of its 65 episodes were serialized rather than in traditional episodic form.

In the United States, the series was originally syndicated by LBS Communications. Today, all international distribution rights to the series were previously held by Don Taffner's DLT Entertainment. The series is currently owned by The Jim Henson Company under its HIP (Henson Independent Properties) subsidiary.

== Plot ==
The Adventures of Teddy Ruxpin follows Teddy Ruxpin as he leaves his home on the island of Rillonia with his best friend Grubby to go on a treasure hunting expedition. They follow an ancient map which leads him to find a collection of crystals on the mainland of Grundo. With the help of their new friend Newton Gimmick, an occasionally successful inventor, Teddy and Grubby discover the magical powers of what turns out to be an ancestral treasure as well as an organization with ambitions to use it for evil known as M.A.V.O. (short for Monsters and Villains Organization). Along the way, Teddy learns the long-lost history of his species and clues to the location of his missing father.

== Characters ==
=== Main characters ===
The three main protagonists are often referred to collectively among the fandom as The Trio:

- Teddy Ruxpin (voiced by Phil Baron) is the protagonist of the series. He is a teenage Illiop (roughly 15) whose father disappeared when he was a child. He comes to Grundo to follow a treasure map. Like other Illiops, he is kind and friendly. He loves adventure, meeting new faces, and having new experiences.
- Grubby (voiced by Will Ryan) is Teddy's best friend, who is an Octopede about Teddy's age. Noted for his large appetite, he is fond of cooking and eating root stew and other foods made from roots (which usually do not taste good to non-Octopedes). Though not the bravest or smartest of Teddy's friends, he always sticks by Teddy.
- Newton Gimmick (voiced by John Stocker) is a balding Perloon inventor with a severe stuttering problem and a broad and otherwise questionable definition of "science". Most of his "inventions" either do not work or don't serve any real purpose. Newton is also somewhat absentminded and is usually referred to simply as Gimmick.

=== Allies ===
- Prince Arin (voiced by Robert Bockstael) is the brave Illiper son of the king and queen of Grundo. He lives at Grundo Castle. He first met the heroic trio while searching for his kidnapped sister.
- Princess Aruzia (voiced by Abby Hagyard) is Prince Arin's younger sister who has a sweet demeanor. Though a princess, she does not mind doing work.
- The Wooly Whatsit (voiced by Pier Kohl) is a large furry purple creature who is not very bright, but very helpful and good-hearted. He is later revealed to be a Snowzo, a legendary yeti-like species. He is usually referred to simply as Wooly.
- Leota (voiced by Holly Larocque) is a strict but kind Woodsprite and teacher. Most of her students are elves and woodsprites, but Wooly joined the class as well.
- Louie (voiced by Will Ryan) is a Grunge filmographer.
- Burl Ruxpin (voiced by Phil Baron) is Teddy's long-lost father and Illiop who lost his memory a long time ago and lived as a hermit, but regained his identity toward the end of the series.

=== Villains ===
- M.A.V.O., short for Monsters and Villains Organization, is an organization that terrorizes the land of Grundo.
  - Quellor (voiced by Les Lye) is a Supreme Oppressor of M.A.V.O. and the main antagonist of the series. Quellor is an unspecified creature dressed in dark heavy robes who sees the Illiops as an enemy to his master plan of regaining all six crystals to the one he has in The Black Box. With them, his darkness will reign supremely over the land of Grundo.
    - Sludge is an unspecified blue creature with red hair who is one of Quellor's henchmonsters and a monster in M.A.V.O.
    - Trudge is an unspecified green-gray creature with black spots who is one of Quellor's henchmonsters and a monster in M.A.V.O.
    - Drudge is an unspecified yellow, orange, and blue creature who is one of Quellor's henchmonsters and a monster in M.A.V.O.
    - Dweezil is Quellor's pet rat/bat hybrid that is often used by Quellor to send secret messages.
  - Ickley Bognostroclum (voiced by Pier Kohl) is a troll and the gatekeeper of M.A.V.O. Ickley has the encyclopedic knowledge of all of M.A.V.O.'s rules and laws and is also a good friend of Eleanor Tweeg.
  - Mrs. Maggotheart is an unspecified creature who is the dues collector of M.A.V.O. and makes sure its members pay their dues.
  - Understander of Legends (voiced by John Stocker) is an unspecified creature and a member of M.A.V.O. who serves as the interpreter of the ancient runes.
- Jack W. Tweeg (voiced by John Koensgen) is a troll/Grunge hybrid and an evil wizard-wannabe who thinks he has a recipe to turn buttermilk into gold, is very suspicious, and often spies on Gimmick from his tower. Usually referred to as simply Tweeg, he has desperately wanted to join M.A.V.O. where his plans have often been ridiculed by Quellor.
  - L.B. (short for Lead Bounder) (voiced by Robert Bockstael) is a sarcastic Bounder who usually acts as Tweeg's henchman. L.B. does not show a particularly high degree of loyalty or intelligence, but has enough sense to know that Tweeg's schemes never work. L.B. constantly calls Tweeg by variations of his name, such as "Twix" or "Twizzle", much to Tweeg's annoyance.
- Eleanor Tweeg (voiced by Abby Hagyard) is a troll and the mother of Jack W. Tweeg. She supports his campaign and is good friends with Ickley Bognostroclum.

=== Species ===
The Adventures of Teddy Ruxpin features a large menagerie of sentient species for its character base.

- Illiops are humanoid bear-like creatures, with kind dispositions. They reside in modern Rillonia after a forced mass exodus from ancient Grundo, where they had an advanced civilization.
- Octopedes are yellow caterpillar-like creatures with eight legs & orange spots, each with fully-formed hands. The first pair are employed as hands, while the rest are used for walking. They are often culturally nocturnal, but have no trouble with a diurnal lifestyle.
- Perloons are humans who usually are professional in nature (e.g. scientist, doctor, wizard).
- Illipers are a near-relatives to humans, but broad-faced with flat noses, who live in a medieval-type society with a monarchy. In ancient times, they shared a close association with the civilization of the Illiops.
- Grunges are jungle-dwelling relatives of the Illipers, with antennae in lieu of ears, who tend to be passionate about their hobbies. There are two distinct cultures: the tough and hardy jungle Grunges, and the laid-back, fun-loving, hippie-like surf Grunges.
- Fobs are small, furry, limbless, multicolored penguin-like creatures, sometimes kept as sapient pets.
- Elves are a tiny humanoids with pointy ears and shoes, who share a common culture with the Woodsprites.
- Woodsprites are a tiny humanoids with butterfly-like wings, who share a common culture with the Elves.
- Snowzos are a race of large, white yeti-like creatures who look more dangerous than they are and they prefer very cold temperatures.
- Bounders are a race of red, round, two-legged creatures with a rhinoceros-like horn on top of their heads, usually sarcastic.
- Mudblups are a race of large and lumpy animated blobs of mud, dull-witted and slow-moving but very strong. They are sensitive to bright light, since all of their lives are spent underground.
- Trolls are green, thin creatures with pointed noses. For them, being good means being bad.
- Gutangs are green monkey-like creatures who wear brown tribal armor and are usually belligerent. They are known for attacking in their fixed-wing flying machines.
- Anythings are small, shy creatures able to change into other objects, e.g., carrots, potatoes, other produce. They use their ability to hide. They were previously called Nothings.

== Cast ==
- Phil Baron – Teddy Ruxpin, Burl Ruxpin
- Will Ryan – Grubby, Louie
- John Stocker – Newton Gimmick, Understander of Legends
- John Koensgen – Jack W. Tweeg, the Wizard of Weegee
- Robert Bockstael – L.B., Prince Arin
- Abby Hagyard – Princess Aruzia, Eleanor Tweeg, Eunice
- Pier Kohl – The Wooly Whatsit, Ickley Bognostroclum, Additional Voices
- Holly Larocque – Leota the Woodsprite
- Les Lye – Quellor, Additional Voices
- Heather Esdon – Additional Voices
- Donna Farron – Additional Voices
- Rick Jones – Additional Voices
- Anna MacCormack – Additional Voices
- Doug Stratton – Additional Voices
- Terrence Scammell – Digger, Additional Voices

NOTE: In the tape & book series and the animatronic pilot episode, Tony Pope voiced Gimmick, Will Ryan also voiced Tweeg, Prince Arin, and Wooly, Katie Leigh voiced Princess Aruzia, and Russi Taylor voiced Leota.

== The Seven Crystals of Grundo ==
- The First Crystal (Imagination) – Shrink and Grow
- The Second Crystal (Honesty) – Duplication
- The Third Crystal (Bravery) – Invisibility
- The Fourth Crystal (Trust) – Oxygen Generator
- The Fifth Crystal (Friendship) – Speed Altering
- The Sixth Crystal (Freedom) – Flight Ability
- The Seventh Crystal (The Black Box) – Restore and Erase Memory

== Episodes ==
=== Overview ===
Although The Adventures of Teddy Ruxpin is mostly serialized, it is further broken down into weekly story arcs which involve visiting a different part of Grundo or exploring a major plot thread, often ending in cliffhangers. Some storylines were taken directly from the toy's book & tape story sets, with secondary plots added to increase the running time.

=== Protect Yourself ===
Due to the partnership between Worlds of Wonder and the National Center for Missing & Exploited Children, when The Adventures of Teddy Ruxpin was originally syndicated, each episode included a short segment called "Protect Yourself", which ran after a teaser for the next episode and prior to the closing credits. It featured an animated Teddy Ruxpin on a live-action set, who would introduce contemporary child stars such as Jason Bateman, Brice Beckham, Tiffany Brissette, Shannen Doherty, Corey Feldman and Shalane McCall. The guest would then give young viewers advice on topics such as avoiding strangers, what to do in an emergency, how to respond to inappropriate touching, or running away. A common theme was to talk to a trusted grown-up for help.

=== Season 1 (1986–87) ===
No.	Title	Original release date
1	"The Treasure of Grundo"	December 24, 1986
Teddy and Grubby meet Newton Gimmick, and the three search for the Treasure, while Tweeg and L.B. plot to lead them off course so they can find it first.
2	"Beware of the Mudblups"	December 25, 1986
Teddy, Grubby and Gimmick are captured by Mudblups and put in jail. They meet Prince Arin and escape when the light scares the Mudblups.
3	"The Guests of the Grunges"	December 26, 1986
Teddy, Grubby, Gimmick and Prince Arin go to The Jungle with No Name to collect water and meet the Wooly What's-It. They then meet the Grunges and are invited to their feast. Later, during the song, Prince Arin falls into the soup and becomes an uncontrollable Iron Warrior due to too much vitamin Z in the soup. He and Wooly fight until they fall off a cliff and into a pool below, causing Prince Arin to return to normal.
4	"The Fortress of the Wizard"	December 27, 1986
Teddy, Grubby, Gimmick, Prince Arin and the Wooly Whatsit meet a wizard, who tells them that the princess was taken to the Hard To Find City. Together, the group plans to rescue her.
5	"Escape from the Treacherous Mountain"	December 28, 1986
Teddy, Grubby, Gimmick, Prince Arin and the Princess plot to escape from the Hard To Find City and the Gutang warriors, while finding the Treasure of Grundo.
6	"Take a Good Look"	December 31, 1986
Teddy, Grubby and Gimmick are shrunk to the size of insects and explore Gimmick's house while Fuzz is chasing them.
7	"Grubby's Romance"	January 1, 1987
Teddy, Grubby and Gimmick are accidentally shrunk and Grubby finds a new girlfriend, who flies away.
8	"Tweeg's Mom"	January 2, 1987
Tweeg runs off with the five crystals that L.B stole from Gimmick's house, and Tweeg plans to visit his mother, Eleanor.
9	"The Surf Grunges"	January 3, 1987
Tweeg follows Gimmick's team to find the last crystals while Gimmick fixes his compass. Teddy also makes fake crystals for Tweeg.
10	"The New M.A.V.O. Member"	January 4, 1987
Tweeg is at M.A.V.O and a celebration is held there while Gimmick and his friends replace the crystals with fake ones.
11	"The Faded Fobs"	January 7, 1987
Teddy and Grubby ask for help from the Wooly Whatsit to get the Fobs' colors back.
12	"The Medicine Wagon"	January 8, 1987
Tweeg plots to swindle the trio by selling them dubious "magic" potions.
13	"Tweeg Gets the Tweezles"	January 9, 1987
Tweeg finds the Tweezles, and Gimmick and his friends help him, only for drinking rainbow water.
14	"The Lemonade Stand"	January 10, 1987
Tweeg gets better and plans to sell fake medicine to people.
15	"The Rainbow Mine"	January 11, 1987
Teddy solves what was really going on in those two stands and closes the Falls.
16	"The Wooly What's-It"	January 14, 1987
Wooly saves the Elves and Woodsprites from a tree and, as a "thank you", is invited to her class, but Wooly does not understand it.
17	"Sign of a Friend"	January 15, 1987
Grubby loses his voice while the teacher teaches everyone sign language.
18	"One More Spot"	January 16, 1987
Gimmick and his friends go on a picnic, but their food is taken by bugs. Gimmick and friends join the bugs when they are captured.
19	"Elves and Woodsprites"	January 17, 1987
The Elves and Woodsprites are good friends until Tweeg starts a fight and a fire starts at the Theater Tree.
20	"Grundo Graduation"	January 18, 1987
The fire continues. Wooly grows big again and saves the show.
21	"Double Grubby"	January 21, 1987
Gimmick builds a multiplying machine which accidentally creates a duplicate of Grubby, who, in turn, argues with each other.
22	"King Nogburt's Castle"	January 22, 1987
Teddy and friends receive an invitation to King Nogburt's castle, who hosts a feast in their honor.
23	"The Day Teddy Met Grubby"	January 23, 1987
After the heroes stop a group of Gutangs from causing trouble, Teddy and Grubby tell the story of how they met each other.
24	"Secret of the Illiops"	January 24, 1987
The Gutangs launch an attack against Nogburt's kingdom. After a fierce battle, the heroes find a mysterious book.
25	"Through Tweeg's Fingers"	January 25, 1987
Wooly arrives just in time to fend off a third Gutang attack and unknowingly brings the antidote so save King Nogburt.
26	"Uncle Grubby"	January 28, 1987
Teddy, Grubby and Gimmick do research on Fobs. Meanwhile, M.A.V.O. holds a trial against Tweeg for his previous offenses.
27	"The Crystal Book"	January 29, 1987
28	"Teddy and the Mudblups"	January 30, 1987
29	"Win One for the Twipper"	January 31, 1987
30	"Tweeg Joins M.A.V.O."	February 1, 1987
31	"The Mushroom Forest"	February 4, 1987
After coming across a hot desert, Teddy, Grubby, and Gimmick stumble upon the Mushroom Forest, where they meet shy creatures known as Anythings. Meanwhile, the Gutangs barge into Gimmick's house and steal the blueprints for the Airship.
32	"Anything in the Soup"	February 5, 1987
Teddy, Grubby, and Gimmick set off to The Jungle With No Name to meet the Grunges, who have problems with their giant crops. It is revealed by the three Anythings that they are responsible after Teddy gave them the courage to leave The Mushroom Forest, and when they with three more Anythings hid as vegetables, the other three were taken away. Now it is a race against time before the captured Anythings are made into Grunge Gumbo. Meanwhile, the members of M.A.V.O. have built their own version of the Airship, The Eclipse.
33	"Captured"	February 6, 1987
Teddy, Grubby, Gimmick, and the Anythings face the villains and they are captured, but not before Teddy hid the crystals in The Eclipse's figurehead. When they refuse to tell Quellor where the crystals are, he orders Teddy to walk the plank and Teddy falls to his doom.
34	"To the Rescue"	February 7, 1987
After surviving the fall from the Airship, Teddy lands into a pool of water and is rescued by a mysterious figure. Meanwhile, the Anythings meet Prince Arin and Princess Aruzia, and ask them for help, while Wooly and Leota, after the confrontation with the Gutangs, lead them to find Teddy, Grubby, and Gimmick. With help from The Wizard they realize what has happened, and Leota comes up with a plan to rescue Grubby and Gimmick - who are now prisoners to M.A.V.O. - by purchasing a sack load of cotton candy. They soon find Teddy resting in a clearing.
35	"Escape from M.A.V.O."	February 8, 1987
Teddy wakes up to see Wooly and Leota beside him, and sets off to rescue Grubby and Gimmick. With the cotton candy from The Wizard, Teddy and Leota dress Wooly as a monster seeking to join M.A.V.O. as a jailer. Meanwhile, Prince Arin and Princess Aruzia arrive in the airship and The Anythings use their shapeshifting ability to get to Grubby and Gimmick. After staring at them for a while, they are able to get the focus needed to disguise themselves as Grubby and Gimmick so that Grubby and Gimmick can escape. While Wooly searches, accidentally scaring The Anythings in their disguise, Teddy snucks in and hides in a sack. Grubby and Gimmick do the same thing, and are not reunited until they are loaded onto The Eclipse and are on pursuit of their airship, controlled by Prince Arin and Princess Aruzia, once it is discovered by M.A.V.O. Teddy and his friends fill The Eclipse's boiler with popcorn and are able to jump across onto their airship before The Eclipse crashes and sinks in Leekee Lake, taking Quellor's Black Box he brought along, as well as the rest of the crystals that Teddy hid. Tweeg and L.B. simply swim for it, Teddy, Grubby, Gimmick, Prince Arin and Princess Aruzia go back to M.A.V.O. to collect The Anythings in the disguise of trash cans, while the confused Wooly goes home.

=== Season 2 (1987) ===
No.	Title	Original release date
36	"Leekee Lake"	September 14, 1987
Teddy and the others try to retrieve the crystals from the wreck of The Eclipse at the bottom of Leekee Lake. With the help of the hermit and his diving suit, Teddy gets the crystals and the black box from M.A.V.O.
37	"The Third Crystal"	September 15, 1987
Gimmick accidentally discovers the power of the third crystal: it turns objects and persons invisible. Tweeg kidnaps Fuzz and the heroes go to save him.
38	"Up for Air"	September 16, 1987
When Teddy is attacked by Drudge's sea monster-like cousin Dredge, while returning some scuba gear to its rightful owner, he discovers the secret of the fourth crystal that can generate oxygen for him to breathe. He is saved by the Hermit of Leeklee Lake, who does not know his true identity.
39	"The Black Box"	September 17, 1987
Gimmick and Grubby find that there are memories of Iliops and young Teddy on the crystal in the black box. L.B. steals the box; Tweeg brings it to the MAVO headquarters and becomes the new Supreme Oppressor, throwing Quellor in the dungeon.
40	"The Hard to Find City"	September 18, 1987
Supreme Oppressor Tweeg declares war on the Gatangs and had The Eclipse salvaged from Leekee Lake and repaired. L.B. frees Quellor to stop Tweeg and warn the Gatangs about the surprise attack. Teddy, Gimmick, and Grubby follow a tunnel from Leekee Lake and end up in the Hard to Find City. Eerily quiet, the three make the most of it by returning to the main room where they found the crystals. When they place the crystals back on the pedestal, they discover a central space for the seventh crystal. They then see Tweeg arriving on The Eclipse, and once landed, they are ambushed by the Gutangs with Quellor and L.B. Tweeg then decides to use The Black Box on them, only for it to backfire with him losing his memory. The Gutangs notice Teddy and his friends, but are able to escape thanks to the third crystal.
41	"Octopede Sailors"	September 21, 1987
42	"Tweeg the Vegetable"	September 22, 1987
43	"Wizardland"	September 23, 1987
44	"The Ying Zoo"	September 24, 1987
45	"The Big Escape"	September 25, 1987
46	"Teddy Ruxpin's Birthday"	September 28, 1987
47	"Wizard Week"	September 29, 1987
48	"Air and Water Races"	September 30, 1987
49	"The Great Grundo Ground Race"	October 1, 1987
Racing across The Great Desert to Gimmick's Valley, Teddy, Grubby, and Gimmick decide to go into the Mudblub's caves to collect some coal for the airship. Instead of using the third crystal to make themselves invisible, however, Gimmick accidentally discovers the secret of the fifth crystal when he uses it on Grubby, altering his speed by making him very slow and then very fast. The other contestants drive through the caves and they must avoid the Mudblubs. Through The Jungle with No Name, Tweeg falls into some quicksand and is pulled out by the M.A.V.O. agents sent to capture him for Quellor once he learned he was taking part in Wizardweek. They change from searching from Tweeg to trigs once L.B. tricked them into thinking he had a contagious disease.
50	"A Race to the Finish"	October 2, 1987
The final race of Wizardweek starts in Gimmick's valley, and Tweeg, thinking he can hit the contestants with his cannon, ends up hitting his mom. The M.A.V.O. agents, after being told off by Quellor, attempt to find Tweeg in the Grunge village. Prince Arin and Princess Aruzia fight off the M.A.V.O.'s agents by becoming The Iron Warrior and The Aluminium Amazon with the Grunge Gumbo with high amounts of vitamin Z. Teddy, Grubby, Gimmick, and the Grunges splash water on the two warriors that returns them to normal. Not wishing to face Quellor empty handed, the M.A.V.O. agents have an idea of collecting slime and telling Quellor they smoosh him. After Teddy, Grubby, and Gimmick win the race, they return to repair the Grunge village. As for the prize, Louie requires the Wooly What's-It's help in collecting it, and with most of the vehicles used in the races, creates a carousel and places it in the Grunge village.
51	"Autumn Adventure"	October 5, 1987
For a Rilonian festival of Make Believe, Teddy, Grubby and Gimmick disguise themselves as Mudblubs, and although their costumes do not seem to scare anyone, they manage to scare the only one who is not afraid of anything, the Wooly Whatsit. With the Wooly Whatsit dressed as a flower, they attend the Make Believe festival held by the Jungle Grunges. Meanwhile, Tweeg misreads the headline of the newspaper and thinks that Quellor changed his mind about hunting him down and throwing him into the dungeons. Thinking that he would want him back, he decides to go to Quellor personally to give him a present of chocolate slugs and thorns. Little does he know is that Quellor thought Tweeg was smooshed by the M.A.V.O. agents, which, when they gave a toast to Tweeg's Ghost, Quellor became exceedingly furious with the M.A.V.O. agents when Tweeg strolled in with the gifts. Quellor kickes the M.A.V.O. agents out and has Tweeg thrown into the dungeons. Overhearing Tweeg tempting to capture Teddy Ruxpin, the Understander tells Quellor of using him to do just that, but when he chooses the M.A.V.O. agents as a way of redeeming themselves, she releases Tweeg and, with L.B. in tow, set off to capture Teddy Ruxpin themselves. Teddy, Grubby and Gimmick are able to hide beside a cliff, tricking them to think they have climbed down it. When they do climb down, they end up being caught by real Mudblubs below.
52	"Gimmick's Gizmos and Gadgets"	October 6, 1987
53	"Harvest Feast"	October 7, 1987
54	"Wooly and the Giant Snowzos"	November 26, 1987
55	"The Winter Adventure"	27 November 1987
56	"Teddy's Quest"	30 November 1987
Teddy wants to give his winter gift to the Hermit at Leekee Lake, and sets off through the blizzard. The bounders go on strike, refusing to get firewood for Tweeg, but once they realise it was a dumb idea, L.B. volunteers to go to Tweeg's mom to borrow a loan. Meanwhile, the Understander of Legends is getting fed up with Quellor's obsession with catching Tweeg, when he is supposed to be catching Teddy Ruxpin and the crystals. This leads to a coup that has Quellor captured and thrown into the dungeons. Along on Teddy's journey, an elderly couple of elves has Teddy take shelter from the blizzard for the night. L.B. falls into some ice, but Teddy rescues him and takes him indoors to keep warm.
57	"Thin Ice"	1 December 1987
Bognostroclum is thrown into the dungeon when he refuses to acknowledge The Understander of Legends as the new Supreme Oppressor for not having The Black Box. Tweeg's mom is made the new Understander of Legends, the M.A.V.O. Dues Collector as the captain of The Eclipse, and Tweeg as the new Keeper of The Gate. Teddy and L.B. learn how to make snowshoes, and as L.B. returns to Tweeg, being caught in a net by Tweeg when attempting to catch Teddy for the high reward, Teddy continues to Leekee Lake. He soon finds that he is wanted by M.A.V.O. and is chased by M.A.V.O. agents, with Teddy falling through the ice, but thanks to the fourth crystal, he is able to stay submerged long enough to enter the underwater passage and onto the island, where he finds the Hermit to give him his present. They decide to return to Gimmick's house, and use skis to escape the M.A.V.O. agents. Staying at the elderly elves home for the night, Teddy songs to the Hermit a lullaby he remembered from his father, but is surprised to learn that the Hermit remembered it too. Only Teddy's father knew that lullaby, and Teddy realises that the Hermit and his father are one and the same.
58	"Fugitives"	2 December 1987
Teddy and the hermit discover that Grubby and Gimmick are placed under house arrest by M.A.V.O., who are heavily guarding and patrolling the valley. Thanks to Fuzz on passing on the message, Grubby and Gimmick manage to escape and are reunited with Teddy and the hermit in the Wooly Whats-It's place. With the crystal stethoscope, Gimmick discovers the hermit having the same blankness of personality as Tweeg after his memory was erased by The Black Box. As the hermit goes to get more firewood, he is captured by M.A.V.O. and they mistake him as Teddy. Once they realise he is not Teddy, the Supreme Oppressor decides to use the Illiop's trait of loyalty as Teddy's weakness. When Teddy comes to M.A.V.O. to rescue the hermit in the dungeon, he is ambushed, captured, and the crystals are seized.
59	"Musical Oppressors"	3 December 1987
The Supreme Oppressor finally places all six crystals in M.A.V.O.'s chamber, only to discover the darkness did not come as prophesied. Tweeg, meanwhile, hates being Gatekeeper and tells L.B. to get him The Black Box, since he knew where it was. As L.B. is taking The Black Box to Tweeg, the other monsters praise him as their new Supreme Oppressor. Teddy is then called forth to L.B., and while he sends the outraged Tweeg back to gatekeeping, he lets Teddy go, to return the favor in saving his life. Meanwhile, The Understander discovers that the center part in the ceiling has a seventh space, leading her to distract L.B. and the monsters so to retrieve the seventh crystal from The Black Box. Once it is placed in the space, it reacts to the six crystals and brings darkness to the land. As the darkness grows, Quellor's strength and powers also grow as he brakes free from his cell and escapes. Teddy is confronted by Quellor when seeking shelter in a cave, but escapes him with a cave in, only for Quellor to taunt him by saying... "It's too late! You'll see! All your friends have already started to turn against you!"
60	"M.A.V.O. Costume Ball"	4 December 1987
For this odd occasion, L.B. decides to throw a costume party, and appoints Tweeg to send the invitations, with Dweezil snatching one and returning it to Quellor, who sees this as an opportunity to take his position back. Meanwhile, everyone in Grundo is affected by evil due to the effect of the seven crystals in M.A.V.O., which makes it difficult for Teddy to collaborate with his friends. Gimmick is too busy inventing, Grubby is overeating, Woolly wants to go home, and Leoto is more focused on protecting the trees. The Hermit, throughout all this time, is at Tweeg's mom's house, where once she got an invitation, decides to dress up as an Illiop. She tells Sparky to keep an eye on the Hermit while she is out and not touch the goulash, but Sparky gets bored and wants to go to the ball as well, having the Hermit guard himself and not touch the goulash. Attempting to break his chains with a cleaver, he knocks over the goulash that dissolves his chains, freeing him and having to head off to M.A.V.O. to rescue Teddy. In the M.A.V.O. headquarters, they all dress as bounders, and L.B. falls in love with Buffy. Teddy and the others manage to make blinds for the windows but have a hard time putting them up because of his friend's evil nature. Teddy goes in and has the monsters chase him and crash into the wall, loosening one of the crystals that restores the world to normal; the friends recover and help with Teddy's plan. With the blinds on the windows, the monsters and villains still think it is dark outside and continue the ball. Leota and the woodsprites retrieve the rest of the crystals, including the seventh, and Teddy is able to save the Hermit from attempting to rescue Teddy. Quellor retrieves The Black Box and kicks L.B. out through the window, exposing the light, the missing crystals, and Quellor's frustration with working with amateurs.
61	"Father's Day"	7 December 1987
After L.B. explains to Teddy about the Seventh Crystal and learning about its secrets of erasing and restoring memory, he tells Gimmick to build their own Black Box, which they use on Teddy's father, who with his memory restored, tells him about what happened during his absence. Meanwhile, Tweeg's father comes to visit his son, and while he and L.B. are now M.A.V.O.'s Most Wanted, decides to go with him and spend some time.
62	"The Journey Home"	8 December 1987
Teddy, Burl, Grubby, and Gimmick return to Rilonia, where Teddy reunites with his mother and the other Illiops. Grubby also reunites with his Octopede family as well. Tweeg, meanwhile, is training with his father Elroy to be his successor surfer.
63	"On the Beaches"	9 December 1987
Teddy is finally home in Rillona and reunited with his parents. Xelxa's ship arrives, and on board are Grubby and the other Octopedes. Tweeg decides to hang up his villainous ways and leaves L.B., while L.B. proposes to Buffy, and she accepts. Elroy shows Tweeg his shack just off the Rillonian shore, and a bucket full of gold he just kept lying around, which causes Tweeg's old self to resurface. After his failed attempt to steal them, he decides to head home, but not before Elroy gives him the box of seashells as a reminder of the good times they had, without telling him he replaced the shells with gold.
64	"L.B.'s Wedding"	10 December 1987
Gimmick is having a hard time uncovering the secret of the sixth crystal. When Teddy shows his parents the ancient crystal book, Teddy's mother recognises the writing and gives Teddy a special reading lens to decipher the ancient language. While discussing, Grubby accidentally knocks over some orange juice onto the sixth crystal that causes it to fly. Tweeg, who is nosing outside, grabbs the crystal and ends up regretting it as he begins flying all over the place. Teddy, Grubby, and Gimmick go onboard the airship to catch Tweeg and the runaway crystal, but once the orange juice wears off, Tweeg falls into L.B.'s wedding cake when he and Buffy were planning their wedding on the beach. Tweeg throws the crystal back to Gimmick, and he, Teddy, and Grubby land and join everyone in Grundo for the wedding. As a wedding present, Tweeg gives L.B. his box of shells, but becomes frustrated when he discovers that it is filled with gold.
65	"The Mystery Unravels"	11 December 1987
L.B. and Buffy spend their honeymoon in the Land of Ying, but decide to come back to Tweeg just in time to use the money that Tweeg unintentionally gives them as a wedding present to pay off all his debts to Mrs. Maggotheart, which leads to Tweeg thanking them for saving him. Teddy, Grubby and Gimmick find out the mystery of the Illiop book when Teddy's mother gives him a special lens to decode the ancient language. It is revealed that within the Hard to Find City, all the ancient advanced technologies found throughout the series were once of a great Illiop civilization, which flourished throughout Grundo, helping people in need before the Gutangs came and conquered their city, which lead the Wise Ones and the Illiops to flee to Rilonia in the south, and the Land of Ying in the north. Teddy decides to go on another adventure to the north to find the Illiops with the help of Grubby and Gimmick on their airships. As soon as Teddy is done explaining to everyone what the seven crystals do, without them realizing, Dweezil takes the seventh crystal and returns it back to Quellor at M.A.V.O.'s headquarters as ordered, putting it back in his Black Box, but using the memory to listen in to everything Teddy says about the crystals and what they can do.: Note: "The Mystery Unravels" is the 65th and last episode in the complete run of The Adventures of Teddy Ruxpin.

== Development ==
In mid-1986, Atkinson Film-Arts, based in the Canadian city of Ottawa, was commissioned to co-produce (with Worlds of Wonder, Alchemy II, and DIC Entertainment) a 65-episode animated television series based on the World of Teddy Ruxpin characters. The series followed a prior attempt to produce a live-action series, which proved too difficult and expensive. Atkinson Film-Arts was in charge of the principal animation and casting.

Of the previous voice actors associated with the Teddy Ruxpin property, only Phil Baron (Teddy) and Will Ryan (Grubby) traveled to Canada to remain part of the cast; most other characters were re-cast with local Canadian voice talent. The series was originally intended to continue after the first series of episodes, but due to economic problems at Worlds of Wonder (the series' primary financial partner), a second set of episodes was not produced while Worlds of Wonder still held the rights to the property. Interest remains among the owners of the Teddy Ruxpin property and the fanbase to continue the story that originated in the animated series, which ended its 65-episode run on a cliffhanger.

=== Original concept ===
Originally, Alchemy II Inc. had hoped to create a live-action series using animatronic characters, as Ken Forsse had helped Disney do with Welcome to Pooh Corner. Due to production costs and difficulties in this format, Forsse, Alchemy II and Worlds of Wonder decided that the animation would be a better route and the 65-episode animated series was created. The pilot episode of what would have been the animatronic series was instead broadcast as an ABC Weekend Special in two parts airing from November 30 to December 7, 1985, and also aired in syndication as a two-part episode. The show can be found on videocassette. The "animatronic movie" (as it is referred to by Teddy Ruxpin fans) used primarily the same voice talent as the Teddy Ruxpin toy software had, most of which (with the exceptions of Phil Baron and Will Ryan) were replaced in the later animated TV series by Canadian voice talent.

== Home media ==
=== United States ===
Hi-Tops Video initially released a lineup of VHS tapes of the show. Episodes range from 1-3 per tape, and often featured wrap-around footage of a live-action Teddy Ruxpin, providing the role of the host of the tapes. Hi-Tops released twelve volumes altogether, making up seventeen episodes in all.

In August 2000, EnterTech Home Entertainment and Blue Steel Releasing released a VHS tape entitled Teddy Ruxpin: The Movie. Despite being marketed as a film and being "based upon the television series", it actually contains the first four episodes of the series edited together to form a film.

In February 2006, First National Pictures released two volumes of the series (11 episodes) on DVD. Two additional volumes were to be released to complete the series, but for unknown reasons, they were never released.

In January 2008, Mill Creek Entertainment acquired the rights to the series; they subsequently released all 65 episodes in three volume sets. The following year, Mill Creek Entertainment released a six-disc complete series box set featuring all 65 episodes on DVD for the first time. As of 2010, these releases have been discontinued and are out of print.

In 2012, Image Entertainment acquired the rights to the series. In July, they released a ten-disc set featuring all 65 episodes of the series entitled The Complete Adventures of Teddy Ruxpin on DVD in Region 1.

DVD name	No.	Release date
The Adventures of Teddy Ruxpin: Six Crystals	20	January 15, 2008
The Adventures of Teddy Ruxpin: Mysteries of Hard to Find City	20	May 6, 2008
The Adventures of Teddy Ruxpin: Return to Rillonia	25	July 22, 2008
The Adventures of Teddy Ruxpin: Come Dream With Me – Complete Series	65	January 27, 2009
The Complete Adventures of Teddy Ruxpin	65	July 10, 2012

== Impact in popular culture ==
The Adventures of Teddy Ruxpin was one of the first animated series from the Western world to be broadcast in Bulgaria in the late 1980s. The influence of this show can be seen in the text of the contemporary post-punk band REVIEW (РЕВЮ) and their song "Teddy Ruxpin" Ревю - МУЗИКА.POP.BG. Also, the first underground music shop to open in the nation's capital of Sofia was (and still is) called MAVO (ОЧЗ), a reference to the antagonists in the cartoon series.

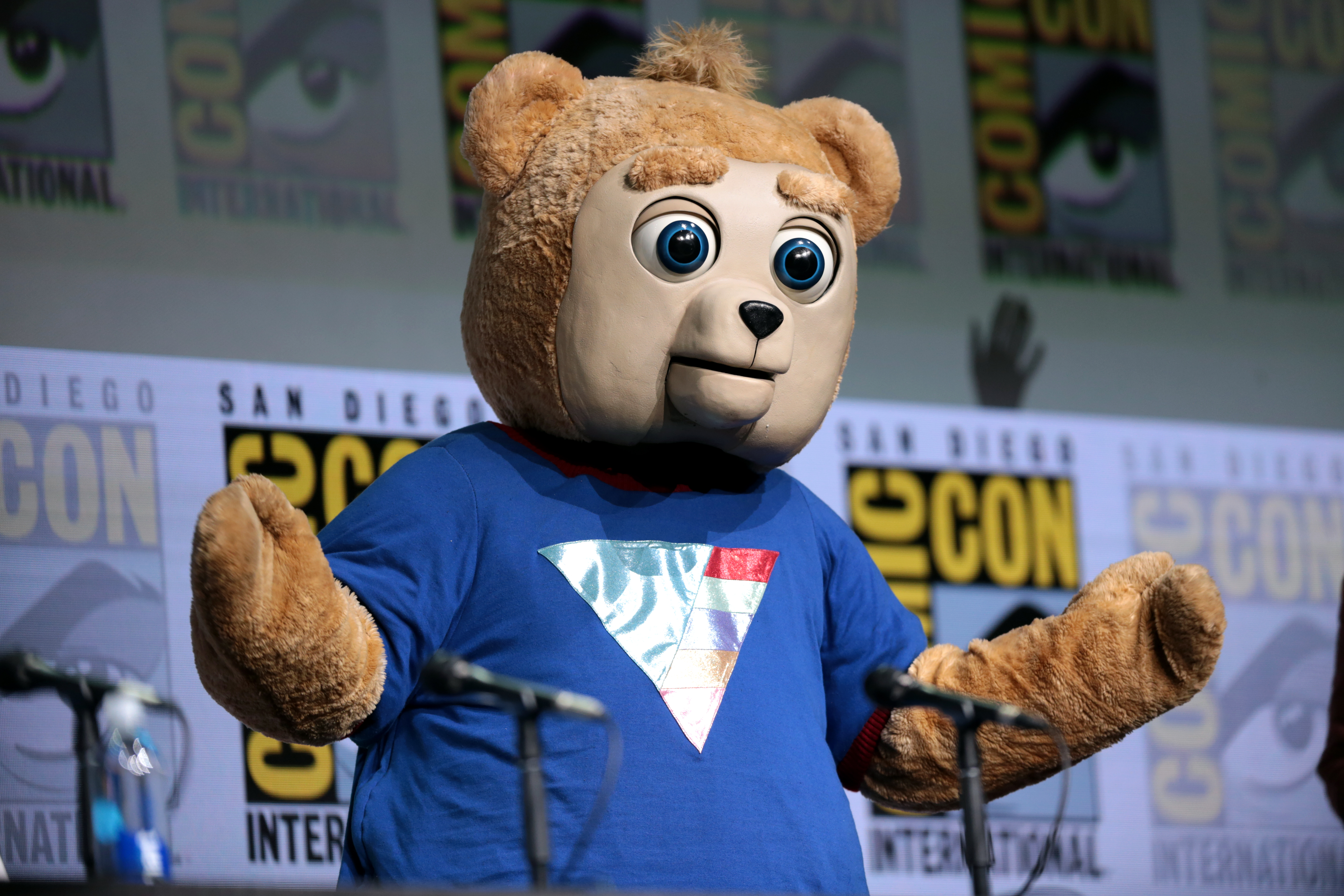
The titular Brigsby Bear at the 2017 San Diego Comic-Con

The 2017 film Brigsby Bear featured an animatronic bear suit, similar to the one in the animatronic pilot for The Adventures of Teddy Ruxpin. In the film, the suit is used in the production of a children's television series, which features magical crystals and creatures, just as The Adventures of Teddy Ruxpin cartoon did.

== Reboot ==
In 2021, DJ2 Entertainment announced plans for a rebooted TV series and film.
