= Marie-Soleil =

Canadian children's television series

- Starring: Suzanne Pinel
- Theme music composer: Suzanne Pinel
- Opening theme: "Je m'appelle Marie-Soleil"
- Country of origin: Canada
- Original languages: French; English
- No. of episodes: 145

Original release
- Network: MCTV; CJOH-TV
- Release: 1984

Marie-Soleil is a Canadian children's television show in the 1980s and early 1990s, which aired on many stations associated with the CTV Television Network. The show, starring children's entertainer Suzanne Pinel, used stories and songs to teach French to anglophone kids.

The series was initially produced by Mid-Canada Communications for the MCTV stations in Northern Ontario in 1984, and shot in Sudbury; however, as a resident of Ottawa, Pinel found travelling to Sudbury on a regular basis to film the show difficult to reconcile with raising her children, so after a single season it went on hiatus before production was relaunched on Ottawa's CJOH-TV in 1987.

The puppet character, an English-speaking dog named Fergus, was played by Jon Park-Wheeler. There was also a clown named Samuel, played by Suzanne Lalonde, who spoke with sign language for the hearing impaired.

The series was also later broadcast in reruns on YTV and later TFO.
