= Martin Seemungal =

Martin Seemungal is a journalist and foreign correspondent who has reported for the ABC News, CBS News, CBC National News, and PBS.

Seemungal was based in Nairobi, Kenya for ABC in 2003 after joining the network in 2000. He covered the outbreak of the Ebola virus in Uganda, flooding in Mozambique, famine in Malawi and a terrorist attack on Israeli tourists in Mombasa. Seemungal was Africa Correspondent for both CBC News (Canada) and ABC News (US) from 1991 to 2006. During that period he was based in Johannesburg, Cape Town and Nairobi.

He has reported from Uganda, South Africa, Mozambique, Congo, Somalia, India, Afghanistan, Yemen, Israel and Kuwait. He was awarded the DuPont Award in 2003 from Columbia University and received a Gemini Award nomination for "Best Television Reporting" for his coverage on the Rwanda Exodus. He has received two Emmy Awards, one for his series on Congo for ABC's Nightline in 2002 and the other, for his coverage of the Darfur crises which aired in 2004 on ABC World News Tonight. He has also been nominated for two Emmy Awards, one for his coverage of the Volcano eruption in Congo in 2002 which was broadcast on World News Tonight; the other for his series on 21st Century Africa which aired in 2008 on the PBS program Worldfocus.

In January 2011, he became Middle East correspondent for CTV News. His first report in this capacity was filed 23 January 2011. This marked a return to CTV for Seemungal who previously worked for CTV Ottawa from 1984 to 1988.

In 2014, Seemingal moved to PBS where he became a special correspondent for PBS NewsHour.

Seemungal is from Belleville, Ontario, Canada and graduated from Loyalist College in 1980.
