= Bill Luxton (actor) =

Canadian actor and broadcaster (1927–2019)

- Born: May 1927; Toronto, Ontario, Canada
- Died: July 13, 2019 (aged 92); Ottawa, Ontario, Canada
- Education: Lorne Greene Academy of Radio Arts
- Occupations: Actor; announcer; voice artist; cartoon character creator
- Years active: 1948–2010
- Spouse: Toots (1948-2017)

Bill Luxton (May 1927 – 13 July 2019) was a Canadian actor who worked in radio and subsequently appeared in television and on stage. He was best known for the role of Uncle Willy on the children's show Uncle Willy & Floyd and as a voice actor for cartoons.

== Early life ==
Luxton was born in Toronto, Canada in May 1927, to English parents. He moved with his family back to London, where they endured The Blitz during the early 1940s.

He joined the British Army at 18 and spent time in the signal corps, beginning in 1945.

His experiences as a teenage actor led him to the force's broadcasting system, where he trained as an operator and announcer. He spent six months in Germany and two years in Libya, re-settling in Canada after being discharged by the Army in 1948.

=== Radio ===
Post-war, the only job he could find was as a junior announcer in Port Arthur, now part of Thunder Bay, in 1948. He met his wife Agnes (known as "Toots") there and the couple remained married for 69 years.

Luxton attended and graduated from the Lorne Greene Academy of Radio Arts in Toronto in 1950.

Luxton was hired by Canadian radio station CKWS-AM in 1950 in Kingston, Ontario as an announcer.

=== Television ===
When CKWS-TV went on the air in 1954, Luxton was the station's first programme director and news anchor.

He created the character Uncle Willy for a children's cartoon show at CKWS.

In 1961, he moved to Ottawa and was one of the first employees at CJOH when that station was launched. Luxton worked at the station as an announcer on shows such as The Amazing World of Kreskin, when it was produced at CJOH, and as co-host of the long-running Morning Magazine in the 1970s and 1980s.

Luxton teamed up with comedian Les Lye in 1966 to create the Uncle Willy & Floyd show, with Lye playing Floyd. The daily children's comedy ran for twenty-two years and was syndicated across Canada.

=== Death ===
Luxton died on 13 July, 2019, aged 92, from a suspected heart attack.
