= What It's Like Being Alone =

Canadian animated series

- Genre: Adult animation; Comedy
- Created by: Brad Peyton
- Starring: Pete Cugno; Stacey DePass; Adam Reid; Dwayne Hill; Julie Lemieux; Andrew Sabiston
- Country of origin: Canada
- Original language: English
- No. of episodes: 13

Production
- Executive producers: Fred Fuchs; Brad Peyton
- Producers: Susan Ma; Marc Lougee
- Running time: 22 minutes
- Production company: Breakthrough Entertainment

Original release
- Network: CBC
- Release: 26 June – 18 September 2006

What It's Like Being Alone is a Canadian adult animated television series that aired on CBC Television in 2006. It is a black comedy created by Brad Peyton, and combines clay animation with voice work by Stacey DePass, Adam Reid, Dwayne Hill, Julie Lemieux, Peter Cugno, and Andrew Sabiston.

Having debuted on 26 June 2006, the series lasted only until 18 September of that year. The storylines of the thirteen episodes that aired during this timeframe center on the many attempts of fictional mutant children living in an orphanage to get adopted. Princess Lucy, a grey, fat, and warty orphan, is the main character, and the plot begins with her arrival at the orphanage. Critics regarded the series as unusual, and it received notably poor ratings. Commentators considered these ratings to reflect a generally poor performance of CBC programming in 2006.

== Characters ==
The storylines of What It's Like Being Alone revolve around the residents of the fictional Gurney Orphanage, a dark, run-down building. The orphanage has been described by a columnist as Victorian, and it may be set in a bog on the Canadian island of Newfoundland.

- Aldous (voiced by Stacey DePass) is the eldest of the orphans. She is tall, depressed, very gothic and obsessed with her own death, and carries a black umbrella. She spends most of her time moping about the orphanage and writing depressing poetry. It is insinuated that she actually cares for the other orphans, without letting this on too much.
- Armie (voiced by Adam Reid) is a boy with no limbs, except for his left arm. He glides around on a wheeled pallet, and often falls over when he uses his arm for something. He is happy and hopeful, despite his obvious handicap.
- Brian Brain (voiced by Andrew Sabiston) is an incredibly intelligent 9-year-old boy with two brains and three eyes. He is often seen inventing things, or gloating about his superiority.
- Byron and Beasly is a blue baby with two heads. Byron is constantly teased by Beasly, the more demonic head. They vomit acid, and are nearly impossible to bathe. No one is credited with voicing this character.
- Charlie (voiced by Peter Cugno) is a somewhat homosexual boy who is always on fire. Though he tries not to harm other people, someone or something always ends up burning. Like the other orphan characters, Charlie was part of the story from the beginning, and was specifically inspired by one of Peyton's jokes, "What's it like being alone? Like a sunset, but only if you're on fire."
- Princess Lucy (voiced by Dwayne Hill, who was also part of the "Story Department") is a short, fat, warty and grey girl who believes she is a princess. She is ego-centric, and quite crude, and has a long, lizard-like tongue; she often carries a lollipop. She firmly believes that she is the most deserving of parents. Peyton has said that she is his favourite character.
- Sammy Fishboy (voiced by Julie Lemieux) resembles a swamp monster. Outside of his tank, he must always keep a running hose over his head. He is often very rude, especially when he is drunk. He is in love with Isabella, a stone mermaid aquarium decoration, and becomes depressed when it is not around.
- Seymore Talkless is an eleven-year-old boy with no mouth and one giant eye. He expresses his emotions through his violin or a variety of signs that have a word or phrase written on them, and expresses panic through crazed hand gestures. No one is credited with voicing this character.
- Nanny Goodapple is the orphans' caretaker. She never speaks, and glides around the other characters. When out, she leaves the welfare of the other children in Aldous' hands. Nanny Goodapple is also something of a souse. No one is credited with voicing this character.

== Plot ==
=== Pilot ===
We all need a home. We all need a family. But for some of us, this home is a little harder to find. For some of us, being a touch odd presents its challenges.

— Narrator, "The Gurney Orphanage For Beginners."

The pilot of the series aired with some anticipation. Beforehand, columnist Randall Denley had written that "I suspect [it] will be the highlight of the evening," noting the series had been described as "wondrous and fiendishly humorous." The first episode, titled "The Gurney Orphanage For Beginners," features Princess Lucy and her suitcase falling from the sky in front of the orphanage and killing three rabbits. Upon getting up and seeing the orphanage, Princess Lucy believes she has found her castle and royal family. Instead, she is surprised to find the building is full of mutant orphans, and devastated to learn she is an orphan herself. She tries to escape, but finds any way out blocked by a lake monster and a dangerous forest, among other things.

Eventually, a woman agrees to adopt Lucy. However, the other orphans see that the woman will probably not provide the best home for her, and intervene. Lucy ultimately decides that she belongs in the orphanage more so than her ideal castle.

=== Series ===
Princess Lucy is a horrible mutant who thinks she's gorgeous. These characters suffer only briefly- they don't want to wallow in it, they want to have fun. And if I can drop a giant pair of scissors through an orphan's head and cause people to laugh, then I've done my small part for public broadcasting.

— Brad Peyton, producer

The series was continued with twelve more episodes: Themes explored include "social issues, pop culture references and humour." Due to the show having the visual appearance of a children's television series, each episode was preceded by a content warning, stating that the show was intended for an adult audience and that "parental discretion" was advised.

"Do Orphans Dream of Electric Parents?" is the second episode. It is about Brian Brain inventing robots and making them his parents, only to find that the robots want to divorce each other. In the next episode, "An Orphans Life Indeed", Princess Lucy seeks a best friend, but her vanity causes her to decide that only she can be her own best friend. Lucy then clones herself, but the clones prove troublesome. Seymore, who is in love with Lucy, ultimately solves the problem by slaughtering the clones with a chainsaw. One critic remarked that this was a particularly "disturbing" scene for the series.

The fourth episode, called "The Perfect Lesson", sees the orphans trying to perform a play to impress visiting prospective parents. It is from this episode that the show's title is derived, as the play repeatedly refers to "what it's like being alone". This was followed by the episode aired on 24 July, "The Poster Child" which is about a corporation that attempts to adopt Aldous to use her in advertisements. Aldous, under a witch's curse, must accept this shallow adoption or die.

In the episode "Fire the Reverend", a religious speaker visits the orphanage and confuses Charlie with Satan; the real Satan and his son later emerge, and Charlie finds out that while he is mistaken for being evil, Satan's son is trying to shed the perception that he is good. Eventually Charlie saves the day by persuading Satan and his son to leave the orphanage. The seventh episode is entitled "Red, White and Orphanage". It is about another orphanage abducting Brian Brain in order to exploit him in their plans for world domination. This was followed by "Sammy's Episode", which is about Sammy taking various medications, as well as shock therapy. The ninth episode is "A Tale of Almost Unbearable Sadness", which is focussed on declining morale in the orphanage and exploration of the dangerous forest.

Alternate names for the tenth episode are "Lucky Lucy" and "You Gotta Know When to Hold 'em". In it, Princess Lucy bets that Byron and Beasly cannot be cleaned and wins. She afterwards gambles more but nearly loses the orphanage in the process. The episode "Armie Loves Cigarettes" sees Armie taking up smoking. The twelfth and second last episode is called "A Frightful Flu", and in it Aldous entrusts care for the ailing orphans to a witch. The final episode, "Silver Screen Lucy" or "The Sweet Stink of Success", is about the orphans making short films to impress a prospective parent, but he ends up adopting Nanny Goodapple and Beasly and Byron, leaving the orphanage to Aldous.

== Production ==
The show was created by Brad Peyton of Newfoundland and Labrador, who explained that he identified himself as a "freak" growing up, and was thus motivated to try "celebrating flawed characters" in his work; he also employed stereotypical views of orphanages in the series. Peyton had previously made a black comedy short film called Evelyn: The Cutest Evil Dead Girl, and afterwards declined to shoot a major film. Instead, he turned to What It's Like Being Alone. He described the genesis of the series:

I had a friend who was depressed, so I went over to her house and started drawing. I made her a little book. She liked it and said I should try to sell it. So I photocopied 200 at Kinkos and sold them at Pages Books. Made like $150 dollars. That book turned into What It's Like Being Alone.

Peyton explained the writing by saying "it always comes out of an emotional place." One of the writers was Karen Walton, who had previously written the Canadian werewolf film Ginger Snaps. The producers chose the type of animation due to Peyton's personal interest in it, although he later claimed that a day's work could lead to seconds' worth of material. A factory was needed with 8 to 10 teams, with some of the animators having previously worked on the Tim Burton film Corpse Bride. The characters were made out of plastic and foam. Additionally, some animation was done through computers. Each character's figure had a number of add-on lips to express various sounds, and their eyes and eyebrows were also adjusted frequently during production. The figures could also be fastened into a surface, moved and fastened in again to portray movement. Peyton remarked that "The hardest thing is timing and pacing." Still, he also liked to emphasize that the series did not cost too much money to produce.

The airing of the series had been stalled for a year, perhaps due to difficulties within the CBC. To get CBC to adopt the series, Peyton showed the company a commercial with the CBC logo in blood, remarking that "It's been way too long that you've waited to have your logo covered in blood." He had also said that What It's Like Being Alone was meant to attract university and high school students as an audience, and he felt that these people did not ordinarily watch the CBC. CBC itself was looking for original material, and was enthusiastic about the series because it seemed to stand out among Canadian television productions. Peyton's co-producer was Fred Fuchs, who later rose in the CBC staff; one critic believed Fuchs' promotion to be a reason why CBC adopted the series.

== Reception ==
Critics generally found the series to be unusual. CBC critic Stephen Cole commented that What It's Like Being Alone has "arguably the most surreal opening sequence in TV history" with a shift in view from a black and white Canadian flag to the orphan characters. He questioned whether the show indicated the CBC had adopted "Addams Family values" and said that it was "the wildest CBC comedy since Twitch City."

One television critic briefly said that What It's Like Being Alone is a "weird show," and simply advised individual viewers to see it for themselves. If they "relate" to it, the critic added, "a 'Yikes!' is in order." Bill Brioux of the Toronto Sun commented that in combining a feel one would usually expect from Tim Burton with elements of Sesame Street, What It's Like Being Alone would probably not appeal fully to any demographic, despite its originality. Additionally, he felt Princess Lucy would be tiresome, and said he had hoped the show were more amusing.

In terms of ratings, the series did not do well. The Toronto Star described it as one of CBC's "prime-time dogs" with an audience of 78,000 people. The executive Richard Stursberg was blamed for cancelling the more popular Da Vinci's City Hall and This Is Wonderland to make room for this and other shows, and in general for being a "one-man wrecking ball" for the CBC (the series The One: Making a Music Star had also flopped on CBC in 2006). On 18 September, the series finale had only 163,000 viewers, part of the perceived "shocking" low ratings CBC received that year, along with the low ratings of the documentary series Hockey: A People's History and a mini-series about former-Quebec premier René Lévesque.
