= Turkey Television =

Sketch comedy series

- Created by: Roger Price; Geraldine Laybourne
- Starring: Les Lye; Christine McGlade; Adam Reid; John Koensgen; Kevin Kubusheskie
- Countries of origin: Canada; United States
- No. of episodes: 1 found

Production
- Running time: 15–20 minutes

Original release
- Network: Nickelodeon
- Release: 1985 – 1986

Turkey Television is a sketch comedy series originally aired on Nickelodeon from 1985 to 1986 and re-run until 1988. The show was created by Roger Price and Geraldine Laybourne at the request of Nickelodeon in response to the popularity of You Can't Do That on Television, another Canadian children's sketch comedy that aired on the network.

The conceit of the series, described in the theme song, was that a turkey named Thurman T. Turkey (voiced by Jim Thurman) had created television ("take one look and you'll know"), and traveled around the world filming television shows from other countries, then "bringin' it home to Hollywood and puttin' it on the air".

== Format ==
Turkey Television presented material from outside sources of varying vintage, from public domain footage (often re-edited and given new sound tracks, similar to Jay Ward's Fractured Flickers) to not so old clips presented as is (e.g., scenes from Jacques Tati's Monsieur Hulot's Holiday) to more recent excerpts (skits from the New Jersey Network's Uncle Floyd Show) to offbeat music videos such as "Fish Heads".

Regular segments and notable skits include:

- The Uncle Hogram Program, a parody of Mr Bill with Tom Riis Farrell as Uncle Hogram (who had a sadistic relationship with his hand puppet, Pippy)
- Ivan Telaly (John Koensgen), the announcing commentator for Russian True Facts News and “Hero of Soviet Union, 23rd Class”
- Service With A Smile, where a customer gets bad service from a ditzy waitress
- Good Ol' Kentucky Boys, a pair of stereotypical hicks discussing life
- Somebody Else's Mothers, two mothers who always give their families exactly what they didn’t want
- A psychology session hosted by Fred Newman as Dr. Joyce Brothers
- A parody of Hands Across America in which meat-waving children sing "Hams Across America"
- Gramps and Sonny, about a relationship between a young boy and his grandfather
- UFO (Unidentified Friendly Object), an E.T. spoof about an alien and a young boy
- Katie & Hillary, two teenage girls and best friends discuss teenage life
- Randi & Darby, about a relationship between a young girl and her dog (whose thoughts are heard by an offscreen voice)
- Vance Vain's Advice, a narcissistic teenage boy always tends to humiliate his younger brother
- School Bored Inspector, a school principal cares more about himself much to the chagrin of his secretary
- Dental Nightmares, a deranged dentist gives his patients some weird treatments
- The Gag Machine, shorts that involve some wacky hijinks

Animation was also featured on the show. Outside of the opening and interstitials, featuring Thurman in very Looney Tunes-like scenarios, there were also international cartoons including the works of Mordillo. Videos by "Weird Al" Yankovic also appeared from time to time.

== Cast ==
The cast featured Les Lye, Christine McGlade, Kevin Kubusheskie, and Adam Reid, all of You Can't Do That on Television fame, as well as several newcomers from Toronto: Steven Aiken, T.J. Criscione, and Craig Warnock. McGlade was also credited as a producer and a director. The cast also included John Koensgen as "Ivan Telaly" the Russian news announcer. John also co-hosted at least one episode as himself. Australian comedy character Norman Gunston appeared often, as well.
