= You Can't Do That on Television =

Canadian sketch comedy television series

- The show's title, superimposed on the face of cast member Les Lye
- Genre: Sketch comedy
- Created by: Roger Price
- Directed by: Geoffrey Darby; Brian Lebold; Brenda Mason; Alex Sutton; Roger Price; Gerben Heslinga
- Starring: Les Lye; Abby Hagyard; Christine McGlade; additional cast
- Opening theme: William Tell Overture (Dixieland arrangement)
- Country of origin: Canada
- Original language: English
- No. of seasons: 10
- No. of episodes: 143 (plus 2 compilations) (list of episodes)

Production
- Executive producers: Geoffrey Darby; Bryn Matthews; Jeffrey C. Weber; John Findlay; Geraldine Laybourne; Robert Wilson
- Producers: Roger Price; Geoffrey Darby; Brenda Mason
- Production locations: CJOH-TV Studios; Ottawa, Ontario
- Running time: 60 minutes (1979–80); 30 minutes (1981–90)

Original release
- Network: CTV (1979–90); Nickelodeon (1981–90)
- Release: February 3, 1979 – May 25, 1990

Related
- Whatever Turns You On; Don't Look Now; Turkey Television; How'd This Get Online?; You Still Can't!; You Can't Do That on YouTube

You Can't Do That on Television is a Canadian sketch comedy television series that aired locally in 1979 before airing in the United States in 1981. It featured adolescent and teenage actors performing in a sketch comedy format similar to America's Rowan & Martin's Laugh-In and Canada's Second City Television. Each episode had a specific theme, typically relating to the popular culture of the time.

The series was produced by and aired on Ottawa's CTV station CJOH-TV. Initially a local program, it was marketed specifically for a North American-wide audience from its third season on. It was staple on the early years of the American cable network Nickelodeon, becoming most famous for introducing the network's iconic green slime. The channel aired reruns through 1994, when they were replaced with the similarly-themed domestic sketch comedy variety program All That. The show was notable for launching the careers of many performers, including alternative rock musician Alanis Morissette, filmmaker Patrick Mills, and television producer and screenwriter Bill Prady.

The show is the subject of the 2004 documentary You Can't Do That on Film, directed by David Dillehunt. Filmed in August 2004, the documentary was released in North America by Shout! Factory in 2012 and reissued in 2022 by MVD Entertainment. The film's tour of Studio D at CJOH was the final production made in the original studio, as the space had been sealed for tax purposes by station management. The building was demolished in 2011 following a fire in February 2010.

The first 21 half-hour episodes were released on iTunes and Amazon in three volumes, beginning in December 2012, but these volumes are no longer available. In 2021, the first 14 half-hour episodes were made available on Paramount+. Outside of the 1989 Worst of You Can't Do That on Television VHS from Elektra Video, the series has never been formally released on home media.

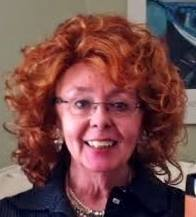
Abby Hagyard played numerous characters on the show.

== History ==
=== Local television ===
You Can't Do That on Television premiered on February 3, 1979, on CJOH-TV in Ottawa. It was a locally produced, one-hour, low-budget variety program with some segments performed live. The show consisted of comedy sketches, music videos, and live phone-in contests in which the viewer could win prizes such as transistor radios, record albums, model kits, etc. The format also included performances by local disco dancers and special guests such as Ottawa-based cartoonist Jim Unger.

Each week, the show took its "roving camera" to hangouts around town, recording kids' jokes or complaints about life, which were played on the following week's broadcast. The show also benefited from links with popular Top 40 Ottawa radio station CFGO. For example, station personality Jim Johnson emceed the disco-dance segments and shared tidbits about the artists featured in music videos.

Veteran comedy actor Les Lye played numerous recurring characters and was initially the only adult to perform in the show's sketches. He was the only actor to appear for the entire series' run. Actress Abby Hagyard, who played the maternal character "Valerie" opposite Lye's paternal role "Lance," joined the series in 1982. Occasionally, the older children in the cast, including Christine McGlade, Sarah West or Cyndi Kennedy, played adult characters.

The show offered programming for children on Saturday mornings that made no attempt to be an educational program. The idea was successful, as according to one episode the show scored a 32 share of the ratings for CJOH in its 10:30 a.m. Saturday time slot. The studio masters for the first-season episodes no longer exist, and all but three of the episodes from the first season were believed lost until early 2013, when copies of the missing episodes from off-air recordings were contributed by Roger Price and posted on YouTube.

The format was similar to You Must Be Joking! and You Can't Be Serious, children's sketch variety shows that Price created and produced for Thames Television in Britain from 1974 to 1978.

=== National television in Canada ===
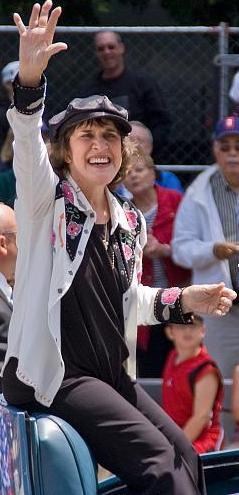
Original cast member Ruth Buzzi

After a successful first season, a national network version of You Can't Do That on Television entitled Whatever Turns You On was produced for CTV and debuted in September 1979. Its hour-long pilot episode had aired in May. The show's creators shortened it to 30 minutes, removed local content, and added a laugh track. They replaced music videos with live performances from popular Canadian artists including Trooper, Max Webster, Ian Thomas, Ottawa's own Cooper Brothers (one of whose members, Dick Cooper, later became a writer for YCDTOTV) and disco singer Alma Faye Brooks.

Ruth Buzzi joined the cast playing many of the adult female characters, including a strict schoolteacher named Miss Fidt and the studio secretary Miss Take. The 22 children from the first season were trimmed down to seven: Christine McGlade, Lisa Ruddy, Jonothan Gebert, Kevin Somers, Kevin Schenk, Rodney Helal and Marc Baillon.

Another first-season cast member, Elizabeth Mitchell, only appeared in the pilot episode. The show was placed in the 7:00 p.m. timeslot on Tuesday nights, and some CTV affiliates opted not to carry the show, possibly because of concerns about its content. As a result, CTV cancelled the show in December 1979 following poor ratings after only 13 episodes.

In January 1981, production on YCDTOTV resumed, and a new set of episodes aired locally on CJOH through May 1981. The format of the 1981 episodes was similar to that of the inaugural 1979 season, but each episode featured sketches that revolved around a certain topic (something that carried over from Whatever Turns You On). As disco's popularity had waned, the dancers were replaced by video-game competitions.

At that time, Price and Darby tried to syndicate YCDTOTV. They edited each 1981 episode into a half-hour format similar to that of Whatever Turns You On. Some scenes were reshot to remove any specifically Canadian content, and the half-hour syndicated edits became entirely sketch comedy. The 1981 season was rerun on CJOH in early 1982 in the half-hour syndicated format. To compensate for the removal of local content, Price and Darby created a new local show for CJOH titled Something Else, which featured many of the YCDTOTV cast in a game show/variety format similar to that of The Price Is Right. The YCDTOTV team also made a pilot television film for Disney in 1981 titled Bear Rapids that was never picked up.

Four of the hour-long CJOH episodes from the 1981 season ("Strike Now", "Sexual Equality", "Crime and Vandalism", and "Peer Pressure") are available for public viewing on YouTube. The rest are only currently available in the half-hour edits.

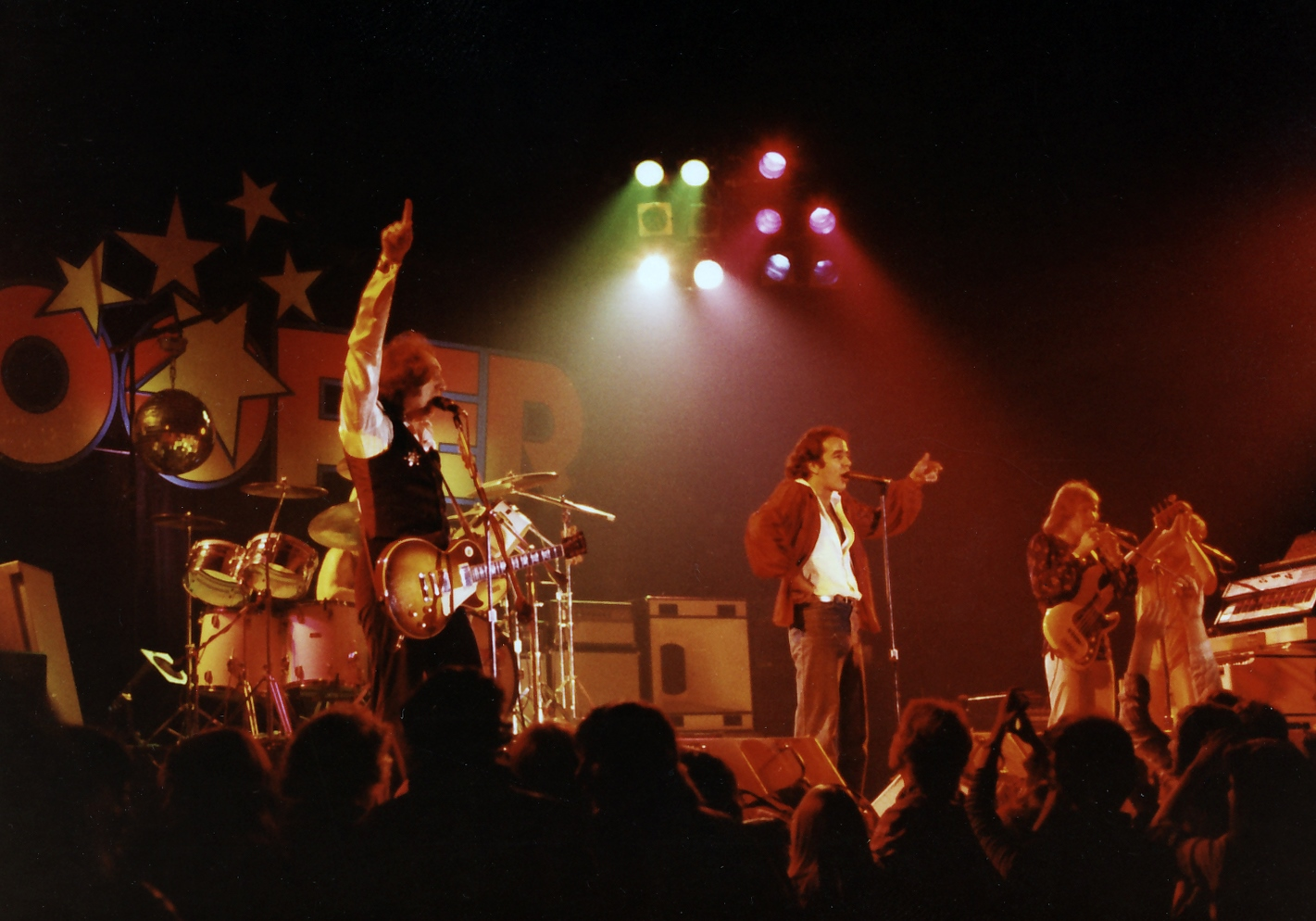
The show featured live music performances, including the band Trooper.

=== Nickelodeon ===
==== Peak years ====
In 1981, the new American youth-oriented cable network Nickelodeon took an interest in YCDTOTV. Nickelodeon originally aired several episodes in the edited half-hour syndicated format as a test run. The response was positive, and in January 1982, Nickelodeon began airing the entire edited season. By 1983, YCDTOTV was the network's highest-rated show.

Production on new episodes of YCDTOTV resumed full-time in 1982 in the half-hour all-comedy format, with Nickelodeon and CJOH as production partners. Over the next few years, the series was screened nationally in Canada. CTV, the network CJOH-TV was affiliated with, broadcast the show on Saturday mornings between 1982 and 1990, with little publicity. However, YCDTOTV continued to expand its audience in the United States on Nickelodeon, where it initially aired five times a week and eventually every day. The series gained broader exposure in its native Canada in 1988 when it was added by the newly established youth-oriented YTV cable channel. It was heavily promoted and aired daily during peak viewing hours.

Viewers in the United States were given the opportunity to enter the Slime-In, a contest hosted by Nickelodeon that flew the winner to the set of You Can't Do That on Television to be slimed. The contest was later replicated by Canada's YTV as the Slime Light Sweepstakes.

In 1983 at WGBH-TV in Boston, Massachusetts, Roger Price created a version of YCDTOTV for American public television network PBS titled Don't Look Now (originally to be titled Don't Tell Your Mother!). The show was similar to episodes from the 1979 season of YCDTOTV, including music videos and several earlier YCDTOTV sketches and motifs (including a variation on the show's trademark green slime gag called "Yellow Yuck"). Despite high ratings, the series ended after its five-episode trial run in October 1983, possibly because of complaints from parents about its content. Nickelodeon was also concerned that if Don't Look Now was successful, it could mean the end of YCDTOTV. The series was believed lost until all five episodes surfaced in early 2013. They have been posted on YouTube, excluding the copyrighted music videos.

Price created another show for Nickelodeon in 1985, the less successful Turkey Television. It featured several main cast members of YCDTOTV including Les Lye, Christine McGlade, Kevin Kubusheskie and Adam Reid. By this time, McGlade, now in her twenties and eager to move on with her life, had moved to Toronto and was flying back to Ottawa for YCDTOTV taping sessions. Turkey Television also marked McGlade's debut as a producer, a career that she continued after leaving YCDTOTV in 1986. Another Price production using YCDTOTV cast members, UFO Kidnapped, was made in 1983. Although the pilot aired on Nickelodeon, the series was not picked up.

==== Changing of the guard and controversies ====
By 1987, many of the veteran cast members such as Matthew Godfrey, Douglas Ptolemy, Vanessa Lindores and Adam Reid had grown too old for the show. Longtime host Christine McGlade ("Moose") had departed the previous year, as had Alasdair Gillis, who had been promoted to co-host with McGlade in 1985 before leaving toward the end of the 1986 season. Lisa Ruddy ("Motor Mouth"), McGlade's longtime sidekick on the show, left at the end of the 1985 season. Only five episodes were filmed for the 1987 season, tying with the 1990 season as the shortest during the show's 11-year run.

The episode "Adoption," was so controversial that it was banned after being shown twice. A "DO NOT AIR" sticker was placed on the master tape at CJOH. "Adoption" is the only episode that was banned in the United States. Co-creator Geoffrey Darby has stated that he felt the episode went too far, and that the writers were unaware of the sensitive nature of the material. In Canada, the "Divorce" episode was banned. The "Adoption" episode was shown with edits. In the sketch in which Senator Prevert calls the adoption agency to send his son back after using him to do chores all day, the line in which he calls the adoption agency officer a "damn bureaucrat" was excised.

Nickelodeon had removed the half-hour edits of the 1981 episodes of You Can't Do That on Television from its daily rotation, along with the 1982 "Cosmetics" episode. The 1981 episodes were set to air for the last time during a 1985-week-long promotion called "Oldies but Moldies," with contests in which viewers could win prizes such as "tasty, fresh chocolate syrup". Instead, the episodes continued to air until the end of 1987, but not often. Reportedly, this was because Nickelodeon's six-year contract to air the 1981 season expired in 1987.

As Nickelodeon was beginning to aim for a younger demographic, and many of the 1981 episodes dealt with topics more relevant to teenagers, such as smoking, drugs, sexual equality and peer pressure, the network opted not to renew the contract. Nickelodeon allegedly removed the "Cosmetics" episode from rotation for the latter reason, although the "Addictions" episode from that same season was not dropped. By contrast, when Canada's YTV began airing the series in 1989, they continued airing the 1981 season as part of the package, as well as Whatever Turns You On, which was never shown in the United States.

==== Final years ====
Roger Price moved to France following production of the 1987 season after being informed that Nickelodeon was not planning to order more episodes. Production was suspended for 1988. When Price eventually returned to Canada, he wanted to resume production of You Can't Do That on Television from Toronto, but was convinced by the cast and crew to return to Ottawa and CJOH. Nickelodeon ordered more YCDTOTV episodes for the 1989 season. Auditions were held at CJOH in the spring of 1988, and taping began that fall. Amyas Godfrey and Andrea Byrne were the only child cast members to transition from 1987 to 1989. A few minor 1986 cast members returned for episodes, including Rekha Shah and James Tung.

Opinions regarding the 1989 and 1990 episodes of YCDTOTV are mixed among longtime fans of the show, particularly regarding the new episodes' increasing reliance on bathroom humor and more slime and water gags, which was supposedly at the request of Nickelodeon executives. The show did not completely sever ties to its past, as many former cast members reappeared during the 1989 season in cameo roles, most notably in the "Age" episode, which was hosted by Vanessa Lindores, who was slimed twice during it.

Cameos included Doug Ptolemy, Alasdair Gillis, Christine McGlade and Kevin Kubusheskie, who by that time had become a stage producer on the show. Gillis appeared briefly in the "locker jokes" segment during the "Fantasies" episode. Adam Reid, who by this time had become an official writer for YCDTOTV, appeared and was slimed at the very end of the episode "Punishment."

The show's ratings declined throughout 1989 and 1990. The network's desire to produce more of its own shows at its new studios at Universal Studios in Orlando, Florida, coupled with low ratings, caused production of You Can't Do That on Television to officially end in 1990 after only five episodes (tying 1990 with 1987 as the shortest season of the series). Though ratings declined, Nickelodeon continued to air reruns until January 1994, at which point it was only aired on weekends.

On October 5, 2015, Nickelodeon's sister network TeenNick brought the show back in reruns as the first program on The Splat, its expanded classic-themed block. The airings began with the first two 1981 episodes, "Work" and "Transportation," marking the first time that those episodes had aired on American television in 30 years. However, only two additional episodes ("Christmas" and "Holidays" from the 1984 season) have been aired since. As of March 23, 2021, the 1981 season has been made available to stream on Paramount+.

=== International airings ===
YCDTOTV was aired in Australia with great success on ABC Television in the late 1980s, beginning with 1981's "Work, Work, Work." It first aired at 5:30 PM on weekdays starting in April 1987. After its first two runs, it was moved to a 7:00 AM weekday morning timeslot in 1989. In February 1991, it was back to afternoons at 5 pm on The Afternoon Show with Stephanie Osfield., where it continued until June 1991.

It then moved into a 11 am weekday time slot in December 1991, where it remained for the entirety of 1992, but many children would catch it during School Holidays. It finished up on the ABC in Australia, in the weekday 11 am timeslot in February 1993.

The series was also seen in European countries and reportedly in countries in the Middle East (with Arabic dubbing), although no French-dubbed version for distribution in either France or countries in the Francophone world is known to exist. Nor were any local adaptations based on the YCDTOTV format known to have been made.

YCDTOTV was broadcast in the United Kingdom (on the former satellite and cable children's network The Children's Channel), New Zealand (on TV3), Germany (on Armed Forces Network with the original English audio), Saudi Arabia (on the country's former English-language channel Saudi 2) and the Philippines (on RPN-9).

=== DVD releases ===
As of today, You Can't Do That on Television has not appeared in partial sets or the complete series. Announcements had been made that the series would be released in 2006, but the series has not materialized in home video on DVD or Blu-ray. No official information regarding the absence of this program has been provided.

=== Proposed reboot ===
In August 2017, it was announced that You Can't Do That on Television would be getting a reboot. Original creator Roger Price would serve as executive producer, while Jimmy Fox of Main Event Media would develop the project. However, Fox stated on their Twitter account on September 14, 2019, that the reboot had been called off.

== Trademarks ==
The show's comedy centered around how kids are treated by adults and the rest of the world. The show's skits gave satirical and exaggerated views of grown-ups as clueless, out of touch, and often using their status as adults to take advantage of kids. Les Lye portrayed several characters in the recurring skits, including "Ross", the technical producer and director of the show who constantly cheated and swindled money from everyone, especially the kid actors; "Barth", a cook at the fast-food burger place who cooked terrible food for the kids; and the father Lance Prevert, who tried to raise his kids but was utterly clueless about what his kids were doing.

The younger characters differed from other kids' TV shows in the way they often bickered and insulted one another, in their character roles, rather than getting along and enjoying their time together as seen on most other shows for children. Hosts Christine and Alanis frequently insulted each other and each tried to outdo the other in their roles, reflecting the real-life rivalries and competition taking place among kids in everyday life.

Episodes of YCDTOTV included recurring gimmicks and gags. The following is a partial list.

=== Opening animation: the Children's Television Sausage Factory ===
Originally created by Rand MacIvor (under art director John C. Galt), who was inspired by Terry Gilliam's "gilliamations," the opening animation sequence was a sequence of surreal images set to Rossini's "William Tell Overture" performed in a Dixieland jazz arrangement by the National Press Club and Allied Workers Jazz Band. Though the arrangement of the theme music stayed the same throughout the entire series run.

There are subtle differences between the themes in various seasons – especially the closing themes – and Whatever Turns You On used a completely different theme song. The opening animation changed in different ways.

- The Centre Block of the Canadian Parliament complex was used in the first season and in the original hour-long versions of the 1981 season episodes. In this animation sequence, a person pulls the roof off one side of the building, releasing three balloons bearing the likenesses of the three party leaders at the time: Pierre Trudeau (Liberal), Joe Clark (Progressive Conservative) and Ed Broadbent (NDP). A hand from off-screen then ignites the bottom of the Peace Tower with a match and it launches like a rocket. The start of the animation features a likeness of 1979 cast member David Helpin.
- There are two versions of the "Children's Television Sausage Factory" animation. In this sequence, children are "processed" in the "sausage factory" and deposited onto a school bus at the bottom of the factory that transports them to the TV studio, a likeness of the CJOH studios on Merivale Road in Nepean, Ontario. The first version was created for the half-hour, internationally syndicated versions of the 1981 episodes. The second version, which featured larger images and cleaner, albeit less fluid scene animation than the first version, was introduced in the 1982 season and was used for both the U.S. and Canadian broadcasts of You Can't Do That on Television until the end of the show in 1990.
- Both versions of the "Children's Television Sausage Factory" animation feature likenesses of Jonothan Gebert, Kevin Somers, Marc Baillon and Christine McGlade exiting the school bus, as well as a likeness of Les Lye as the security guard at the door of the TV studio. This footage was reused from the opening sequence of 1979's short-lived Whatever Turns You On.
- The ending of the introduction shows Lye's face with his mouth opening, and his face is stamped "You Can't Do That on Television." The screen is then cracked and splits, and the show begins.

=== Preempted show Intro ===
Starting in season two before the intro, there was usually a title card with a gag show that was "preempted" with the announcer Les Lye introducing it (ex: "Mr. T Thinks He's A Girl will not be seen today, so that we may present a show still trying to find itself."—Episode: "Identity Crisis"). A lot of 1980s cultural references were used at the time (The A-Team, General Hospital, Rambo, Mister Rogers Neighborhood, etc.). Sometimes, the show itself was preempted, which happened three times.

Further examples include the episode "Failure", which failed to come up with an intro. Another episode, titled "Inequalities," began with a disclaimer that read, "The following program contains certain scenes which may not be suitable for mature audiences, Juvenile discretion is advised" in lieu of a "pre-empted" show.

=== Opposites ===
Each episode had an "opposites" segment ("Opposite Skits, where the opposite of real life really happens"), introduced by a visual effect of the screen flipping upside down, shifting left to fade to the next sketch, and then righting itself. Typically, right before this happened, one or more cast members would be interrupted by another cast member saying the opposite of what the monologue (or dialogue) was about, at which the cast would say, "It must be the introduction to the opposites", and then the inversion fade would happen.

The sketches that followed were a tongue-in-cheek reversal of the show's subject and of daily life, often featuring children having authority over adults or adults encouraging children to behave badly. For example, eating sweets instead of vegetables or wasting money on something frivolous rather than putting the money in the bank.

Some "opposites" features were reversals of the roles and gags related to the show's recurring characters (usually played by Les Lye or Abby Hagyard), such as the cast getting to execute El Captaino at the firing squad or torturing Nasti the dungeon keeper. Inverse tropes related to Mr. Schitdler in the classroom and the principal in detention were also frequent; however, very rarely would an opposite feature the kids getting their revenge on Barth.

A return to the show's daily subject was indicated by another inversion fade, sometimes accompanied by one of the cast members saying, "back to reality." These would occasionally occur in the middle of a sketch, resulting in the characters inverting whatever they were doing prior to the conclusion of the sketch.

Opposite sketches were used in the inaugural season of the show (the first one, in Episode 2, was submitted by a viewer), but it was not until Whatever Turns You On that they became an integral part of the show.

=== Firing squad ===
Most episodes, starting in 1981, included one or more firing-squad sketches in which Lye played El Capitano, a Latin American military officer preparing to order a firing squad (whom he addressed as "the amigos") to execute one of the child actors tied up standing in front of a firing post. The kid would often trick El Capitano into being shot by the firing squad himself, and, as he keeled over, El Capitano would groan "That is one sneaky keed." Occasionally, El Capitano would overcome the child's attempts at tricking him and the execution would proceed as planned. On these occasions, the sketch would abruptly end just before the shots were fired.

=== Barth's Burgers ===
Starting with the 1981 season, most episodes featured sketches with the kids eating at Barth's Burgery, a fast-food burger restaurant run by Barth (Lye), a chain-smoking, unpleasant, disgusting cook who uses unsanitary and questionable methods of cooking burgers. Most of the sketches involve Barth revealing the contents of the burgers to the kids' disgust and them remarking "Who(or What) do you think is in the burgers". Barth's trademark catchphrase is "Duh, I heard that!" or on one episode "Duh, I heard thee."

In the 1981 and 1982 seasons, Barth had a worker, Zilch (played by Darryll Lucas), whom he frequently insulted and abused, often by hitting him with a pan and knocking him out cold.

=== Locker jokes ===
During the "locker jokes" segment of each episode, cast members, standing inside school lockers with the words "You Can't Do That on Television" painted on them, told jokes to each other. The person telling the joke would open his or her locker and call another cast member, to whom he or she would tell the joke. For the duration of the joke, those cast members would be the only ones seen with open lockers.

After each joke, the actors would close their lockers, allowing the process to start again with different people and a new joke. This was similar to the "joke wall" segment on Rowan & Martin's Laugh-In. The "locker jokes" feature was introduced in the first season and continued until the end of the series. The lockers underwent minor makeovers during the show's early years, but mostly remained the same for the entire run of the show. In 2004, when fans and cast reunited for the show's 25th anniversary, the original lockers were auctioned.

=== Production bumper ===
Used in a few episodes in the first two seasons and by almost every episode in later seasons, the closing credits of You Can't Do That on Television are followed by an announcement of the "company" that produced the program, with the name generally tying in with the episode's main subject. These announcements are given in the form of "'You Can't Do That on Television' is a ______ production." Examples of the fictional production company include "Black Eye" ("Bullying"), "Can't Give It Away" ("Marketing"), "Split Down the Middle" ("Divorce"), "Hang Out to Dry" ("Malls") and "Blood Is Thicker Than Water" ("Families"). The production company's name was announced by Lye, who often included a joke about the show or its producers only to realize that the cameras were still rolling.

=== Post-credit scene ===
The post-credit production bumper was generally followed by one final sketch, also borrowing a concept from Laugh-In, in which the jokes continued for a time after the credits finished rolling. The bumper frequently took place "backstage" and broke the fourth wall with remarks about the episode, usually featuring one final humiliation or comeuppance for that episode's main cast member. These scenes were often cut short or removed altogether, especially for airings on Nickelodeon.

=== Other ===
Other signature recurring bits on the show include:

- Fake commercials: Parodies of television commercials were part of the series as early as the first season and were the subject of one full episode in 1986, but the 1982 episodes contained commercial parodies that aired between the commercial bumpers where real commercials ordinarily fit. The products featured ranged from parodies of actual products, such as the Lotachi Lugman, a parody of the Sony Walkman, to completely fictional products, such as a fragrance called "Crème de Peanut". These fake commercials were cut when Nickelodeon became advertiser-supported in 1983, although some were preserved for later Worst of YCDTOTV compilations.
- Blip's Arcade: Blip, owner of the local video arcade, would find inventive and devious ways to cheat his customers, such as rigging unwinnable video games or running "specials" in which, he would exchange only three quarters for a dollar.
- Nasti's Dungeon: A kid (most often either Kevin Kubusheskie, Alasdair Gillis, Adam Reid or Doug Ptolemy; occasionally Lisa Ruddy, Eugene Contreras, Vanessa Lindores or Adam Klabfleisch) shackled in a dungeon for unknown reasons would be approached by prison warden Nasti, who would make the prisoner falsely believe that he was to be set free. Rarely, a prisoner could convince Nasti to free him or trick Nasti into exchanging places.
- Benedict Arnold School: Strict Mr. Schidtler wages an eternal war with his unruly, ill-prepared students. The school sketches include those in which Mr. Schidtler prevails by embarrassing or punishing students and those in which the students trick him into looking foolish or dismissing class early.
- Detention: Kids are sent to detention by the principal about what they did and one kid is hanging in shackles like he was in a dungeon. The detention is like a part dungeon and part classroom run by the principal.
- Various interiors of the Prevert home, including the front steps as Mom prepares to send the kids off to school.
- A bunk bed at summer camp where the kids discuss how uncomfortable and sadistic the camp activities are.
- A doctor's office, dentist's office and principal's office, all similarly evil or mischievous.
- There were also in-person interviews, during which Christine McGlade interviewed ordinary children about the show's topic and asked them about their opinions. The segment ran from 1981 until McGlade left the show in 1986.

== Water, slime, and pies ==
Affectionately called "stage pollution" by the cast and crew, certain keywords resulted in cast members having unpleasant substances poured onto them from above, or thrown at them from off camera.

=== Water ===
When someone said the word "water", "wash" or "wet", a large amount of cold water would fall onto them from above. In the earlier years of the show, cast members (especially Christine) were doused with pails of water. Starting in 1981, the water would fall from above. By the 1984 season, only the word "water" led to a dousing, whereas in earlier seasons, the words "wet" and "H2O" also did.

On occasion, cast members tried to dodge the water by saying "agua" (Spanish), "Wasser" (German) or "eau" (French) instead, only to be soaked anyway. In one episode, characters rehearse a sketch in a made-up foreign language; one of the made-up words is "pingle-ding" which apparently means "water", as the kid who says "pingle-ding" gets drenched (twice).

While the show's green slime changed ingredients and even consistencies, frequently, the water was almost always the same. Occasionally, cast members were doused with variations such as soapy, hot, brown, toilet, or yellow polluted water.

=== Slime ===
When someone said, "I don't know," green slime would pour down on them from above. This type of prank was known as being "slimed," and it became one of the show's most notable elements. As with waterings, the sliming gag was used in almost every episode, especially from 1982 onward. According to writer-director Geoffrey Darby, the slime gave the kids a "comeuppance", so that they would not appear arrogant.

Green slime was a fixture of the series from the very beginning, appearing in the show's first episode. In the book Slimed! An Oral History of Nickelodeon's Golden Age, Darby stated that the original slime developed "by accident". Darby had originally planned for a bucket of food leftovers from the CJOH cafeteria, with water added, to be dumped on cast member Tim Douglas, but the production of that first episode was delayed by a week.

When the time came to shoot the scene, the contents of the bucket had turned green with mold. Darby authorized the mixture to be dumped on Douglas anyway. Roger Price was furious, but the response from the viewing audience was positive, so Darby and Price wrote an entire 1979 show about the slime which fittingly aired on March 17, 1979, St. Patrick's Day, "The Green Slime Show". In that episode, cast member Lisa Ruddy became the victim of six slimings, a YCDTOTV record. With that episode, the use of "I don't know" as the slime's trigger phrase was introduced, and it quickly became the show's trademark gag.

Most of the cast did not like getting slimed. Christine McGlade said it was "gross and challenging". On occasion, they tried to avoid saying "I don't know." This usually backfired, as in the "Computers" episode when McGlade said "insufficient data" instead of "I don't know" and got green slime dumped on her anyway, since, as it was explained by Lisa Ruddy who was with McGlade at the time, the slime for that episode was computer-controlled. Some variations of the magic words also triggered the slime, such as in the "Blame" episode when the entire cast got slimed together after one of them said, "we don't know."

Although the slime was usually green, other colors, such as red, blue, yellow and even black and white, were occasionally used. The 1981 episode "Safety First", which featured white slime as part of a recurring joke in about "wearing white at night," was the first episode known to have used a slime color other than green. Lisa got slimed with white slime after saying "I really don't know".

In the 1982 episode "Television," Christine is slimed in green, red, blue, yellow and "stripes" (green, red, blue and yellow at once) while trying to explain about green slime to newcomer Vanessa Lindores. McGlade had the slime washed out by mentioning to Vanessa that it usually comes out with water, and then got dumped on with water. This sketch was later seen in the opening to the 1987 thriller film Fatal Attraction.

In one of the show's crueler pranks, Ross (Les Lye) tricks Christine into getting dumped with a thicker, chunkier blue slime. The 1986 "Enemies and Paranoia" episode used the word "freedom" as a trigger phrase for red slime after the studio was taken over by Russian communists. Other instances of slime colors other than green include orange slime in the "Myths" episode, brown slime in the "Cosmetics" episode and black slime in the "Time" episode.

The recipe for green slime originally consisted of rotten food. However, after continued complaints from the cast about the hazardous ingredients, the recipe was changed to a mixture of lime-green gelatin powder, oatmeal and water.

Eventually baby shampoo was added so that it the slime would wash out of the actors' hair more easily after several of the female cast members complained. In the "Television" episode, Christine reveals the ingredients as water, gelatin powder, flour and soap. In later years, the recipe consisted simply of green food coloring and cottage cheese, though it spoiled if left too long under hot studio lights.

Especially in the later years of the show, cast members who were slimed frequently looked upward into the slime as it was falling so that it covered their faces. The same was also true of the waterings. To avoid damage to the set from water or slime, a clear tarpaulin was laid on the floor, which can occasionally be seen and/or heard underneath the actors, and the loud splatter sound usually heard during a watering or sliming is that of the liquid hitting the tarpaulin.

Actors to be slimed or soaked usually appeared barefoot in the scene, and several cast members who were slimed were reportedly paid extra. Scenes involving slimings were the final ones taped during a recording, allowing the actors to immediately rinse after the scene without causing delays.

Green slime grew to become a trademark image for Nickelodeon, and the network demanded more slimings on the show as the years went on, resulting in episodes such as 1985's "Movies" in which the entire cast, except for Abby Hagyard, is slimed. Nickelodeon later introduced green slime shampoo, which was a frequent parting gift on its game show Double Dare, on which slime was heavily used. Mattel sold Nickelodeon slime and the Gak brand in the 1990s. Slime was also frequently used in the network's advertisements featuring YCDTOTV cast members as victims of an impromptu sliming. Nickelodeon's former studios in Orlando had a green slime geyser. The network continues to use green slime during its annual Kids' Choice Awards and coverage of the National Football League. Later the Nickelodeon game show Figure It Out also used green slime whenever a panelist did the secret slime action, he or she got slimed.

=== Pies ===
The original slapstick pie-in-the-face gag was also frequently used on YCDTOTV, although pie scenes were most common during the early years of the show. One whole episode, 1981's Drugs, was constructed completely around the pie-in-the-face gag. To avoid the wrath of the censors, the episode showed the cast getting "high" by pieing themselves continuously, comparing the stupidity of hitting oneself with a pie to that of taking drugs. Unlike the slime and water, pies were not usually triggered by any certain word or trigger phrase, although in the earlier years, saying "let me have it" or "give it to me" would frequently result in a pieing.

== Cast ==
Apart from the central cast as Les Lye and Abby Hagyard, who played the adult character roles, over 100 pre-teen and teenage actors appeared on YCDTOTV between 1979 and 1990. Some of the most notable cast members included:

Name	Year(s)	First Appearance	Last Appearance	Notes
Stephanie Bauder	1989–90	Episode 114: Choices	Episode 142: Privileges	Went on to star in Night of the Demons 3 alongside her fellow castmate Christian Tessier.
Nick Belcourt	1989	Episode 114: Choices	Episode 134: Effort	Known for a recurring gag of being unable to remember whether his name was Nick or Ted, stemming from a real-life incident during a read-through in which he read Ted Wilson's lines by mistake.
Chris Bickford	1989–90	Episode 114: Choices	Episode 143: Inventions	Fourth and final host. Known for his trademark leather jacket.
Jennifer Brackenbury	1989–90	Episode 114: Choices	Episode 143: Inventions	Referred to by some fans as "The New Vanessa." Jen co-hosted the Worst of YCDTOTV videocassette along with Chris Bickford and Christian Tessier.
Carlos Braithwaite	1989–90	Episode 114: Choices	Episode 141: Learning	The only African-American cast member during the show's 1990 season.
Jami Burning	1981	Episode 017: Strike Now	Episode 022: Smoking	Native American performer who appeared in traditional clothing; only appeared twice during the 1981 season.
Ruth Buzzi	1979	Episode 001: Live!	Episode 014: End Of The Line	Played many of the adult female characters, and was only slimed twice.
Andrea Byrne	1987–89	Episode 97 Back to School	Episode 122: Pollution	Famous for her "Little Orphan Andrea" persona in the Adoption episode.
Justin Cammy	1983–86	Episode 049: Classical Music	Episode 084: Revenge	Did not appear in any 1986 episodes although he is in the official cast photo. Appeared in his first episode clad in a diaper playing a sitar, as Roger Price's revenge for having to deal with Justin's difficult mother.
Stephanie Chow	1985–87	Episode 074: Families	Episode 112: Anniversaries	Offered the chance to return for the 1989 season, but declined.
Angie Coddett	1981–84	Episode 017: Dating	Episode 060: Foreign Countries	Known for her character "Angie the Talking Doll" during the 1981 season. She appeared in only one episode each in 1982 and '84.
Eugene Contreras	1982–85	Episode 029: Popularity	Episode 088: Movies	He and his brother Roddy were chosen after Roger Price, who had been looking for Hispanic kids for the show, overheard them speaking Spanish, although they had arrived at the studio too late to audition.
Roddy Contreras	1982	Episode 035: Television	Episode 035: Television	Roddy's appearances in his only episode were edited out of the Nickelodeon airings of the show post-1983, once the network became advertiser-supported.
Tim Douglas	1979	Episode 001: Live!	Episode 010: Boring	Tim was the first cast member to be slimed, and one of only two cast members to have the "real" green slime dumped on him made from moldy food leftovers.
Ian Fingler	1979	Episode 009	Episode 009	Only appeared in one episode.
Jonothan Gebert	1979–81	Episode 001: Live!	Episode 026: Peer Pressure	Jono was also a cast member on Whatever Turns You On and Something Else. By the 1981 season he was too tall to appear on the link set and was seen mainly in execution and dungeon skits.
Alasdair Gillis	1982–86	Episode 031: Vacations	Episode 109: Saving AKA Saving Money	Second official host. Cameo in 1989's Fantasies and Age episodes.
Amyas Godfrey	1986–89	Episode 089: Fairy Tales, Myths, & Legends	Episode 139: Embarrassment	Along with Andrea Byrne, Rekha Shah and James Tung, Amyas was one of only three kid cast members to transition from 1986–87 to 1989, and the only one to appear regularly in '89.
Matthew Godfrey	1986–87	Episode 091: Know-It-Alls	Episode 113: Smells	Older brother of Amyas Godfrey. He and his brother had just moved back to Ottawa after four years living in Dallas when they were cast; their time in Texas was occasionally used as an in-joke on the show.
Abby Hagyard	1982–90	Episode 027: Cosmetics	Episode 143: Inventions	Adult cast member. Her most frequent roles were Mom (Valerie Prevert) and the British-accented Librarian, but she played most adult female roles during her time on the show. She was not slimed until the 1989 season.
David Helpin	1979	Episode 001: Live!	Episode 014: End of the Line	David was one of the original cast members, and hosted many of the "call in" segments. He was slimed, along with the rest of the cast, in the St. Patrick's Day episode.
Brad Hampson	1979	Episode 002	Episode 010: Boring	Brad was one of the only cast members of the inaugural season to not get slimed.
Rodney Helal	1979–81	Episode 001: Live!	Episode 026: Peer Pressure	Rodney was one of a few cast members to be featured on both YCDTOTV, as well as its sister show, Whatever Turns You On. Although he was never slimed, Rodney was frequently on the receiving end of pies.
Ramona Helal	1979	Episode 003: Nickel and Dime	Episode 003: Nickel and Dime	Ramona was the older sister of Rodney Helal, and was only in one episode. She was however featured in several episodes of Whatever Turns You On.
Michael Hora	1983–84	Episode 044: Future World	Episode 051: Fame	Never Slimed.
Jim Johnson	1979	Episode 001: Live!	Episode 014: End of the Line	Adult cast member. Only on the show for first season as a disc jockey for music segments (common in the first season, but never aired in subsequent years).
Adam Kalbfleisch	1984–86	Episode 062: Moving	Episode 095: Country	Watered twice during his run on the show, but never slimed.
Cyndi Kennedy	1979	Episode 001: Live!	Episode 014: End Of The Line	Cyndi hosted several of the 1979 episodes, and famously went home sick after being slimed for the first time.
Martin Kerr	1981–83	Episode 025: Nutrition	Episode 040: Pets	Kerr joined the cast after Roger Price saw him in one of the local "Roving Camera" segments when the show aired on CJOH and decided he liked him. He also participated in Something Else.
Pauline Kerr	1984-85	Episode 061: Foreign Countries	Episode 079: Wealth	Martin Kerr's younger sister.
Tanya King	1981	Episode 018: Fitness	Episode 018: Fitness	Tanya only appeared in one episode, and is one of the few cast to avoid being pied, slimed, or watered.
Kevin Kubusheskie	1981–84	Episode 016: Strike Now	Episode 054 Courage	Kubusheskie became a writer and producer on the series during the 1989 and 1990 seasons, and on occasion made cameos.
Vanessa Lindores	1982–87	Episode 035: Television	Episode 113: Smells	Lindores was the show's third host, and returned to host 1989's Age episode. The only other cast member to have the "real" green slime dumped on her made from rotten food leftovers.
Tony Lefebvre	1982	Episode 036: Sports	Episode 036: Sports	Tony was one of only three cast members that never appeared on the link set, but was watered at Barth's.
Darryll Lucas	1981-82	Episode 015: Work	Episode 040: Growing Up	Darryll was the only actor on the series to play an exclusive role in one recurring sketch; He played "Zilch," Barth's often-abused burgery assistant. The only exception is, in Episode 032: "Vacations," in addition to playing "Zilch," he also played an umpire.
Simone Lumsden	1982	Episode 036: Sports	Episode 036: Sports	Simone also never appeared on the link set. She was properly "initiated" into the cast, getting slimed in the dungeon.
Les Lye	1979–90	Episode 001: Live!	Episode 143: Inventions	One of only two adult cast members, and the only one to appear in the show from its very first to its very last episode. Also starred in Whatever Turns You On.
Mike Lyon	1981	Episode 018: Fitness	Episode 024: Drugs	Appeared in only two episodes.
Christine "Moose" McGlade	1979–86	Episode 001: Live!	Episode 093: Garbage	Christine was the first official host. She featured also in many skits and also had a brief cameo in the "Age" episode in 1989. Her younger sister Lisa was used in some skits as an uncredited extra. She also appeared on Whatever Turns You On and Something Else, and went on to develop the short-lived Turkey Television with Roger Price.
Patrick Mills	1989–90	Episode 121: Security	Episode 143: Privileges	Mills became a film director and screenwriter, post YCDTOTV.
Forest Wolf Mohawk	1982	Episode 039: The Not-So-Fair-Show	Episode 039: The Not-So-Fair-Show	Along with Jami Burning, one of only two Native American cast members. Only appeared in one episode.
Alanis Morissette	1986	Episode 090: Pop Music	Episode 100: Contests	Appeared in a total of five episodes. Was slimed three times, but only one of her slime scenes aired (Pop Music).
Brodie Osome	1981–83	Episode 015: Transportation	Episode 049: Classical Music	Appeared in a total of 19 episodes.
Doug Ptolemy	1982–87	Episode 030: Fads and Fashion	Episode 112: Anniversaries	Ptolemy made a cameo appearance in the 1989 Age episode, after leaving and also had a battle with drug addiction after the show ended.
Natalie Radmore	1982	Episode 039: The Not-So-Fair-Show	Episode 039: The Not-So-Fair-Show	Natalie was slimed, watered, and pied in her only appearance.
Adam Reid	1984–87	Episode 079: Wealth	Episode 112: Anniversaries	Reid made a cameo in the 1989 Punishment episode. He also co-wrote several episodes that season with Roger Price.
Elizabeth Richardson	1982-83	Episode 28: Cosmetics	Episode 48: Inequality: Kids vs. Adults	Elizabeth is one of the very few cast members never to be watered, pied or slimed during her time on the show.
Lisa Ruddy	1979–85	Episode 001: Live!	Episode 088: Movies	Ruddy was a cast member on Whatever Turns You On as well. At the end of her tenure on the show, she, Christine McGlade and Les Lye were the only remaining original cast members. Ruddy was sometimes called "Motormouth" Lisa Ruddy, because of her tendency to talk a lot. She took the longest sliming of the show during the "Cooking" episode, having two extra large buckets dumped on her during the sliming at the dinner table.
Scott Sandeman	1981	Episode 019: Safety First	Episode 025: Nutrition	Scott appeared in only two episodes and is one of only a few cast members to be featured in multiple episodes without getting slimed, pied, or watered.
Sidharth Sahay	1989-90	Episode 116: Communication	Episode 135: Sports	Brother of Vik Sahay.
Vik Sahay	1986–87	Episode 105: Sleep	Episode 112: Anniversaries	Canadian actor of Indian descent, whose brother Sidharth Sahay, also appeared on show.
Kevin Schenk	1979–81	Episode 008	Episode 026: Peer Pressure	Schenk was also a cast member on Whatever Turns You On.
Ben Schreiner	1984	Episode 56: Ambition	Episode 76: Seasons & Weather	"Banana-brain" was known for his optimistic enthusiasm and often peculiar misconceptions, as well as a penchant for short shorts. Slimed in Literature, as punishment for bringing disappointing news to Moose, he looks up to take it head on. In his final two appearances he was relegated to mostly a background character.
Klea Scott	1982–84	Episode 031: Vacations	Episode 054: ESP – Magic Astrology	Scott was born in Panama. After You Can't, she played significant roles in the movies Minority Report and Collateral, as well as a leading role in the television series Intelligence. She also was featured in other Roger Price productions, such as UFO Kidnapped.
Rekha Shah	1986–89	Episode 094: Garbage	Episode 122: Pollution	Shah went on to star in another successful Nickelodeon show Fifteen. Was only green slimed once because she hated it so much.
Sariya Sharp	1989–90	Episode 122: Fantasy	Episode 143: Inventions	Sariya's trademark became complaining about her "totally Neanderthal mother" who never let her have her ears pierced, and her nice hair frequently getting ruined by green slime.
Marjorie Silcoff	1984–85	Episode 056: History	Episode 084: Revenge	Silcoff was watered in three episodes, but never slimed.
Kevin Somers	1979–81	Episode 001: Live!	Episode 019: Safety First	Somers was also a cast member on Whatever Turns You On. Like Gebert, he appeared chiefly in execution and dungeon skits by 1981 due to his height and age, although he did also participate in Something Else.
Amy Stanley	1989–90	Episode 133: Celebrations	Episode 141: Learning	Amy, the younger sister of Jill Stanley, was the only cast member not yet born when the series premiered in February 1979.
Jill Stanley	1989–90	Episode 115: Chores	Episode 141: Learning	Jill had previously starred in the movie Tommy Tricker and the Stamp Traveller as "Nancy." She had a problem with remembering her lines, which became a running gag on YCDTOTV. Was offered the hosting gig but turned it down.
Christian Tessier	1989–90	Episode 116: Communication	Episode 143: Inventions	Tessier is an actor and singer, whose first appearance on television was this program.
Sarah West	1979	Episode 007: The famous green slime show (St. Patrick's Day)	Episode 009: Executive Washrooms	Was the first female cast member to be slimed in the dungeon.
Teddy Wilson	1989–90	Episode 114: Choices	Episode 143: Inventions	Billed here as Ted Wilson, he later shared hosting duties on Never Ever Do This At Home and Innerspace.
Bradfield Wiltse	1979	Episode 007: The famous green slime show (St. Patrick's Day)	Episode 007: The famous green slime show (St. Patrick's Day)	Only appeared in one episode.
