= David Dillehunt =

American film director

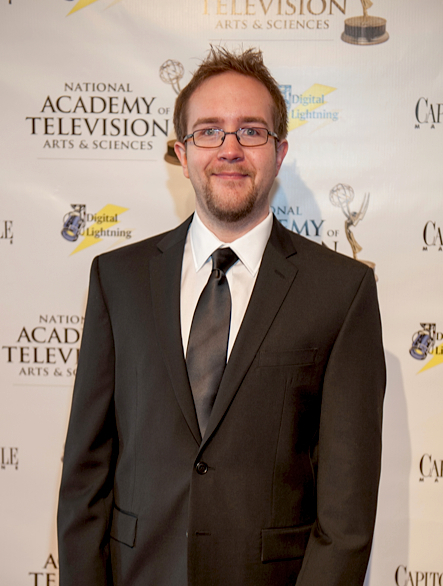
- Dillehunt attending the Capital Emmy Awards in Baltimore, Maryland.
- Born: David Nelson Dillehunt; April 5, 1984 (age 42); Charlottesville, Virginia
- Occupations: Director, Producer, Composer
- Years active: 1996 – present
- Spouse: Kristen Dillehunt (m. 2016)
- Musical career
- Genres: Instrumental; Film score; Indie Rock; Pop Punk
- Instruments: Vocals; piano; keyboard; guitar; bass; drums
- Website: daviddillehunt.com

David Nelson Dillehunt (born April 5, 1984, in Charlottesville, Virginia) is an American film director, television producer and composer. He is best known as the producer and director of You Can't Do That on Film and Marc Summers & Friends' 40 Year Double Dare Reunion.

== Career ==
At age 20, Dillehunt produced and directed You Can't Do That on Film, the 2004 documentary about the cult-classic children's series, You Can't Do That on Television. The film was released in North America by Shout! Factory in 2012 and reissued in 2022 by MVD Entertainment. Dillehunt also directed the official YCDTOTV reunion special, Project 131, and was a contributor to the book, Slimed!: An Oral History of Nickelodeon's Golden Age, by Mathew Klickstein.

He produced and directed the interstitial cooking show, Super-Naturally Healthy Kids!, which aired globally on Smile and Saturday mornings on TBN between 2009-2019, as well as the limited-run series, Super-Naturally Healthy with Joanna Faillace, which aired nationally on the NRB Network in 2010. Other notable works include the 2007 televised radio program, Midnight Barbecue, the 2008 sketch comedy film, Craptastic, and the 2011 music documentary, We Are Astronomers, which held its world premiere at the Virginia Film Festival.

In October 2026, original Double Dare host Marc Summers reunited with cast and crew members for a live-stage retrospective and celebration marking the 40th anniversary of the Nickelodeon game show. Recorded at City Winery Philadelphia near the show's original home of WHYY-TV, the streaming video special, Marc Summers & Friends' 40 Year Double Dare Reunion, was produced and directed by Dillehunt.

Dillehunt has released ten albums and five EPs of original music and is a founding member of the indie rock band Butterfly Vendetta. The band was referenced on the cover of the book, Regarding Charlottesville Music, by photographer and author Rich Tarbell, and in a portrait spread featuring band member, Bianca Vee. Dillehunt chronicled the band in an eponymous 2018 documentary. The film was nominated in the Award This! Music Documentary category at the seventh annual Award This! ceremony, held by Film Threat.

He is currently the Head of Multimedia Services for the City of Charlottesville, and manages the Charlottesville PEG-TV station group and Community Media Center. He was nominated for a Capital Emmy Award in May 2013 and May 2021 for his work with the department. Dillehunt was inducted into the Albemarle High School Alumni Association Hall of Fame in May 2023.

== Filmography ==
Year	Title	Notes
2003	Eviternity	Director
2004	You Can't Do That on Film	Director
2005	One Shot	Director
2006	Slapjack	Director
2007	Smoke Screen]	Director
2008	Craptastic	Co-director with Bryan Kasik
2009	At The Bottom	Director
2010	Paper Shoes	Director
2011	We Are Astronomers	Director
2012	Velvet Rut	Director
2013	No One Knows You	Director
2014	Craptastic Number Two	Co-director with Bryan Kasik
2015	Turn Off Your Mind	Director
2016	Oubliette	Director
2017	The Way I See It	Director
2018	Butterfly Vendetta	Director
2019	First Amendment Writes	Director
2020	Somewhere in Between	Director
2021	What Are You Watching?	Director
2022	Radio Daze	Director
2023	What Are You Watching Too?	Director
2024	Back in the Game	Director
2025	Distort the Sky	Director

== Discography ==
Studio albums

- Defying Belief (1999)
- Caught in the Act (2002)
- Somewhere in Between (2005)
- Chaos Theory (2008)
- Face the Music (2011)
- Turn Off Your Mind (2014)
- Surrender (2017)
- Hindsight (2020)
- Shapeshifter (2023)
- Dillehunt Drive (2026)

EPs

- David Dillehunt (1996)
- Incognito (2003)
- Playing with Fire (2009)
- Freak Flag (2015)
- Enemies of Love (2021)
