= Adam Reid =

Canadian actor

- Born: Adam Greydon Reid; Nepean, Ontario, Canada
- Occupations: Actor; producer; director
- Years active: 1985–present
- Spouse: Kristin Lehman
- Children: 1

Adam Greydon Reid is a Canadian actor, writer, producer and director.

== Biography ==
Reid attended Ryerson Polytechnical Institute's film program and won the 'Norman Jewison Filmmaker's Award' for his graduating short, Token for your Thoughts, which also won a 'Gold Plaque Award' at Chicago's Intercom: The International Communications Film & Video Competition. While directing commercials, music videos and shorts, Reid toured with the Canadian comedy troupe The Komic Kazes; this led his first film role, in the 1996 Kids in the Hall's feature, Brain Candy. In 2000, a 90-second theatrical spot for Toyota in which he stars as a pretentious and insecure commercial director, won a 'Gold Lion' at the Cannes International Advertising Festival.

Reid appeared in films, M.O.W.s and television series, including Disney's My Date with the President's Daughter(1998), Lifetime's This Time Around (2003), CBC's The Newsroom, Ham & Cheese (2004), The Buck Calder Experience (2006), Fox's Killer Instinct (2006), and USA's Psych (2010). As a voice actor, he has appeared in cartoons like What It's Like Being Alone (2006), Total Drama (2007) and 6Teen (2004–2010).

From 2002 to 2006, along with developing and directing kids shows like HBO Family's Ghost Trackers (2005–2007) and YTV's The Adrenaline Project (2007-2009), Reid ran a film mentorship program at the Toronto youth shelter Eva's Phoenix. The program produced two short films under Adam's direction, One Dollar One Day and Sheltered Life (2006).

In 2009, Reid completed his first documentary, Marion Woodman: Dancing in the Flames, which debuted in sold-out bookings at New York's Rubin Museum of Art and the Vancouver International Film Festival.

Reid returned to performance work in 2010, in the Hallmark Hall of Fame/CBS movie, "When Love Is Not Enough: The Lois Wilson Story", starring Winona Ryder as Lois Wilson, and Barry Pepper as Bill Wilson (Bill W.) Reid played Ebby Thacher, Bills best friend and drinking buddy, whose recovery from alcoholism inspired Bill to found Alcoholics Anonymous.

In 2019, Reid created the award-winning web series Hospital Show.

== Personal life ==
Reid is married to actress Kristin Lehman, and they have a son.

== Filmography ==
=== Film ===
Year	Title	Role	Notes
1985	Back to the Future	Boy	Uncredited
1996	Kids in the Hall: Brain Candy	Scarred Teenager	
2004	Ham & Cheese	Casting Director	
2007	I Didn't Do Anything	Charles Taylor	Short Film
2011	Recoil	Deputy Hedge	
2012	Underworld: Awakening	Med Tech #1	
2015	The Adept	Ben	Short Film

=== Television ===
Year	Title	Role	Notes
1985	Turkey Television	Boy	
1985–1987	You Can't Do That on Television	Himself	22 episodes
1991	Heritage Minutes	Joe Shuster	Episode: "Superman"
1998	Mythic Warriors: Guardians of the Legend	Lizard Boy (voice)	Episode: "Persephone and the Winter Seeds"
1998–1999	Birdz	Tommy Turkey (voice)	13 episodes
1998–2001	The Wonderful World of Disney	Donald / Reid Bosshardt	2 episodes
2000	The Famous Jett Jackson	Crash	Episode: "Eye of the Beholder"
2000	The Pooch and the Pauper	Bus Boy	TV movie
2001	Leap Years	Fig	Episode: "Episode #1.7"
2002	Screech Owls	Kidnapper	Episode: "Kidnapped in Tamarack"
2002	The 5th Quadrant	Walter Ryder Jr. / Walter Ryder Sr.	Episode: "A Clone... at Last/It's a Hollow World After All"
2002	Patti	Simon	3 episodes
2002	Doc	Dr. Larry Savan	Episode: "Complicated"
2002	A Nero Wolfe Mystery	Reporter	Episode: "Immune to Murder"
2003	Hemingway: That Summer in Paris	Jimmy Danelon	TV movie
2003	This Time Around	Jeff Blue	TV movie
2003	The Newsroom	Brad	Episode: "One of Us"
2003–2004	King	Loopy (voice)	26 episodes
2004	Bury the Lead	Donny	Episode: "The Revenge Specialist"
2004	Wild Card	Ivan De Samossy	Episode: "Wham Bam, Thank You Dan"
2004	Snow	Jordan	TV movie
2004–2010	6teen	Wayne / Additional Voices (voice)	78 episodes
2005	Degrassi: The Next Generation	Dave	Episode: "West End Girls"
2005–2008	Delilah & Julius	(voice)	31 episodes
2006	Killer Instinct	Boze	2 episodes
2006	The Buck Calder Experience	Josh Zander	TV movie
2006	Behind the Camera: The Unauthorized Story of 'Diff'rent Strokes'	Brandon Tartikoff	TV movie
2006	What It's Like Being Alone	Armie / Abraham Bickle / Dr. Dread (voice)	13 episodes
2007–2008	Urban Vermin	Zitzy	12 episodes
2007–2011	Total Drama	Justin (voice)	37 episodes
2009–2011	Poppets Town	Cozy / Cap	26 episodes
2009	Dunce Bucket		TV movie
2010	When Love Is Not Enough: The Lois Wilson Story	Ebby Thatcher	TV movie
2010	Psych	Toby Shore	Episode: "Not Even Close... Encounters"
2010	Skatoony	Justin (voice)	Episode: "Hooray for Bollywood"
2011	Collision Earth	Matthew Keyes	TV movie
2011	Supernatural	Judah	Episode: "Let It Bleed"
2011	Sanctuary	Bruno Delacourt	2 episodes
2012	Finding Mrs. Claus	Duncan	TV movie
2012	Ring of Fire	Glen Perkins	2 episodes
2012–2014	Continuum	Clayton / Coroner	8 episodes
2013	Goodnight for Justice	Fat Cat	Episode: "Queen of Hearts"
2013	Cult	Louis Beale	2 episodes
2013	Delete	Colonel Poterson	2 episodes
2014	Arctic Air	Greg Turpin	Episode: "The Fugitive"
2014	Motive	Graeme Jenkins	Episode: "Pitfall"
2014	The Unauthorized Saved by the Bell Story	Brandon Tartikoff	TV movie
2014	Hot Mom		Episode: "Gala"
2014	Gracepoint	Raymond Connelly	8 episodes
2015	Proof	Dr. Clarke	Episode: "Tsunami: Part One"
2016	Dater's Handbook	Michael	TV movie
2016	Paranormal Solutions Inc.	Chuck	Episode: "The Leprechaun of Mobile Alabama"
2017	When Calls the Heart	Mr. Stoneman	3 episodes
2018	Lost in Space	Peter Beckert	5 episodes
2018	Max Voltage	Mikey Thompson (voice)	
2018	My Little Pony: Friendship Is Magic	Firelight	Episode: "The Parent Map"
2018	Take Two	Paul Dorsey	Episode: "It Takes a Thief"
2018–2019	iZombie	Hobbs	10 episodes
2019	Project Blue Book	Donald Kehoe	Episode: "The Lubbock Lights"
2019	Van Helsing	Darius	Episode: "Together Forever"
2019	Hospital Show	Will	10 episodes
