= Suzanne Pinel =

Canadian children's entertainer

Suzanne Pinel, CM OOnt is a Canadian children's entertainer and former citizenship judge.

Using the stage name Marie-Soleil, Pinel performed for twenty years, using stories and songs to teach the French language to kids. She recorded albums, releasing her first disc in 1976, and starred in the television series Marie-Soleil.

In 1991, Pinel was made a Member of the Order of Canada for being "one of the great ambassadors of French-Canadian culture, this Franco-Ontarian teacher has helped promote bilingualism among both the younger and older members of the two language groups". In 2012, she was made a member of the Order of Ontario.

Before embarking on her career as a children's entertainer, Pinel studied nursing at the University of Ottawa. The university awarded her an honorary doctorate in 2002.

She was appointed a citizenship judge in 1997 and served until 2010. Since her term expired she has occasionally served as a guest presider at citizenship ceremonies.

== See also ==
- D'où viens-tu, bergère?, performed by Pinel
