= Abby Hagyard =

Canadian actress

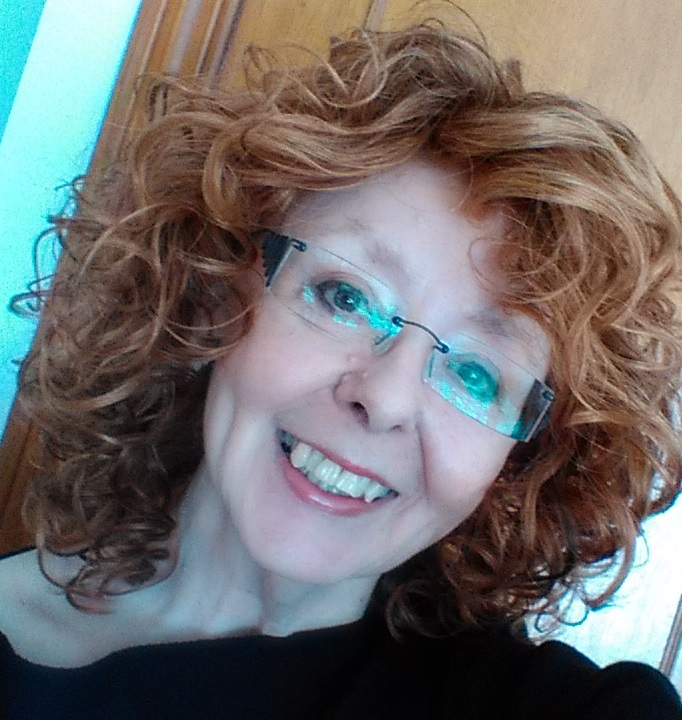
- Abby Hagyard (Ottawa)
- Born: Edmonton, Alberta, Canada
- Education: St. Patrick's College
- Occupations: Television actress; Voice artist; Comedian; Writer; Producer
- Known for: You Can't Do That on Television; The Adventures of Teddy Ruxpin; The Care Bears; For Better or For Worse
- Awards: ACTRA Awards
- Website: abbyhagyard.com

Abby Hagyard is a Canadian television actress, animation voice artist, and comedian, publisher, producer and playwright/dramatist best known for her appearances on Nickelodeon's sketch comedy television series You Can't Do That on Television, and her voice work on animated adaptations of The Care Bears and For Better or For Worse.

== Background ==
Born in Edmonton, Alberta and of Norwegian descent, Hagyard's interest in acting began when she was enrolled in a modeling class with her mother. She modeled for two years and then had a secretarial position in the New York offices of Playboy. She returned to Ottawa, Ontario, and studied drama at St. Patrick's College (now Carleton University) for 3 years. She began her work in entertainment as a high-fashion model on Miami Beach and actress. In the early 1980s, she toured the eastern seaboard performing in small venues, and then began hosting the CBC television show Scene from Here, while continuing to perform sketch comedy.

== Career ==
Referred to by the Ottawa Citizen as "one of our town's best and busiest actresses", Starring roles in dinner theater productions led to a one-woman show and an invitation to host her own entertainment series on CBC. In 1982, Hagyard joined the cast of You Can't Do That on Television as one of only two adult actors along with Les Lye, and both were mainstays on the program among its rotating juvenile cast until its end in 1990.

Between taping sessions, Hagyard provided character voices for the animated cartoon series For Better or For Worse, The Adventures of Teddy Ruxpin, Dennis the Menace and The Care Bears. She additionally co-hosted a morning drive radio show.

In 2005, Hagyard launched Now What? Strategies, a career and business branding service. That same year, she also launched AH Publisher, a boutique publishing service.

== Filmography ==
As actor

- You Can't Do That on Television (113 episodes, 1982–1990)

As voice artist

- The Care Bears in the Land Without Feelings (1983) – Friend Bear, Love-A-Lot Bear, Wish Bear
- The Care Bears Battle the Freeze Machine (1984) – Friend Bear, Love-A-Lot Bear, Wish Bear
- For Better or for Worse: The Bestest Present (1985)
- The Adventures of Teddy Ruxpin (7 episodes, 1986–1987)
- Care Bears (1 episode, 1988)
- Dennis the Menace (1986) - Additional Voices (Season 2)
- For Better or for Worse: The Last Camping Trip (1992)
- For Better or for Worse: A Christmas Angel (1992)
- For Better or for Worse: A Valentine from the Heart (1993)
- For Better or for Worse: The Good-for-Nothing (1993)
- For Better or for Worse: The Babe Magnet (1994)
- For Better or for Worse: A Storm in April (1997)
- For Better or for Worse (1 episode, 2000)

== Recognition ==
=== Awards and nominations ===
- 1983, ACTRA Award for 'Best Female On-Camera Performance'
- 1983, ACTRA Award for 'Best Voice-Over/Narration'
