= Care Bears: Unlock the Music =

Musical television series

- Genre: Musical; Animation
- No. of seasons: 2
- No. of episodes: 47

Production
- Running time: Approximate 7 minutes

Original release
- Release: June 30, 2020

Related
- Care Bears: Unlock the Magic

Care Bears: Unlock the Music is an American children's television series featuring Care Bears characters. The soundtrack was "managed and created" by Dave Padrutt.

The soundtrack features a number of musicians from Cleveland, Ohio.

Episodes have been released on HBO Max, the Cartoon Network and the official Care Bears YouTube channel.
