= Popples (2015 TV series) =

Children's animated television series

- Based on: the toyline and TV franchise by TCFC
- Directed by: Olivier Derynck; Ram Ganapati Rao
- Starring: Erin Fitzgerald; Grant George; Wendee Lee; Cassandra Morris; Cindy Robinson; Reba Buhr; Ben Diskin; Ezra Weisz; Karen Strassman; Christopher Corey Smith
- Composers: Noam Kaniel; Amanda Williams
- Countries of origin: United States; France; Belgium
- No. of seasons: 3
- No. of episodes: 26 (52 segments)

Production
- Executive producers: Jeremy Zag; Jared Wolfson; Aton Soumache; Cédric Pilot; Brian Casentini; Tapaas Chakravarti
- Producers: John Hardman; Phil Harnage; Elie Dekel; J.D. Smith; Sylvain Goldberg; Serge de Poucques; Adrian Politowski; Gilles Waterkeyn
- Running time: 22 minutes
- Production companies: Saban Brands; Method Animation; Zagtoon; Nexus Factory; Umedia; DQ Entertainment International

Original release
- Network: Netflix
- Release: October 30, 2015 – July 24, 2016

Popples is a children's animated television series based on the Popples toy line produced by Saban Brands, Method Animation and Zagtoon, in co-production with Nexus Factory and Umedia, with the participation of TiJi, Gulli, and DQ Entertainment International, and in association with SOFITVCINE 2 and UFund. The series portrays the adventures of the comedic pals Bubbles, Sunny, Lulu, Izzy, and Yikes. The series was commissioned by Netflix and was promoted as an original series for the platform. The last Popples television adaptation to air was a 1986 animated series.

== Premise ==
Popples are depicted as a species of creatures that can pop into and out of a ball. The story is driven by the optimistic comedic enthusiasm of the BPP's (Best Popple Pals): Bubbles, Sunny, Lulu, Izzy and Yikes. Always wanting to help their friends, neighbors and each other, their efforts often backfire in comedic ways and they must spend the remainder of the episode trying to unwind the mayhem they have caused.

== Characters ==
=== Main characters ===
- Bubbles (voiced by Cassandra Morris)
- Lulu (voiced by Cindy Robinson)
- Sunny (voiced by Wendee Lee in the first season and Erin Fitzgerald in the final two seasons)
- Izzy (voiced by Cindy Robinson)
- Yikes (voiced by Grant George)

=== Supporting characters ===
- Mike Mine (voiced by Ben Diskin)
- Gruffman (voiced by Ezra Weisz)
- Penny & Polly Popplar (both voiced by Reba Buhr)
- Miss Shush (voiced by Karen Strassman)
- Mayor Maynot (voiced by Various)
- Babapop (voiced by Various)
- Coach Loudly (voiced by Christopher Corey Smith)
- Mrs. Snooply (voiced by Various)
- HELP-R (voiced by Various)

Guest star

- Squeaky Pop (voiced by Megan Nicole)

== Episode list ==
=== Season 1 ===
10 episodes were planned for the first season; each episode runs for 22 minutes and consists of two segments. The episodes were released on October 30, 2015.

No. overall	No. in season	Segments
1	1a 1b	"Smart House Arrest" "Sunny Loses Her Pop"
2	2a 2b	"It Doesn't Take a Genius" "Palentine's Day"
3	3a 3b	"Help-R Hinder" "The Legend of Popfoot"
4	4a 4b	"Win a Free Treehouse" "Bubble's Doubles"
5	5a 5b	"Student Buddy President" "The BFF App"

=== Season 2 ===
The second season of Popples was released on Netflix on March 11, 2016.

No. overall	No. in season	Segments
6	1a 1b	"Fame & Misfortune" "A Do Do Do Do-Over"
7	2a 2b	"The Curse of Popple Pete the Pirate" "Teacher of the Year"
8	3a 3b	"Pop in the Name of the Law" "At the Pop of Her Game"
9	4a 4b	"Izzy Lost in Space" "Pop-Tivity Week"
10	5a 5b	"Popposites Attract" "Lulu's Poplooloo Juice"
11	6a 6b	"S-Pop-Eech" "Mayor Bubbles"
12	7a 7b	"Maid of Steel" "Pop-Tervention"
13	8a 8b	"To Err is Popple" "Dawn of the Dull"
14	9a 9b	"Pop n Hop Til You Drop" "Stop the Robo Pop"
15	10a 10b	"Fallen Pop Idol" "Bubble Trouble"

=== Season 3 ===
The third season of Popples was released on Netflix on July 24, 2016.

No. overall	No. in season	Segments
16	1a 1b	"Tele Popples" "It Takes Two to Tangle"
17	2a 2b	"Messy Pop Friends" "Hocus Pop-us"
18	3a 3b	"Camp Out Freak Out" "Ani Mall Insecurity"
19	4a 4b	"The Great Pop Race" "Fear Pop"
20	5a 5b	"The Pink Popple Moon" "Pop-Party Crashers"
21	6a 6b	"Pop-Sitters" "Pause for Alarm"
22	7a 7b	"Little Pop Lies" "Pop Luck"
23	8a 8b	"Seeing Double" "Virtual-Pop-Reality"
24	9a 9b	"FrankenPopple" "Pop Marks the Spot"
25	10a 10b	"Pop Up" "Pop-Art"
26	11a 11b	"Little Pop of Horrors" "The Popple Who Knew Too Much"

== Development ==
In 2012, Saban Brands acquired the Popples interlectual property from American Greetings' AG Properties. The relaunch was first shown off at Brand Licensing Europe in the same year.

In 2014, the series was picked up by Netflix. As a co-production between Saban Brands and ZAG Entertainment, the series premiered at the end of 2015.

After the series ended, in May 2018, Saban Brands sold all its properties, including Popples, to Hasbro.

=== Broadcast ===
The series made its linear debut in the United States on Discovery Family on July 1, 2019. It aired there until November 2021.

The series left Netflix in July 2023 due to licensing agreements that made it unavailable on the ad-supported plan.

=== Merchandise ===
Saban Brands had exclusive rights to the Popples characters and had distributed a toyline through Spin Master from 2016 to 2018. Much like their earlier incarnations of the 1980s, the toys can be rolled into a ball and "popped" back out.
