= Cloudco Entertainment =

American animation production company

Those Characters from Cleveland, LLC
- Trade name: Cloudco Entertainment
- Formerly: Those Characters From Cleveland (as trade name: 1981–2000s); AG Properties (2000s-2015); American Greetings Entertainment (2015-2018)
- Type: Private
- Industry: Entertainment, Licensing, Creative Services, Marketing, Social Media, Digital/Games
- Genre: Children and family
- Founded: 1981; 45 years ago
- Founder: Tom Wilson
- Headquarters: Los Angeles, California, United States
- Area served: Worldwide
- Products: Boy Girl Dog Cat Mouse Cheese; Buddy Thunderstruck; Holly Hobbie; Madballs; Tinpo
- Owner: Weiss family (2018-2023)
- Members: 11-50 employees
- Parent: American Greetings (1981-2018); IVEST Consumer Partners (2023-present)
- Subsidiaries: CloudCo, LLC
- Website: http://www.cloudcoentertainment.com/

Those Characters From Cleveland, LLC, officially doing business as Cloudco Entertainment and formerly known as AG Properties and American Greetings Entertainment, is an American animation studio and production company and which formerly traded as American Greetings' character brand division. Properties owned by the company include Holly Hobbie, Madballs, Buddy Thunderstruck, Tinpo, The Get Along Gang and Boy Girl Dog Cat Mouse Cheese, and formerly owned the Care Bears and Strawberry Shortcake properties.

== History ==
=== As Those Characters From Cleveland (1980s) ===
Holly Hobbie was created in 1967 as a line of greeting cards by American Greetings. Knickerbocker Toy Co. manufactured stuffed Holly Hobbie dolls from 1968 to 1983. The character's public appeal led to the formation of Those Characters From Cleveland, Inc. In 1972, the company introduced Ziggy, created by Tom Wilson, which soon had a newspaper cartoon strip generating significant additional income. Universal Press later purchased the creative rights. By 1977, Holly Hobbie became one of the top female licensed characters in the world.

Those Characters From Cleveland, Inc. was started up by Tom Wilson on behalf of American Greetings in 1981 to handle its licensing business. The first property out of Those Characters was Strawberry Shortcake, which, in 1981, generated $500 million in retail sales, followed by the Care Bears with $2 billion in sales over its first two years. The Care Bears characters were announced in 1982 with M.A.D., Marketing and Design Service of the toy group of General Mills, and launched in Spring 1983 with toys and a syndicated TV special.

Ralph Shaffer, senior vice-president and creative head at From Cleveland, oversaw the creation of Madballs, foam balls with disfigured faces. AmToy, another American Greetings subsidiary, released them as toys in 1986 and reached the #4 on the toy best-seller list by September of that year.

With Mattel, Those Characters From Cleveland launched Popples in 1986. In 1987, Those Characters came out with four different plush toys that do more than just be huggable, but playable, introduced in 1988 through three toy companies.

=== As AG Properties (2000s–2015) ===
In 2001, AG Properties named DIC Entertainment as the licensing agent for Strawberry Shortcake.

With DIC merging with Cookie Jar, thus transferring the rights, the company sued. In the settlement, AG agreed to sell the Strawberry Shortcake franchise (along with Care Bears and Sushi Pack) to Cookie Jar for $195 million with payment due September 30, 2008. Cookie Jar could not come up with the financing, but continued to claim to have licensing rights to Strawberry Shortcake. AG found a new buyer in the form of French company MoonScoop, while settling with Cookie Jar with AG to buy out its rights to Strawberry Shortcake. MoonScoop was to pay part of the purchases price to allow AG to pay Cookie Jar for its rights. Missing that deadline, AG backed out of the deal as MoonScoop attempted to complete the deal by the full payment deadline of June 7, 2009. MoonScoop sued with American Greetings winning the case in November 2012.

By September 19, 2012, AG Properties became the global licensing agent for Pūkeko Pictures’ The WotWots as they sub-licensed the property to EXIM Licensing Group in the Latin America region, Segal Licensing in Canada and Stella Projects in Australian and New Zealand.

Sean Gorman was promoted to president of AG Properties in June 2013 with the mandate to add franchises geared towards a young male demographic. Gorman was hired in 2007 as vice president, entertainment production and development.

Packages from Planet X was produced for Disney XD by Vancouver-based DHX Media and Disney, and premiered on July 13, 2013. In January 2012, American Greetings Properties and Exim Licensing Group international licensing agent signed a Holly Hobbie publishing deal with V & R Editoras for most of Latin America and the Caribbean.

AG Properties licensed to Lion Forge Comics Care Bears, Madballs and Packages from Planet X for titles under their Roar Comics all-ages imprint for release in late 2014.

On February 3, 2015, Iconix Brand Group signed a definitive agreement to acquire the Strawberry Shortcake brand and related intangible assets from AG Properties for US$105 million. DHX Media (now WildBrain) would eventually acquire the franchise in 2017 as part of their buyout of Iconix's entertainment assets, which also included an 80% majority stake in Peanuts owner Peanuts Worldwide.

=== As American Greetings Entertainment (2015–18) ===
On October 6, 2015, American Greetings changed the unit's name to American Greetings Entertainment as an indication of a shift in focus to the Care Bears property, alongside additional multi-character and entertainment properties. On October 11, the newly-renamed company announced Buddy Thunderstruck, a stop-motion animated series co-produced with Stoopid Buddy Stoodios that would premiere on Netflix in 2017.

In May 2016, Irish production company Sixteen South named American Greetings Entertainment the worldwide distributor of Claude, an animated TV Adaptation of Alex T. Smith's bestselling children's picture book series. On October 17, 2016, the company announced a partnership with Gaumont Animation to relaunch Herself the Elf with a new television series that the two companies would co-develop, co-produce and co-distribute.

On October 13, 2017, UK pre-school broadcaster CBeebies greenlit a Tinpo television series, which would be co-produced by Dentsu, OLM Digital and Sprite Animation Studios, for a late 2018 release on the network.

In April 2018, Hulu commissioned a Holly Hobbie live-action TV series by Aircraft Pictures. It ran for five seasons and 50 episodes. In May 2018, an advert showcased at the Licensing Expo showcased new redesigns of the Care Bears for a new television series that would premiere in Late-2018.

=== As Cloudco Entertainment (2018–23) ===
On April 6, 2018, the Weiss family announced it was to sell the majority shareholding in American Greetings to US investment company, Clayton Dubilier & Rice. The ownership of American Greetings Entertainment was fully retained by the Weiss family, and so, on August 28, 2018, the company was spun off from American Greetings as Cloudco Entertainment, becoming a stand-alone company. The previous management was retained, including president Sean Gorman.

On September 6, the planned new Care Bears animated series previously previewed at the licensing expo would be called Care Bears: Unlock the Magic and would premiere on the Boomerang SVOD service in January 2019. On September 20, 2018, Cloudco announced they had opened up a UK office.

The animated series Boy Girl Dog Cat Mouse Cheese was co-commissioned by CBBC and Gulli in October 2018, co-produced with Watch Next Media in France and Kavaleer Productions in Ireland, and premiered on October 31, 2019.

On June 24, 2019, Warner Music Group's Arts Music division launched the licensed Cloudco Entertainment label with the release of the current Holly Hobbie TV show theme song as a part of a multi-season deal.

In January 2021, Cloudco announced they would team up with Topps to create a new toy range that crosses over Cloudco's Madballs and Topps' Garbage Pail Kids franchises. On March 16, 2021, Cloudco and Marblemedia announced they would team-up to co-produce a new live-action comedy series called Overlord and the Underwoods. On the same day, it was confirmed that the show had been picked up by Nickelodeon internationally, ITV in the United Kingdom, CBC in Canada and BYUtv in the United States.

In October 2022, it was announced that a live-action television adaption of Pretty Freekin Scary was commissioned for Disney Channel as a co-production with CakeStart Entertainment, a joint venture between Cake Entertainment and Kickstart Entertainment, as part of the latter's first-look deal with Disney.

=== Purchase by IVEST Consumer Partners (2023–present) ===
On August 24, 2023, it was announced that Canadian-based private equity firm IVEST Consumer Partners had purchased Cloudco Entertainment for $100 Million. IVEST's intentions with Cloudco is to focus on the Care Bears brand and turn it into a major household name by helping introduce the franchise to a new generation of children, and producing 'retro'-style merchandise featuring the classic Care Bears and Care Bear Cousins characters, geared towards the now-adult audience who grew up with it, through collaborations with retailers such as Primark, Shein, Claire's, Pop Mart and MINISO. Other plans include utilizing existing Cloudco properties for developing new content, producing new IP, as well as Cloudco being used to acquire and license other properties that IVEST could pick up in the future.

On October 16, 2024, Cloudco and WildBrain announced the production of a new forty-four minute special entitled The Care Berry Switch, which crosses over Strawberry Shortcake with the Care Bears for the first time. This is Cloudco's first Strawberry Shortcake production to be made by the company since the sale of the property to Iconix/WildBrain in February 2015.

On June 5, 2025, it was announced that a live-action/animated Care Bears film was put into development at Warner Bros. Pictures, with Josh Greenbaum being announced as director.

In June 2026, it was announced that the intellectual property of Care Bears will be acquired by Authentic Brands Group. On August 20, 2026, the acquisition was completed.

== Properties ==
=== Current ===
- Boy Girl Dog Cat Mouse Cheese (2006)
- Buddy Thunderstruck (2015)
- The Get Along Gang (1983)
- Holly Hobbie (1967)
  - Holly Hobbie & Friends (2005)
- Herself the Elf
- Lady Lovely Locks (1987)
- Madballs (1985)
- Maryoku Yummy (2001)
- Overlord and the Underwoods (2021)
- Packages from Planet X (2006)
- Pretty Freekin Scary (2006)
- Sushi Pack (2006)
- Tinpo (2007)
- Twisted Whiskers (2001)

=== Ownership unknown ===
- Brush-a-Loves (1987)
- FlopaLots (1987)
- Nosy Bears (1987)
- Peppermint Rose (1990)
- Special Blessings (1987)

=== Sold ===
- Care Bears (1981) - Sold to Authentic Brands Group in 2026.
  - Care Bear Cousins
- My Pet Monster (1986) - Sold to Saban Brands in 2012, now owned by Hasbro.
- Popples (1986) - Toys initially produced by Mattel; sold to Saban Brands in 2012, now owned by Hasbro.
- Strawberry Shortcake (1980) - sold to Iconix Brand Group in 2015, now owned by WildBrain.
  - The Berrykins - Strawberry Shortcake's little forest pals
- Ziggy (1972) - Sold off in 2011.

== Content ==
=== Television series ===
Title	Year(s)	Network	Co-production with	Notes	Sources
The Get Along Gang	1984	CBS	DIC Audiovisuel		
Care Bears	1985	Syndication	DIC Audiovisuel; LBS Communications		
The Care Bears Family	1986–88	Global Television Network	Nelvana	Retitled Care Bears for third series	
My Pet Monster	1986–88	Global Television Network	Nelvana		
Popples	1986–88	Syndication	DIC Enterprises		
Lady Lovely Locks	1987	Syndication	DIC Enterprises		
Ring Raiders	1989	Syndication	DIC Enterprises; Bohbot Communications		
Strawberry Shortcake	2003–08	Direct-to-video; Syndication; CBS	DIC Entertainment Corporation	Originally a Direct-to-Video series, new episodes were released this way in the United States	
Care Bears: Adventures in Care-a-lot	2007–08	CBS	SD Entertainment		
Tinpo	2007–08	CBS		Short-form series	
Sushi Pack	2007–09	CBS	DIC Entertainment Corporation; Studio Espinosa; Tom Ruegger Productions; The Hatchery, LLC	Cloudco handles distribution in North America, DIC/WildBrain handles distribution internationally	
Strawberry Shortcake's Berry Bitty Adventures	2009–15	The Hub/Discovery Family	MoonScoop Entertainment/Splash Entertainment		
The Twisted Whiskers Show	2009	The Hub	DQ Entertainment; MoonScoop Entertainment; Telegael		
Maryoku Yummy	2010	The Hub	DQ Entertainment; Telegael		
Care Bears: Welcome to Care-a-Lot	2012	The Hub	MoonScoop Entertainment		
Packages from Planet X	2013–14	Disney XD Canada; Disney XD	DHX Media Vancouver; DHX Media		
Care Bears & Cousins	2015–16	Netflix	Splash Entertainment		
Buddy Thunderstruck	2017	Netflix	Stoopid Buddy Stoodios		
Holly Hobbie	2018–22	Hulu	Aircraft Pictures		
Tinpo	2018–19	CBeebies; TV Tokyo	Dentsu; Sprite Animation Studios; OLM Digital		
Care Bears: Unlock the Magic	2019–20	Boomerang	Copernicus Studios		
Boy Girl Dog Cat Mouse Cheese	2019–24	CBBC; Gulli; RTÉ; Canal J M6; Disney Channel	Watch Next Media; Kavaleer Productions; De Agostini		
Overlord and the Underwoods	2021–22	BYUtv; Nickelodeon; CBC	Marblemedia; Canfro Productions		
Pretty Freekin Scary	2023	Disney Channel; Disney+	KickStart Entertainment; Apt. 11H Productions; CakeStart Entertainment	Copyrighted to Disney Enterprises, Inc.	

=== Films ===
Title	Year(s)	Co-production with	Distributor	Format	Notes
The Care Bears Movie	1985	Nelvana	The Samuel Goldwyn Company	Theatrical release	Currently owned by Amazon MGM Studios
Care Bears Movie II: A New Generation	1986	Nelvana; LBS Communications	Columbia Pictures	Theatrical release	Currently owned by Sony Pictures
The Care Bears Adventure in Wonderland	1987	Nelvana	Cineplex Odeon Films	Theatrical release	
Care Bears Nutcracker Suite	1987	Nelvana	GoodTimes Home Video	TV movie (The Disney Channel), retitled Care Bears: The Nutcracker by Lionsgate in 2006	
Care Bears: Journey to Joke-a-lot	2004	Nelvana	Lions Gate Home Entertainment; Universal Pictures Video	Direct-to-video release	
The Care Bears' Big Wish Movie	2005	Nelvana	Lions Gate Home Entertainment	Direct-to-video release	
Strawberry Shortcake: The Sweet Dreams Movie	2006	DIC Entertainment Corporation	Kidtoon Films; 20th Century Fox Home Entertainment	Limited theatrical release	
Care Bears: Oopsy Does It!	2007	SD Entertainment; The Hatchery	Kidtoon Films; 20th Century Fox Home Entertainment	Limited theatrical release	
The Strawberry Shortcake Movie: Sky's the Limit	2009	MoonScoop Entertainment	20th Century Fox Home Entertainment	Direct-to-video release	
Care Bears: Share Bear Shines	2010	SD Entertainment	Kidtoon Films; Lionsgate Home Entertainment	Limited theatrical release, produced in 2009	
Strawberry Shortcake: The Berryfest Princess Movie	2010	MoonScoop Entertainment	20th Century Fox Home Entertainment	Direct-to-video release, produced in 2009	
Care Bears: To the Rescue	2010	SD Entertainment	Kidtoon Films; Lionsgate Home Entertainment	Limited theatrical release, produced in 2009	
Care Bears: The Giving Festival	2010	SD Entertainment	Lionsgate Home Entertainment	Direct-to-video release, produced in 2009	
Strawberry Shortcake: The Glimmerberry Ball Movie	2010	MoonScoop Entertainment	20th Century Fox Home Entertainment	Direct-to-video release, produced in 2009	
Care Bears: A Belly Badge for Wonderheart - The Movie	2013	MoonScoop Entertainment	Lionsgate Home Entertainment	Direct-to-video release, produced in 2012	
Untitled live-action/animated Care Bears film	TBA	Good Fear Content; GoldDay	Warner Bros. Pictures	Theatrical release	

=== Television and streaming specials ===
Title	Year(s)	Co-production with	Distributor	Format	Notes
The World of Strawberry Shortcake	1980	Muller/Rosen; Murakami-Wolf-Swenson; Toei Doga; RLR Associates	N/A		
Strawberry Shortcake in Big Apple City	1981	Muller/Rosen; Perpetual Motion Pictures; RLR Associates	N/A		
Strawberry Shortcake: Pets on Parade	1982	Muller/Rosen; Murakami-Wolf-Swenson; Toei Doga	N/A		
Strawberry Shortcake: Housewarming Surprise	1983	MAD Productions; Nelvana	N/A		
The Magic of Herself the Elf	1983	Nelvana; Scholastic	N/A		
The Care Bears in the Land Without Feelings	1983	Atkinson Film-Arts	N/A		
Strawberry Shortcake and the Baby Without a Name	1984	MAD Productions; Nelvana	N/A		
The Care Bears Battle the Freeze Machine	1984	Atkinson Film-Arts; MAD Productions	N/A		
The Get Along Gang	1984	Nelvana; Scholastic	N/A		
Strawberry Shortcake Meets the Berrykins	1985	Nelvana	N/A	limited theatrical release with The Care Bears Movie in some territories	
Peppermint Rose	1993	Muller Stratford Productions	N/A		
Holly Hobbie & Friends: Surprise Party	2006	Nickelodeon Animation Studio; Wang Film Productions	Nickelodeon; Paramount Home Entertainment		
Holly Hobbie & Friends: Christmas Wishes	2006	Nickelodeon Animation Studio; Wang Film Productions	Nickelodeon; Paramount Home Entertainment		
Holly Hobbie & Friends: Secret Adventures	2007	Nickelodeon Animation Studio; Wang Film Productions	Nickelodeon; Paramount Home Entertainment		
Holly Hobbie & Friends: Best Friends Forever	2007	Nickelodeon Animation Studio; Wang Film Productions	Nickelodeon; Sony Pictures Home Entertainment		
Buddy Thunderstruck: The Maybe Pile	2017	Stoopid Buddy Stoodios	Netflix	Interactive streaming special	
Care Bears: Unlock the Magic - The Quest for the Rainbow Stone	2023	Copernicus Studios	Max/Cartoonito	Aired in 2024 in most territories	
Care Bears: Unlock the Magic - Grumpy's Ginormous Adventure	2023	Copernicus Studios	Max/Cartoonito	Aired in 2024 in most territories	
Care Bears: Unlock the Magic - The Star of a Thousand Wishes	2023	Copernicus Studios	Max/Cartoonito	Aired in 2024 in most territories	
Care Bears: Unlock the Magic - The Bad Crowd Strikes Back!	2023	Copernicus Studios	Max/Cartoonito	Aired in 2024 in most territories	
Care Bears: Unlock the Magic - The Mystery of the Snickering Ghost	2023	Copernicus Studios	Max/Cartoonito	Aired in 2024 in most territories	
Care Bears: Unlock the Magic - The No Heart Games	2023	Copernicus Studios	Max/Cartoonito	Aired in 2024 in most territories	
The Care Berry Switch	TBA	WildBrain Studios	TBA	Crossover with Strawberry Shortcake	

=== Direct-to-video specials ===
Title	Year(s)	Co-production with	Distributor	Format	Notes
Madballs: Escape from Orb	1986	Nelvana	Hi-Tops Video	Direct-to-video release	
Madballs: Gross Jokes	1987	Nelvana	Hi-Tops Video	Direct-to-video release	
Strawberry Shortcake: Meet Strawberry Shortcake	2003	DIC Entertainment Corporation	20th Century Fox Home Entertainment (most territories)	Direct-to-video Release, produced in 2002	
Strawberry Shortcake: Spring for Strawberry Shortcake	2003	DIC Entertainment Corporation	20th Century Fox Home Entertainment (most territories)	Direct-to-video release, produced in 2002	
Strawberry Shortcake: Strawberry Shortcake's Get Well Adventure	2003	DIC Entertainment Corporation	20th Century Fox Home Entertainment (most territories)	Direct-to-video release, produced in 2002	
Strawberry Shortcake: Berry Merry Christmas	2003	DIC Entertainment Corporation	20th Century Fox Home Entertainment (most territories)	Direct-to-video release, produced in 2002	
Strawberry Shortcake: Adventures on Ice Cream Island	2004	DIC Entertainment Corporation	20th Century Fox Home Entertainment (most territories)	Direct-to-video release, produced in 2002	
Strawberry Shortcake: Best Pets Yet	2004	DIC Entertainment Corporation	20th Century Fox Home Entertainment (most territories)	Direct-to-video release	
Strawberry Shortcake: Play Day Surprise	2005	DIC Entertainment Corporation	20th Century Fox Home Entertainment (most territories)	Direct-to-video release, produced in 2004	
Strawberry Shortcake: Seaberry Beach Party	2005	DIC Entertainment Corporation	20th Century Fox Home Entertainment (most territories)	Direct-to-video release, produced in 2004	
Strawberry Shortcake: Moonlight Mysteries	2005	DIC Entertainment Corporation	20th Century Fox Home Entertainment (most territories)	Direct-to-video release, produced in 2004	
Strawberry Shortcake: Dress Up Days	2005	DIC Entertainment Corporation	20th Century Fox Home Entertainment (most territories)	Direct-to-video release, produced in 2004	
Strawberry Shortcake: World of Friends	2006	DIC Entertainment Corporation	20th Century Fox Home Entertainment (most territories)	Direct-to-video release, produced in 2005	
Strawberry Shortcake: Berry Fairy Tales	2006	DIC Entertainment Corporation	20th Century Fox Home Entertainment (most territories)	Direct-to-video release, produced in 2005	
Strawberry Shortcake: Cooking Up Fun	2006	DIC Entertainment Corporation	20th Century Fox Home Entertainment (most territories)	Direct-to-video release, produced in 2005	
Strawberry Shortcake: Berry Blossom Festival	2007	DIC Entertainment Corporation	20th Century Fox Home Entertainment (most territories)	Direct-to-video release, produced in 2005	
Strawberry Shortcake: Let's Dance	2007	DIC Entertainment Corporation	20th Century Fox Home Entertainment (most territories)	Direct-to-video release, produced in 2005	
Care Bears: Grizzle-ly Adventures	2008	SD Entertainment	20th Century Fox Home Entertainment (most territories)	Direct-to-video release, produced in 2007	
Strawberry Shortcake: Big Country Fun	2008	DIC Entertainment Corporation	20th Century Fox Home Entertainment (most territories)	Direct-to-video release, produced in 2007	
Care Bears: Ups and Downs	2008	SD Entertainment	20th Century Fox Home Entertainment	Direct-to-video release, produced in 2007	
Strawberry Shortcake: Rockaberry Roll	2008	DIC Entertainment Corporation	20th Century Fox Home Entertainment (most territories)	Direct-to-video release, produced in 2007	
Holly Hobbie & Friends: Fabulous Fashion Show	2008	Toon City Animation; Cartoonuity	Sony Pictures Home Entertainment	Direct-to-video release	
Holly Hobbie & Friends: Marvelous Makeover	2009	Toon City Animation; Cartoonuity	Sony Pictures Home Entertainment	Direct-to-video release	
Strawberry Shortcake: Happily Ever After	2009	DIC Entertainment Corporation	20th Century Fox Home Entertainment (most territories)	Direct-to-video release, produced in 2007	
Strawberry Shortcake: Berry Big Journeys	2009	DIC Entertainment Corporation	20th Century Fox Home Entertainment (most territories)	Direct-to-video release, produced in 2007	
Strawberry Shortcake: Berrywood, Here We Come!	2010	DIC Entertainment Corporation	20th Century Fox Home Entertainment (most territories)	Direct-to-video release, produced in 2007	
Strawberry Shortcake: Growing Up Dreams	2011	DIC Entertainment Corporation	20th Century Fox Home Entertainment (most territories)	Direct-to-video release, produced in 2004	
Strawberry Shortcake: Berry Brick Road	2012	DIC Entertainment Corporation	20th Century Fox Home Entertainment (most territories)	Direct-to-video release, produced in 2007	
