= The Twisted Whiskers Show =

Animated television series

- Genre: Comedy; Slapstick
- Based on: Characters by Terrill Bohlar
- Developed by: Margaret Loesch; Bill Kopp; Savage Steve Holland
- Directed by: Bill Kopp
- Voices of: Scott McNeil; David Kaye; Kathleen Barr; Peter Kelamis; Lee Tockar; Bill Kopp; Colin Murdock
- Theme music composer: Ryan Wiesbrock
- Composer: John W.F. Goode
- Countries of origin: United States; Canada
- Original language: English
- No. of seasons: 1
- No. of episodes: 26 (52 segments)

Production
- Executive producers: Tapaas Chakravarti; Jeffrey Conrad; Paul Cummins; Bill Schultz; Mike Young
- Producers: Sean Gorman; Ryan Wiesbrock
- Editor: Michael Bradley
- Running time: 22 minutes (11 minutes per short)
- Production companies: American Greetings Properties; DQ Entertainment; MoonScoop Entertainment; Telegael

Original release
- Network: The Hub (United States); CBBC (United Kingdom); Teletoon (Canada)
- Release: September 26, 2009 – March 1, 2010 (U.K.)
- Release: October 10 – December 1, 2010 (U.S.)

The Twisted Whiskers Show is an animated series based on the Twisted Whiskers greeting cards created by Terrill Bohlar for American Greetings. The series was produced by American Greetings Properties (and its related company CloudCo, Inc.), Telegael, DQ Entertainment and MoonScoop Entertainment.

The Twisted Whiskers Show first premiered on CBBC in the United Kingdom on September 26, 2009. Internationally, it aired on Teletoon in Canada, MTV3 Junior in Finland, Disney Channel in Japan, and on Cartoon Network in Latin America. In the United States, The Twisted Whiskers Show premiered on October 10, 2010, as the first program to air on the Hasbro/Discovery-owned children's network, The Hub (known today as Discovery Family). The series finale aired on December 1 of the same year. 52 11-minute segments were aired and produced.

== Characters ==
- Yawp (voiced by Scott McNeil) is a feisty little puppy. Despite his inability to talk, he is definitely not short on personality.
- Dander (voiced by David Kaye) is a cat who was used to "the good life", living with a woman who works in politics and foreign relations. Anything outside his kitty cat world is approached with a naïveté that gets him into trouble. Usually seen with his pal, Yawp, they are on a continuous saga to get back home after falling off a moving truck.
- Goosers (voiced by Scott McNeil) is a consummate yellow Labrador Retriever who is loyal and trustworthy. He usually has to deal with protecting his owner Claude (voiced by David Kaye) or something the man holds dear, from some strange occurrence.
- Von Ripper (voiced by Scott McNeil) is a shark-like guard dog with a silvery-gray coat, a spiked collar and a mouth full of nasty sharp teeth. He usually serves as an antagonist most of the time.
- Cutie Snoot (voiced by Kathleen Barr) is a little pink kitten who looks cute, but has an evil streak.
- Dine (voiced by Peter Kelamis) and Dash (voiced by Lee Tockar) are two streetwise alley cats with matching black and white "prison" stripes. Dine is the fast-talking leader, and Dash is the lovable dope. The two usually go to great lengths to get food, from stealing to conning.
- Zippy the Greyhound (voiced by Lee Tockar) is a retired racing dog who is shell-shocked from too many years on the track. The littlest sound causes him to bolt, usually into something painful.
- Mister Mewser (voiced by Bill Kopp) is a shut-in house cat with tuxedo markings who lives in a huge Victorian mansion, and the fate of its owners are never revealed. Seeing himself more as a sophisticated human, Mewser keeps mice as indentured servants and enjoys watching old Westerns. He and Smidgeon like each other more than either would like to admit.
- Smidgeon is Mister Mewser's little white mouse butler. He and Mewser like each other more than either would like to admit.
- Ird (voiced by Scott McNeil) is a blue jay with a deep voice. He makes a cameo in most episodes and serves as an antagonist in some.
- Sinister Squirrel (voiced by Scott McNeil) is a crazy squirrel identified by a chunk of fur missing from his tail. He is as an enemy to Goosers and a neighbor to Ird.
- Tiny Head (voiced by Colin Murdock) is a full-grown tabby cat with a kitten-sized head and is an eternal optimist whose talking often makes him oblivious to everything around him.
- Cambridge Kitty (voiced by Colin Murdock) is an alleyway psychologist, offering his scientific opinion to whoever comes for his guidance.
- Flouncie (voiced by Kathleen Barr) is a large dog with a self-image problem and wants a playmate, seeing herself to be dainty despite being strong enough to unknowingly kill any unfortunate animal she befriends.
- Gasper (voiced by Scott McNeil) is Tiny Head's pet goldfish and victim of his friend's unintentionally harmful tokens of kindness.
- Jack (voiced by Bill Kopp) is an intellectual Jack Russell Terrier with glasses, taking them off while in the presence of his owner.
- Broken Bear (voiced by Colin Murdock) is a brown bear whose tagging by wildlife authorities placed him under the delusion that he was abducted by aliens. As a result, Broken Bear expects the aliens to return so he can be taken again and serve them as their leader.
- Ird's Wife is a background character. She is a pink galah and also hates Sinister Squirrel so much.

== Series overview ==
Season	Episodes	Segments	Originally released	
Season	Episodes	Segments	First released	Last released
1	26	52	October 10, 2010 (U.S.); September 26, 2009 (U.K.)	December 1, 2010 (U.S.); March 1, 2010 (U.K.)

== Episodes ==
No.	Title	Written by	Storyboard by	Original air date
1a	"Goosers: High Wire High Jinks"	Bill Kopp	Kyle Menke, Rich Chidlaw and Guy Vasilovich	September 26, 2009 (U.K.); October 10, 2010 (U.S.)
1b	"Dine and Dash: Fish Market Frenzy"	Greg Grabianski	Lenord Robinson	September 26, 2009 (U.K.); October 10, 2010 (U.S.)
2a	"Goosers: Feline Fatale"	Tom Minton	Cynthia Petrovic	October 13, 2010 (U.S.)
2b	"Yawp and Dander: Lost"	Martin Olson	Eddie Fitzgerald	October 13, 2010 (U.S.)
3a	"Goosers: Love Hurts"	Greg Grabianski	Fred Reyes and Dan Kubat	October 15, 2010 (U.S.)
3b	"Goosers: Obey"	Bill Kopp	Andrew Austin	October 15, 2010 (U.S.)
4a	"Goosers: Attack of the Giant Mutant Bunny"	Tim Björklund	Kirk Hanson	October 16, 2010 (U.S.)
4b	"Mister Mewser: No Place Like Home"	Bill Kopp	Kyle Menke and Michael Diederich	October 16, 2010 (U.S.)
5a	"Dine and Dash: Bear with Us"	Martin Olson	Mike Milo	October 20, 2010 (U.S.)
5b	"Cutie Snoot: The Good, The Bad and the Cutie"	Tim Bjorklund	David Schwartz	October 20, 2010 (U.S.)
6a	"Yawp and Dander: Busted"	Ryan Wiesbrock	Kirk Hanson and David Schwartz	October 22, 2010 (U.S.)
6b	"Tiny Head: A Tiny Bed for a Tiny Head"	Mr. Lawrence	Cynthia Petrovic and Byron Vaughns	October 22, 2010 (U.S.)
7a	"Dine and Dash: Cold Case Caper"	Martin Olson	Cynthia Petrovic	October 25, 2010 (U.S.)
7b	"Dander: Leaf Me Alone"	Mr. Lawrence	Don Dougherty and Cynthia Petrovic	October 25, 2010 (U.S.)
8a	"Dine and Dash: Cambridge Kitty"	Mr. Lawrence	Kirk Hanson and Barry Caldwell	October 27, 2010 (U.S.)
8b	"Dine and Dash: Bubble Trouble"	Mr. Lawrence	Barry Caldwell	October 27, 2010 (U.S.)
9a	"Yawp and Dander: Food of the Dogs"	Martin Olson and Tim Bjorklund	Ken Mitchroney	October 29, 2010 (U.S.)
9b	"Mister Mewser: Dark and Stormy Night"	Bill Kopp	Michael Diederich	October 29, 2010 (U.S.)
10a	"Tiny Head: Quiet Time with Tiny Head"	Mike Ryan	Barry Caldwell	October 30, 2010 (U.S.)
10b	"Tiny Head: Fraidy Cat"	Martin Olson	Marc Schirmeister	October 30, 2010 (U.S.)
11a	"Broken Bear: Out to Launch"	Tim Bjorklund	David Prince	November 1, 2010 (U.S.)
11b	"Dine and Dash: Don't Fear the Ripper"	Tim Bjorklund	Don Dougherty and Cynthia Petrovic	November 1, 2010 (U.S.)
12a	"Tiny Head: Dad Blasted Varmints"	Bill Kopp and Tim Bjorklund	Hank Tucker and David Prince	November 3, 2010 (U.S.)
12b	"Zippy the Grey Hound: Flip the Script"	Tim Bjorklund	Tim Parsons and Kang Lin Zhu	November 3, 2010 (U.S.)
13a	"Tiny Head: The Whistling Ghost"	Bill Kopp	Michael Diederich	November 5, 2010 (U.S.)
13b	"Tiny Head: Last Wish Fish"	Martin Olson	Marc Schirmeister	November 5, 2010 (U.S.)
14a	"Goosers: Ticked Off"	Martin Olson	Kang Lin Zhu and Byron Vaughns	November 8, 2010 (U.S.)
14b	"Goosers: Marooned"	Mr. Lawrence	Hank Tucker	November 8, 2010 (U.S.)
15a	"Mister Mewser: Collegiate Kitties"	Mr. Lawrence	Barry Caldwell	November 9, 2010 (U.S.)
15b	"Dine and Dash: For the Birds"	Tim Bjorklund	Kyle Menke	November 9, 2010 (U.S.)
16a	"Goosers: The Jig is Up"	Bill Kopp and Tim Bjorklund	Kirk Hanson	November 10, 2010 (U.S.)
16b	"Goosers: The Irds"	Tim Bjorklund	Barry Caldwell	November 10, 2010 (U.S.)
17a	"Dander: Party Animals"	Mr. Lawrence	Ken Mitchroney	November 11, 2010 (U.S.)
17b	"Yawp and Dander: Twister Tyke"	Mr. Lawrence	David Prince	November 11, 2010 (U.S.)
18a	"Goosers: Brain Drain"	Martin Olson	Villamore M. Cruz Jr.	November 12, 2010 (U.S.)
18b	"Ird the Bird: Tree's a Crowd"	Gordon Bressack	Marc Schirmeister	November 12, 2010 (U.S.)
19a	"Dine and Dash: Muscle Mouse"	Mr. Lawrence	Villamore M. Cruz Jr. and Joe Garcia	November 16, 2010 (U.S.)
19b	"Zippy the Grey Hound: Mongrel of Modern Art"	Gordon Bressack	David Prince	November 16, 2010 (U.S.)
20a	"Mister Mewser: Mewser Faces Realty"	Bill Kopp	Mike Milo	November 19, 2010 (U.S.)
20b	"Tiny Head: Last Gasper"	Martin Olson and Mike Ryan	Sandra Frame	November 19, 2010 (U.S.)
21a	"Dine and Dash: The Big Tuna Sausage Heist"	Tim Bjorklund	Kirk Hanson	November 17, 2010 (U.S.)
21b	"Jack: House Breaker"	Bill Kopp and Mike Ryan	Ken Mitchroney	November 17, 2010 (U.S.)
22a	"Dine and Dash: Genie of the Lunchbox"	Martin Olson and Mike Ryan	Barry Caldwell	November 18, 2010 (U.S.)
22b	"Dine and Dash: Order of the Raised Leg"	Martin Olson	Ken Micherony, Cynthia Petrovic and Joe Garcia	November 18, 2010 (U.S.)
23a	"Mister Mewser: Mister Mewser's Holiday Spectacular"	Bill Kopp and Mr. Lawrence	Mike Milo	November 25, 2010 (U.S.)
23b	"Dine and Dash: Road Rage Racers"	Bill Kopp and Greg Grabianski	Marc Schirmeister	November 25, 2010 (U.S.)
24a	"Dander: Egg on Your Face"	Mr. Lawrence	Mike Milo	November 22, 2010 (U.S.)
24b	"Yawp: Big Hunka Love"	Tim Bjorklund	Brian Ray, Swarna Prasad and Sukanto Debnath	November 22, 2010 (U.S.)
25a	"Dander: To Scratch or Not to Scratch"	Mike Ryan	Marc Schirmeister	November 23, 2010 (U.S.)
25b	"Jack: Nice Dogs Finish Last"	Mike Ryan	David Prince	November 23, 2010 (U.S.)
26a	"Tiny Head: Nature's Call"	Bill Kopp and Mike Ryan	Marc Schirmeister	March 1, 2010 (U.K.); December 1, 2010 (U.S.)
26b	"Jack: The Masked Amigo"	Bill Kopp	Ken Micherony	March 1, 2010 (U.K.); December 1, 2010 (U.S.)

== International broadcast ==
- United States
  - The Hub (October 10, 2010 – February 28, 2014)
- United Kingdom
  - CBBC (2009–2010)
- Finland
  - MTV Juniori
- Hungary
  - Megamax
- India
  - Hungama TV
  - Sony YAY!
- Indonesia
  - Global TV
- Netherlands
  - NPO Zapp
  - NPO 1
  - NPO 2
  - NPO 3
- Belgium
  - Ketnet
  - Nickelodeon
  - Disney XD
- Latin America
  - Cartoon Network (February 8, 2010 – June 29, 2012)
  - Boomerang (2014–2016)
- Canada
  - Teletoon
- Middle East and North Africa
  - Jeem TV
- United Arab Emirates
  - E-Junior
- Japan
  - Disney Channel
- Australia
  - ABC Me
- Southeast Asia
  - Disney Channel
