= The Magic of Herself the Elf =

- Also known as: The Special Magic of Herself the Elf
- Genre: Animation; Family; Fantasy; Musical
- Written by: Diane Dixon
- Directed by: Raymond Jafelice
- Starring: Denny Dillon; Georgia Engel
- Music by: Judy Collins; Patricia Cullen
- Countries of origin: Canada; United States
- Original language: English

Production
- Executive producer: Jane Startz
- Producers: Michael Hirsh; Patrick Loubert; Clive A. Smith
- Editors: Cathy Hunt; Tom Joerin; Rob Kirkpatrick; Don Lauder
- Running time: 22 minutes
- Production companies: Nelvana Limited; Scholastic Entertainment; Those Characters from Cleveland

Original release
- Release: July 30, 1983

The Magic of Herself the Elf (also known by its on-screen title, The Special Magic of Herself the Elf) is an American animated television special that premiered in the United States on July 30, 1983 in broadcast syndication. The special was produced by the Canadian animation company, Nelvana Limited, Scholastic Entertainment, and Those Characters from Cleveland, and distributed by Lexington Broadcast Services.

Directed by John Celestri (credited under first name Gian) and Raymond Jafelice, it stars the voices of Jerry Orbach, Georgia Engel, Ellen Greene and Priscilla Lopez. The music was sung and performed, though not written, by Judy Collins. The special is based on the American Greetings/Mattel property, Herself the Elf, starring Priscilla Lopez. It was released once on video by Scholastic-Lorimar (a label of Karl-Lorimar Home Video). There are no further home video releases to date.

== Cast ==
- Denny Dillon as Meadow Morn (voice)
- Georgia Engel as Willow Song (voice)
- Ellen Greene as Creeping Ivy (voice)
- Terri Hawkes as Snow Drop (voice)
- Jim Henshaw as Wilfie - a Wood Sprite (voice)
- Priscilla Lopez as Herself the Elf (voice)
- Jerry Orbach as King Thorn (voice)
- Susan Roman as Wood Pink (voice)
