= Tinpo =

Children's animated television series

- Also known as: Team Tinpo; TinPo
- Written by: Davey Moore; Emma Hogan
- Directed by: Moto Sakakibara
- Composer: Oliver Spencer-Wortley
- Countries of origin: United States; Japan (TV series); United Kingdom (TV series)
- Original languages: English; Japanese; Welsh
- No. of seasons: 2
- No. of episodes: 78

Production
- Executive producers: Sean Gorman; Karen Vermeulen; Ryan Wiesbrock; Kiyofumi Kajiwara; Toshiaki Okuno
- Producers: Tomoe Kimura; Masashi Kobayashi; Junichi Yanagihara
- Running time: 1 minute (shorts); 7 minutes (TV series)
- Production companies: Shorts; American Greetings; TV series Cloudco Entertainment; Dentsu; Sprite Animation Studios; OLM Digital

Original release
- Network: CBS
- Release: 3 October 2007
- Network: CBeebies (UK); TV Tokyo (Japan)
- Release: 10 December 2018 – 19 November 2019

Tinpo (Japanese: ポータウンのなかまたち), (Welsh: Tîmpo) is a children's animated television series produced by Cloudco Entertainment, Dentsu, Sprite Animation Studios and OLM Digital for CBeebies.

The series originally ran as 1-minute online shorts on both CBS' KEWLopolis block as well as on The Hub.

The series began airing on TVOKids in Canada on 3 June 2019.

== Premise ==
The show features four colourful human-like creatures called The Team Tinpo, who fix problems with creative solutions.

== Characters ==
- Tinpo (Ross Grant): a blue member and the leader of Team Tinpo. He is a dreamer and a doer.
- Dougpo (Lizzie Waterworth-Santo): a yellow member of Team Tinpo. She boldly acts on gut and instinct.
- Logipo (Kevin Wickham): a reddish-orange member of Team Tinpo. He's cautious and by the book.
- Hackpo (Joanna Ruiz): a purple member of Team Tinpo. She heads up communication and invents deads gadgets.

The shorts were produced by American Greetings Entertainment (now Cloudco Entertainment).

The TV series adaptation of the shorts was announced by the successor of American Greetings' entertainment division Cloudco Entertainment (formerly American Greetings Entertainment) when British broadcaster CBeebies and Japanese broadcaster TV Tokyo jointly commissioned a new series based on the Tinpo shorts which was being produced by Cloudco Entertainment in partnership with Japanese entertainment companies Dentsu and Japanese animation studio OLM Digital who will animated the series alongside its American animation partner Sprite Animation Studios.

Lemonsky Studios provided additional outsourced service on the animation.
