= Herself the Elf =

Toy franchise

Herself the Elf was a franchise line for young girls similar to Strawberry Shortcake. It was created by American Greetings (through its "Those Characters From Cleveland" research-and-development unit). It included a series of dolls from Mattel, an animated special, books, and records.

== The Magic of Herself the Elf ==
The Magic of Herself the Elf is a 1983 American animated television special.

== Attempted revival ==
American Greetings announced plans in 2016 to revive Herself the Elf as an animated series, a co-production between Cloudco Entertainment and French studio Gaumont Animation. The relaunch never got off the ground.
