= Sprite Animation Studios =

American animation studio

- Company type: Privately held
- Industry: CG Animation
- Founded: 2002; 24 years ago
- Headquarters: Los Angeles, California, U.S.
- Key people: Motonori Sakakibara; Junichi Yanagihara
- Owner: Imagica Group
- Number of employees: 4 (March 2023)
- Parent: OLM, Inc.
- Website: www.spriteanimation.com

Sprite Animation Studios is an American computer animation studio founded in 2002 by former members of Square USA led by Motonori "Moto" Sakakibara, co-director of Square Pictures and Columbia Pictures’ feature film Final Fantasy: The Spirits Within. The studio specializes in the design and creation of 3D computer animation for film and television productions, video games, and commercial advertising, and its short productions have screened at the Annecy International Animated Film Festival, the SIGGRAPH Electronic Theater, the Ottawa International Animation Festival, and other venues.

In 2009, Sprite entered into a partnership with OLM, Inc., a famous Japanese animation studio, producer of the Pokémon anime.

== Television series ==
- Pac-Man and the Ghostly Adventures (2013–2015) (co-production Arad Productions, 41 Entertainment, Bandai Namco Entertainment, and OLM Digital)
- Yo-Kai Watch (2015–2018) (co-production with OLM Digital)
- Kong: King of the Apes (2016–2018) (co-production Arad Animation, 41 Entertainment and OLM Digital)
- Tinpo (2018–2019) (co-production with Cloudco Entertainment, CBeebies, Dentsu and OLM Digital)
- Hot Wheels Let's Race (2024–2025) (co-production with Mattel Television and OLM Digital)

== Films ==
- Yo-kai Watch: The Movie (2016)
- Pokémon: Mewtwo Strikes Back – Evolution (2019)
