= Care Bears & Cousins =

American animated television series

- Directed by: Andrew Young
- Voices of: Olivia Hack; Doug Erholtz; Braeden Fox; David Lodge; Patty Mattson; Stephanie Sheh; Ryan Wiesbrock
- Theme music composer: Chip Whitewood; Elizabeth Ashley Gerrard
- Opening theme: "Care Bears & Cousins"
- Ending theme: "Care Bears & Cousins" (instrumental)
- Composers: Richard Evans; Chip Whitewood
- Country of origin: United States
- Original language: English
- No. of seasons: 2
- No. of episodes: 12

Production
- Executive producers: Sean Gorman; Ryan Wiesbrock
- Producers: Liz Young; Mike Young; Nicolas Atlan
- Running time: 22 minutes
- Production companies: American Greetings; American Greetings Properties

Original release
- Network: Netflix
- Release: November 6, 2015 – February 5, 2016

Related
- Care Bears: Welcome to Care-a-Lot; Care Bears: Unlock the Magic

Care Bears & Cousins is an American children's animated adventure television series released on November 6, 2015, on Netflix. Produced by American Greetings Properties and animated by Splash Entertainment, (Note: Animation outsourced to Xentrix Studios.) the series is a continuation of the previous series Care Bears: Welcome to Care-a-Lot, re-introduces four of the Care Bear cousins - Brave Heart Lion, Bright Heart Raccoon, Lotsa Heart Elephant and Cozy Heart Penguin. The series was removed from Netflix on November 6, 2025, exactly 10 years after the show first premiered.

== Synopsis ==
Set in Care-a-Lot, a magical land in the clouds, Tenderheart Bear, Cheer Bear, Grumpy Bear, Share Bear, Harmony Bear, Funshine Bear and new playful, curious cub Wonderheart Bear go on adventures that emphasize morals of caring and sharing. Human children from Earth often visit Care-a-Lot and participate in new adventures and learn valuable lessons. The Care Bears' mischievous frenemy King Beastly often attempts to make trouble for the bears.

== Characters ==
=== Main Care Bears ===
- Tenderheart Bear (voiced by David Lodge)
- Cheer Bear (voiced by Patty Mattson)
- Funshine Bear (voiced by Michael Sinterniklaas)
- Grumpy Bear (voiced by Doug Erholtz)
- Harmony Bear (voiced by Nayo Wallace)
- Share Bear (voiced by Stephanie Sheh)
- Wonderheart Bear (voiced by Michaela Dean)

=== Cousins ===
- Brave Heart Lion (voiced by Braeden Fox)
- Bright Heart Raccoon (voiced by Ryan Wiesbrock)
- Lotsa Heart Elephant (voiced by Olivia Hack)
- Cozy Heart Penguin (voiced by Michael Sinterniklaas)

=== Other Care Bears ===
- Amigo Bear
- Best Friend Bear
- Birthday Bear
- Good Luck Bear
- Love-a-Lot Bear
- Secret Bear
- Surprise Bear (voiced by Melissa Mable)
- Thanks-a-Lot Bear
- Wish Bear (voiced by Melissa Mable)

=== Other Care-a-Lot Residents ===
- King Beastly (voiced by Doug Erholtz)

== Episodes ==
=== Series overview ===
Season	Episodes	
Season	Episodes	Originally released
1	6	November 6, 2015
2	6	February 5, 2016

=== Season 1 (2015) ===
No. overall	No. in season	Title	Written by	Original release date
1	1	"Take Heart"	Amy Keating Rogers	November 6, 2015
The Care Bear Cousins return to Care-a-Lot and showcase their lessons in Care Hearts.
2	2	"Return to Tender"	Amy Keating Rogers	November 6, 2015
Tenderheart and Wonderheart are split away from each other when Wonderheart splits away from home.
3	3	"The Bright Stuff"	Amy Keating Rogers	November 6, 2015
Beastly steals the Cousins' ship, and it's up to Bright Heart Raccoon to save it and the Share Cloud.
4	4	"The Share Shack"	Dave Polsky	November 6, 2015
After building a Snack Shack, The Cousins and the Bears end up competing to see whose shack is the best.
5	5	"Belly Badgered"	Dayla Kennedy	November 6, 2015
Beastly attempts to ruin the Belly Badge Bonanza after being left out of the events.
6	6	"Wonder's Heart"	Chara Campanella	November 6, 2015
Wonderheart's Belly Badge Power has unleashed itself, and the Cousins wonder when it's needed the most.

=== Season 2 (2016) ===
No. overall	No. in season	Title	Written by	Original release date
7	1	"BFFs"	Guy Toubes	February 5, 2016
A jealous Harmony attempts to get back at her best friend, Share Bear when she starts playing with someone else during a picnic.
8	2	"Wishing Well"	Jennifer Muro & Amy Keating Rogers	February 5, 2016
Lotsa Heart Elephant accidentally causes a night-time problem when one of Wish Bear's Wishes goes wrong for her.
9	3	"Awesomest Day Ever"	Dave Polsky	February 5, 2016
Brave Heart Lion attempts to have a fun day with two of his friends at the same time, but finds that it's more trouble than he thought.
10	4	"Share Air"	Guy Toubes	February 5, 2016
Harmony makes a new song, which Share shares to the whole of Care-a-Lot before it's finished.
11	5	"Nurture Is Her Nature"	Dave Polsky	February 5, 2016
Lotsa-Heart Elephant accidentally injures Grumpy, and attempts to heal him.
12	6	"Beastly Bungalow"	Guy Toubes	February 5, 2016
Beastly and Share have trouble operating snack bars right next to each other.
