= Maryoku Yummy =

American animated television series

- Genre: Children's
- Created by: Jeffrey Conrad
- Opening theme: "Maryoku Yummy Main Title" by Saint Etienne and Ian Catt
- Ending theme: "Maryoku Yummy End Title" by Saint Etienne and Ian Catt
- Composers: Saint Etienne and Ian Catt
- Country of origin: United States
- Original language: English
- No. of series: 1
- No. of episodes: 26 (52 segments)

Production
- Executive producers: Jeffrey Conrad; Sarah Finn; David Avoy Stein; Tapaas Chakravarti; Paul Cummins
- Running time: 20 minutes
- Production companies: American Greetings; American Greetings Properties; DQ Entertainment; Telegael

Original release
- Network: The Hub
- Release: October 11 – November 15, 2010

Maryoku Yummy is an American children's animated television series that premiered on The Hub from October 11 to November 15, 2010. Produced by American Greetings Properties, DQ Entertainment and Telegael, it is based on the 2001 greeting card character, Maryoku Yummy. The show's intellectual property was created by Jeffrey Conrad of American Greetings. The show's production began in 2007 with a deal with DQ Entertainment. 26 episodes were produced.

== Premise ==
Maryoku Yummy is set in a whimsical world known as Nozomu. It is populated by the Yummy, and small creatures called wishes, the latter from children which are sent here and become granted by Wish Sitters. A trio of Wish Sitters, Maryoku, Ooka and Fij Fij, assists their wishes to become true. So far the only wish not granted, but lives in Nozomu with the Yummy, is a yellow and blue wish by the name of Fudan who, unlike most wishes, can talk.

== Characters ==
=== Main ===
- Maryoku: The main protagonist. She is a scarlet-pink yummy with yellow spiral antennae and a yellow spiral tail. She makes sure all wishes are loved, encouraged, and cared for and is always there to help anyone, especially her friends.
- Ooka: Maryoku's best friend. She is a blue-green yummy with green pigtails. She would rather take the day off than work, which usually gets her into trouble, but she does know how to have fun.
- Fij Fij: Maryoku's other best friend. He is a yellow yummy with a pink nose. He is extremely shy and very cautious. Luckily, Maryoku is there to bring him out of his shell. He also seems to have a crush on Maryoku.
- Hadagi: The leader of another Wish-Sitting team. She is a purple yummy with yellow star antennae. Hadagi is sometimes bossy and jealous of Maryoku at times. She can also get very competitive, but she can also be friendly at times.
- Bob: The Yummies' wish deliverer, who is yellow and wears a wish hat. He can deliver wishes to Nozomu very fast. He also provides a sense of humor while on his job.
- Shika: The Yummies' chief officer, who is blue with a green hat. He knows all about the rules, and often gets cranky when someone doesn't obey them.
- Nonki: Nozomu's resident inventor; he is teal and wears a construction hat. He is really smart and can fix almost anything. He's the taller one who barely says a word. When he does, it's usually "yup" or "nope".
- Yuzu: Nonki's best friend; he is a yellow and white with a green leaf antennae. He also likes to invent, but sometimes messes up. He's also the shorter one who usually speaks.

=== Supporting ===
- Omoshi: Nozomu's resident chef; he is green with a chef's hat. He doesn't use recipes from a recipe book, rather making up some of his own.
- Tapo Tapo: The Yummies' leader who is blue with a yellow spiral antennae. He's very wise and always helps out the Yummies when they're stuck.
- Fudan: A yellow and blue ungranted wish who lives with Tapo Tapo. He's Maryoku's favorite wish.
- Enro: The Yummies' fitness teacher and coach; she is orange and yellow and wears a whistle that makes various different sounds rather than a whistle sound when she blows it. She teaches the wishes to exercise and usually helps Maryoku when she can't get a wish to listen.
- Zuno: The Yummies' wish doctor; she is red and wears a doctor's mirror. According to Maryoku, she can help anyone feel better whenever they are sick before you can say "Yurble Burble".
- Mabui: Shika's assistant who is pink with a yellow eggshell antennae. Her singing makes Shika dance along.
- Jeppy: Omoshi's assistant who is orange with a yellow striped tail. He talks with a French accent.
- Oolong: Hadagi's assistant who is orange with a yellow star tail. He can't speak, but he can still communicate through body language and facial expressions. He's also the biggest and strongest yummy, but caring.
- Baburu: A blue member of Hadagi's wish-sitting team. She lives in a bubble and has a good sense of humor. She's also sarcastic and often acts as a voice of reason for Hadagi when Maryoku isn't around.
- Bishu: Tapo Tapo's flying assistant who is purple with pink antennae. She watches over the community and is always willing to know what's up to date.
- Inu: Fij Fij's pet. A small, dog-like Yummy who is blue and white. He is very playful and friendly to everybody. He also likes to fetch Shika's hat.

== Voice cast ==
- Shannon Chan-Kent
- Brian Drummond
- Maryke Hendrikse
- Donny Lucas
- Scott McNeil
- Cathy Weseluck
- Chiara Zanni

== Episodes ==
No.	Title	Original release date	Prod. code
1	"Wishless in Nozomu / The Biggest Wish"	October 11, 2010	101
One ungranted wish named Fudan remains in Nozomu when the wish delivery Bob does not arrive, so Maryoku and Shika look for him in places in Nozomu, like under the big red rock. Everyone eventually helps him get unstuck from a big wish blocking the entrance to nozomu; Hadagi volunteers to handle the big wish all by herself.
2	"No Left Feet / Ready, Set, Grow!"	October 12, 2010	102
Fij Fij is nervous about Maryoku's plans for a dance. So she helps him by making him dance on the dance floor; Hadagi hopes to earn praise by winning the annual Wishketball competition.
3	"Shika's Wish / Ookas Just Wanna Have Fun"	October 13, 2010	103
Shika's wish for Maryoku to follow the rules comes true. She then starts wearing Shika's hat and acting like him, making the others think she's not fun anymore and Shika regrets this; Ooka has to plant some melons when she wants to fly her kite, but Maryoku helps her make planting the melons fun.
4	"Sound Advice / Stealing Wishes"	October 14, 2010	104
Ooka and Hadagi each come up with a song that makes the wishes and Fij Fij sleep and dance at the same time; Shika accuses Maryoku and her wishes for stealing, but little does he know, it's actually a scavenger hunt for his birthday party.
5	"Fij Fij and the Fib Fib / Now You're Cooking!"	October 15, 2010	105
Fij Fij is followed by Nozomu's wishes after he steals a Yurble Burble Berry from Omoshi's kitchen; Maryoku and Omoshi switch jobs.
6	"Wishy Washy / Do You Know the Muffin, Man?"	October 18, 2010	106
Maryoku helps a stinky Wish who doesn't like baths get cleaned up; Jeppy eats all of Omoshi's muffins by mistake and blames it on a pretend monster.
7	"Lost and Confound / Doggone Dog"	October 19, 2010	107
Maryoku looks for Shika's rulebook after it goes missing while in her possession; Fudan pet sits for Fij Fij and finds that it's not all fun and games.
8	"Under Pressure / Wishling Rivalry"	October 20, 2010	108
Ooka is a bad influence on Maryoku & Fij Fij when they go exploring with Bob's van in the middle of nowhere, which causes them to get lost. They eventually reverse the van to go back home; Fudan feels jealous of a new baby Wish that commands Maryoku's attention, so he disguises himself as the baby wish.
9	"Promises, Promises / The Muddle Puddle"	October 21, 2010	109
Ooka promises to get Fudan to leave Nozomu forever, whether he wants to or not. They try to do everything a wish needs to be granted. Soon, Ooka gives up, so she pretends Fudan has become granted by making him eating a Burbleberry, But he flies away in the bubble he blows with the Burbleberry he ate, so Ooka is forced to go find him; a muddle-puddle storm touches Maryoku right before Nozomu's annual picnic. So Fij Fij and Ooka try to get her back.
10	"The Yorglesclubber / Someone Better"	October 22, 2010	110
Maryoku reassures the Wishes and Fij Fij after Ooka frightens them with a scary story about a monster called the Yorglesclubber. She goes outside & makes sure there ARE no monsters in Nozomu, but spooky noises scare her so much that she gets covered in mud & various plants, making her look like the Yorglesclubber; Fij Fij thinks he needs to change if he wants to stay Maryoku's friend.
11	"A Day Without Maryoku / Rise and Shine, Ooka"	October 25, 2010	111
Tapo Tapo demonstrates life to Shika without Maryoku; Ooka is tired after staying up too late.
12	"The Ninth Wish / The Best, Best Friend"	October 26, 2010	112
Shika has strong reactions to a ninth wish on Maryoku's team, but he soon warms up to it; Ooka and Fij Fij compete to be Maryoku's best friend.
13	"All The Colors of the Rainbow / No Rule Like an Old Rule"	October 27, 2010	113
Maryoku decides to teach Ooka & Hadagi about acceptance after they make different clubs; the Yummies break Shika's rules after he gets trapped in a bubble and later learn why rules exist.
14	"Hiccles / Opposite Day"	October 28, 2010	114
Ooka has to do everyone else's chores after they all get the Hiccles; a mysterious yellow and blue wish makes everyone act different.
15	"Scatterday / The Golden Flower"	October 29, 2010	115
A flashback where Fij Fij gets a dog-Yummy named Inu, but isn't quite ready for the responsibility; Maryoku tells the wishes a story about the Golden Flower of Fun & sets out to confirm the legend of it.
16	"Bored Games / Mother of an Invention"	November 1, 2010	116
When it's Shika's turn to pick a game for game day, everyone dreads it, but then Maryoku livens things up by having everyone play a game called "Shika says"; Nonki and Yuzu's wish delivery machine goes awry.
17	"Faster Than a Speeding Ooka / Mixing It Up"	November 2, 2010	117
Ooka learns an important lesson about the needs of the wishes after trying to grant them quickly by machine; Bob tries to do too much and neglects his primary task of delivering the wishes, so they run away.
18	"Ooka's Day Off / Flip, Flop and Float"	November 3, 2010	118
While on a day off, Ooka learns to appreciate helping others; Maryoku's antennae start growing at an unusual rate, making her sick, but she ignores this to help her friends.
19	"Don't Get Your Blooms in a Twist / Dream a Little Dream"	November 4, 2010	119
Shika accidentally picks Maryoku's flowers for Tapo Tapo; Maryoku wishes all of her friends Sweet Dreams to alleviate the stress of a difficult day.
20	"Build a Better Swingset / Ooka Times Two"	November 5, 2010	120
After the wishes' playground breaks, Tapo Tapo suggests the Yummies work together to make a new one, but they all have their own ideas on what they want it to be like; Ooka uses a look-alike robot built by Nonki and Yuzu to do her chores for her and later regrets it when the robot gets phrased for it.
21	"So Long, Oolong / Cinderoku"	November 8, 2010	121
Oolong tries to prove his worth to Nozumu despite Hadagi's opinion, so she sends him away; Tapo Tapo tells the wishes a story about Maryoku (Cinderoku) and Ooka (The Fairy Yum-Mother) in a setup of Cinderella.
22	"Yumtastic Voyage / Burbleberry Surprise"	November 9, 2010	122
Maryoku and Fij Fij go on a journey to save a lost wish who got lost inside Shika's hat; Ooka tries to take shortcuts while cooking her first recipe but everything goes wrong when Maryoku & Fij Fij start talking backwards after they eat it.
23	"Hats Off to Shika / Maryoku and the Huzzle Beanstalk"	November 10, 2010	123
Shika feels inadequate without his lucky hat; in a story Tapo Tapo tells to the wishes, the Yummies meet a giant Nonki in an adventure reminiscent of "Jack and the Beanstalk".
24	"Fij Fij the Almighty / It's a Yumderful Life"	November 11, 2010	124
Fij Fij's perfectionist streak causes trouble as he is chosen to run the Burble Blossom Festival; Maryoku learns to appreciate her life when she gains an understanding of how things could be if she were not a wish-sitter.
25	"Oodles of Yumdoodles / Rules Paradise"	November 12, 2010	125
Ooka borrows Fij Fij's new Yumdoodle bug without permission; Shika lets everyone add one new rule to the Nozomu rule book, but too many new rules cause trouble for everyone. Later, Maryoku adds a rule about treating others how you want to be treated, fixing everything.
26	"Ha! Ha! Hadagi! / Detective Ooka"	November 15, 2010	126
Maryoku steps in when Hadagi's practical jokes go too far; Ooka feels Maryoku has been unjustly accused for ruining her art show and comes to her defense. She later solves the mystery of who ruined the art show and finds out that she ruined it by leaving her art supplies out.

== Music ==
The theme song and soundtrack to this show was recorded by British indie band Saint Etienne.
