= Pretty Freekin Scary =

American television series

- Official release poster
- Genre: Comedy; Fantasy; Horror
- Created by: Jason P. Hauser
- Based on: Characters created by Cloudco Entertainment
- Showrunner: Jessica Kaminsky
- Starring: Eliana Su'a; Kyan Samuels; Leah Mei Gold; Yonas Kibreab; Emma Shannon
- Country of origin: United States
- Original language: English
- No. of seasons: 1
- No. of episodes: 20

Production
- Executive producers: Jessica Kaminsky; Kory Lunsford; Loris Kramer Lunsford; Sean Gorman; Ian Lambur; Ryan Wiesbrock; Edward Galton; Jason Netter
- Producer: Craig Wyrick-Solari
- Editor: Dave O'Brien
- Camera setup: Multi-camera
- Running time: 24–25 minutes
- Production companies: Cloudco Entertainment; Kickstart Entertainment; Apt. 11H Productions; CakeStart Entertainment

Original release
- Network: Disney Channel
- Release: June 15 – August 18, 2023

Pretty Freekin Scary is an American fantasy horror comedy television series created by Jason P. Hauser and produced as a co-production between Cloudco Entertainment, Kickstart Entertainment, Apt. 11H Productions and CakeStart Entertainment. It aired on Disney Channel from June 15 to August 18, 2023.

Based on Cloudco Entertainment's property of the same name, the series stars Eliana Su'a, Kyan Samuels, Leah Mei Gold, Yonas Kibreab, and Emma Shannon. In June 2024, the series was cancelled after one season.

== Premise ==
14-year-old Frankie Ripp has a great life until she suddenly gets killed in a freak accident where she fell into a manhole. In the Underworld, she has a heated debate with the Grim Reaper who lets her return home as long as her Underworld guardians Pretty and Scary accompany her. Frankie tries to keep the Grim Reaper a secret from everyone, while at the same time she must work for the Grim Reaper by completing a series of given tasks should she wish to keep her life.

== Cast ==
=== Main ===
- Eliana Su'a as Frankie, a 14-year-old teenager who came back from the dead, and the assistant to the Grim Reaper.
- Kyan Samuels as Pretty, one of Frankie's bodyguards who is constantly cheerful. He has the ability to heal people.
- Leah Mei Gold as Scary, Frankie's other bodyguard who is moody and sullen. She has the ability to freeze time.
- Yonas Kibreab as Remy, Frankie's younger brother and the only one aware of the Grim Reaper's presence, leader of the S.W.E.A.T.I. club.
- Emma Shannon as Nyx, an emo gothic teen who believes in the supernatural, who becomes Frankie's new best friend. She is revealed to be Principal Peppers' daughter in "Locker Life."

=== Recurring ===
- Napiera Groves Boykin as Mrs. Ripp, Frankie's mother; her first name is revealed to be Wendi in "My Soul-Called Life."
- Shawn Carter Peterson as Mr. Ripp, Frankie's father; his first name is revealed to be Jonathan in "Back to Life."
- Siobhan Murphy as the Grim Reaper, the ruler of the Underworld whom Frankie works for if she wants to stay alive.
- Dennis Cockrum as Theodore, Erlic's great-grandfather. He is the main antagonist and the adversary to Frankie and her friends.
- Jackson Dollinger as Dio, Frankie's other friend who started dating Layla after Frankie's death.
- Adora Sheikh as Layla, Frankie's former best friend who started dating Dio after Frankie's death. Her last name is revealed to be Mueller in "Back to Life."
- Yuvi Hecht as Erlic, Frankie's crush and the great-grandson of Theodore Snickering.
- Lisa Arch as Principal Peppers, the principal of Snickering Willows Middle School, who is Nyx's mother.
- Beth Curry as Ms. Hendricks, the English and history teacher at Snickering Willows Middle School. Her first name is revealed to be Barbara in "Locker Life."
- Christopher Darga as Mr. Aston, the science teacher at Snickering Willows Middle school, who runs the debate club.
- Tristan Michael Brown as Carson, Remy's best friend who has a crush on Nyx.
- Finn Carr as Brian, Scary's crush who says the word "dude" in almost every sentence.

== Production ==
Pretty Freekin Scary was initially a product range produced by American Greetings subsidiary AG Properties that was first announced as early as June 2006. The franchise debuted as an accessory line sold in Walmart stores during the 2007 Halloween season.

On October 13, 2022, Disney Channel gave a 20-episode series order to Pretty Freekin Scary, which premiered on June 15, 2023. The series is created by Jason P. Hauser and produced by CakeStart Entertainment and Cloudco Entertainment. Hauser only serves as a co-executive producer alongside Nancy Cohen and Jim & Steve Armogida, while Jessica Kaminsky serves as executive producer and showrunner, with additional executive producers including Kory Lunsford, Loris Kramer Lunsford, Sean Gorman, Ian Lambur, Ryan Wiesbrock, Edward Galton, and Jason Netter.

On June 30, 2024, it was announced that the series was cancelled after one season.

== Episodes ==
No.	Title	Directed by	Written by	Original release date	Prod. code
1	"Back to Life"	Wendy Faraone	Teleplay by : Jason P. Hauser	June 15, 2023	101
Frankie Ripp is living her best life with her family and boyfriend. That is, until she accidentally falls down a manhole and passes away. She is sent to the Underworld where she is greeted by Pretty, a cheerful receptionist in the Underworld. His colleague, Scary is a moody exit usher who hands people a key and watches their fate. Confused, Frankie rings a bell and the Grim Reaper herself appears. The Grim Reaper admits that Frankie is not actually supposed to be in the Underworld due to a mishap. She allows Frankie to return to life, as long as Pretty and Scary are her Underworld guardians. Frankie returns home, with her parents and younger brother, Remy overjoyed to see her back to life. The next day, Frankie goes back to school, along with Pretty and Scary enrolling as foreign exchange students. To her dismay, Frankie finds out that her boyfriend, Dio started dating her former best friend, Layla after she died. At lunch, Frankie accidentally spills a milkshake on herself, causing her to stress out. The stress ultimately causes her newly discovered wind powers to kick in. The wind stops once her new friend, Nyx tells everyone to get over it. After school, a package with the initials "GR" is addressed to Frankie, which Remy takes a look at. It turns out to be an Underworld contract from the Grim Reaper. Remy tells Frankie that the contract says she needs to complete a series of tasks for the Grim Reaper if she wants to stay alive. The Grim Reaper appears in her mirror, but does not explain the tasks just yet, telling her they will get there "all in due time." Guest stars: Napiera Groves Boykin as Mrs. Ripp, Shawn Carter Peterson as Mr. Ripp, Siobhan Murphy as Grim Reaper, Jackson Dollinger as Dio, Adora Sheikh as Layla, Yuvi Hecht as Erlic
2	"My Soul-Called Life"	Trevor Kirschner	Jason P. Hauser	June 15, 2023	105
Guest stars: Napiera Groves Boykin as Mrs. Ripp, Shawn Carter Peterson as Mr. Ripp, Siobhan Murphy as Grim Reaper, Dennis Cockrum as Theodore Absent: Emma Shannon as Nyx
3	"Life of the Party"	Wendy Faraone	Jessica Kaminsky	June 23, 2023 (Note: This episode was first released on Disney+ on June 16, 2023.)	102
Weeks after coming back to life, Frankie still feels like everyone views her differently. Her parents see this and want to throw her a "welcome back" surprise party, which Pretty accidentally spoils. Frankie agrees to the idea because it would be a great way to reconnect with her friends, especially Layla. Earlier in the day, Frankie gave Layla a chocolate chip muffin, which she declines because her favorite flavor is actually lemon poppy seed. At the party, Frankie gives a speech and her wind powers start to kick in, causing the cake that Mrs. Ripp made, to fly out of her hand and into the air. Frankie attempts to catch the cake, until Scary uses her powers to freeze time, resulting in Frankie falling to the ground. With his healing powers, Pretty heals Frankie's bruise that she got after she fell. After time unfreezes, Frankie catches the cake and quickly finishes her speech. Shortly after that, Layla reveals that she only came to the party because Mrs. Ripp called her mother. The two girls go outside and talk on the porch. It turns out that Layla just needed time to figure things out because she felt guilty and everything just became confusing after Frankie came back from the dead. Nyx hands Remy and Carson a stack of cash, telling them that an anonymous donor offered to purchase all of their S.W.E.A.T.I. merchandise at full price. Later, Nyx finds Frankie alone in the backyard and she still wishes everything could go back to normal. Nyx reassures her that things got way more interesting ever since she came back from the dead, which makes Frankie feel a lot better. At the end, Erlic puts on a S.W.E.A.T.I. beanie, revealing that he was the anonymous donor. Guest stars: Napiera Groves Boykin as Mrs. Ripp, Shawn Carter Peterson as Mr. Ripp, Siobhan Murphy as Grim Reaper, Jackson Dollinger as Dio, Adora Sheikh as Layla, Yuvi Hecht as Erlic, Tristan Michael Brown as Carson
4	"A New List on Life"	Danielle Fishel	Jonathan De Weerd & Paul David Smith	June 23, 2023	106
Guest stars: Napiera Groves Boykin as Mrs. Ripp, Shawn Carter Peterson as Mr. Ripp, Alyssa Brooke as Lindsay
5	"Locker Life"	Danielle Fishel	Steve Armogida & Jim Armogida	June 30, 2023	103
Guest stars: Siobhan Murphy as Grim Reaper, Adora Sheikh as Layla, Yuvi Hecht as Erlic, Beth Curry as Ms. Hendricks, Lisa Arch as Principal Peppers, Christopher Darga as Mr. Aston
6	"The Bro Life"	Jody Margolin Hahn	Nancy Cohen	June 30, 2023	104
Guest stars: Napiera Groves Boykin as Mrs. Ripp, Dennis Cockrum as Theodore, Jackson Dollinger as Dio, Adora Sheikh as Layla, Tristan Michael Brown as Carson, Finn Carr as Brian Absent: Emma Shannon as Nyx
7	"Lunch Life"	Morenike Joela Evans	Erica Eastrich	July 7, 2023	107
Guest stars: Lisa Arch as Principal Peppers, Tristan Michael Brown as Carson, Scarlett Cardone as Charlotte, Christopher Darga as Mr. Aston, Jackson Dollinger as Dio, Yuvi Hecht as Erlic, Ellen Ratner as Doris, Adora Sheikh as Layla
8	"The Power of Life"	Robbie Countryman	Jonathan De Weerd & Paul David Smith	July 7, 2023	108
Guest stars: Siobhan Murphy as Grim Reaper, Finn Carr as Brian
9	"Life as We Knew It"	Robbie Countryman	Jason P. Hauser	July 14, 2023	109
Guest stars: Napiera Groves Boykin as Mrs. Ripp, Shawn Carter Peterson as Mr. Ripp, Siobhan Murphy as Grim Reaper, Dennis Cockrum as Theordore, Yuvi Hecht as Erlic, Presley Richardson as Christine
10	"The Girl Most Likely to Come Back to Life"	Raven-Symoné	Erica Eastrich	July 14, 2023	110
Guest stars: Shawn Carter Peterson as Mr. Ripp, Siobhan Murphy as Grim Reaper, Yuvi Hecht as Erlic, John Michael Higgins as Harold DuBois
11	"Streak Life"	Danielle Fishel	Nancy Cohen	July 21, 2023	111
Guest stars: Shawn Carter Peterson as Mr. Ripp, Siobhan Murphy as Grim Reaper, Dennis Cockrum as Theodore, Yuvi Hecht as Erlic, Beth Curry as Ms. Hendricks, Jackson Dollinger as Dio, Anthony Crivello as Sebastian
12	"That Sleepover Life"	Danielle Fishel	Alex Fox & Rachel Lewis	July 21, 2023	112
Guest stars: Napiera Groves Boykin as Mrs. Ripp, Shawn Carter Peterson as Mr. Ripp, Siobhan Murphy as Grim Reaper, Tristan Michael Brown as Carson, Finn Carr as Brian
13	"Birthday Life"	Jason Shipman	Miranda Bowden-Parker & Rochan Liu	July 28, 2023 (Note: This episode was first released on Disney+ on July 26, 2023.)	113
Guest stars: Napiera Groves Boykin as Mrs. Ripp, Shawn Carter Peterson as Mr. Ripp, Jackson Dollinger as Dio, Yuvi Hecht as Erlic, Austin Brady as Boba Bobby, Tristan Michael Brown as Carson, Finn Carr as Brian, Lisa Arch as Principal Peppers, Samantha Klein as Deborah
14	"A Matter of Life and Debate"	Wendy Faraone	Jonathan De Weerd & Paul David Smith	July 28, 2023	114
Guest stars: Napiera Groves Boykin as Mrs. Ripp, Shawn Carter Peterson as Mr. Ripp, Siobhan Murphy as Grim Reaper, Tristan Michael Brown as Carson, Finn Carr as Brian, Christopher Darga as Mr. Aston, Yuvi Hecht as Erlic Absent: Emma Shannon as Nyx
15	"Best Friends for Life"	Craig Wyrick-Solari	Alex Fox & Rachel Lewis	August 4, 2023	115
Guest stars: Napiera Groves Boykin as Mrs. Ripp, Lisa Arch as Principal Peppers, Tristan Michael Brown as Carson, Christopher Darga as Mr. Aston, Brandilyn Cheah as Lily, Beth Curry as Ms. Hendricks
16	"The Game of Life"	Robbie Countryman	Jessica Kaminsky	August 4, 2023	116
Guest stars: Napiera Groves Boykin as Mrs. Ripp, Shawn Carter Peterson as Mr. Ripp, Siobhan Murphy as Grim Reaper, Tristan Michael Brown as Carson, Dennis Cockrum as Theodore, Yuvi Hecht as Erlic, Anthony Crivello as Sebastian, Beth Curry as Ms. Hendricks, Presley Richardson as Christine, Christopher T. Wood as Tempurt
17	"Life's Rich Gumbo"	Trevor Kirschner	Steve Armogida & Jim Armogida	August 11, 2023	117
Guest stars: Napiera Groves Boykin as Mrs. Ripp, Shawn Carter Peterson as Mr. Ripp, Tristan Michael Brown as Carson, Lisa Arch as Principal Peppers, Yvette Cason as Maw-Maw, Beth Curry as Ms. Hendricks, Brett Rash as Tyler
18	"Life Under Control"	Jim Armogida	Steve Armogida & Jim Armogida	August 11, 2023	118
Guest stars: Napiera Groves Boykin as Mrs. Ripp, Shawn Carter Peterson as Mr. Ripp, Siobhan Murphy as Grim Reaper, Tristan Michael Brown as Carson, Dennis Cockrum as Theodore, Yuvi Hecht as Erlic
19	"Life at the End of the Tunnel"	Victor Gonzalez	Jessica Kaminsky	August 18, 2023	119
Guest stars: Siobhan Murphy as Grim Reaper, Dennis Cockrum as Theodore, Yuvi Hecht as Erlic, Tristan Michael Brown as Carson, Finn Carr as Brian, Christopher Darga as Mr. Aston
20	"Life and Death"	Victor Gonzalez	Jason P. Hauser	August 18, 2023	120
The kids are in Frankie's room recapping what they know about Theodore Snickering. Remy and Erlic make a copy of Theodore's conspiracy board, which contains pictures of all the kids' faces on it. Frankie is mad that the Grim Reaper never told her about any of this. She calls for Grim on various reflective surfaces. Mr. Ripp hears her talking to these objects and is concerned. Grim eventually appears on the toaster and tells her she will figure everything out. She tells Frankie that if they succeed at getting Theodore back to the Underworld, then Pretty and Scary will return to the Underworld. Mr. Ripp tells Mrs. Ripp about what he saw and she said she saw Frankie talking to herself in the mirror. They both think it's a phase. Christine appears in Theodore's mirror and gives him an orb that takes away Grim's powers. The kids reconvene in the backyard and they need to break the talisman into multiple pieces to split between everyone. Nyx and Remy are struggling breaking the stone, so Frankie uses her lightning powers to break it apart, revealing her powers to Erlic. They make bracelets with the stone from everyone for when they go to the Snickering mansion to protect themselves from Theodore's mind control powers. Theodore uncovers his mirror and calls for Grim. She comes out to try and take the Book of Souls page from him and tries to zap him back to the Underworld. Her powers don't work, due to Theodore having the orb that drains her powers and she freezes. Frankie and the kids go into the Snickering mansion to look for the Book of Souls page, but they have no luck. Frankie finds it weird that Theodore has a mirror, since he doesn't use reflective surfaces. Remy uncovers a frozen Grim Reaper, who he thinks is a statue until the other kids yell out her name. Mr. and Mrs. Ripp start snooping in Frankie's room to look for clues and they come across the Underworld contract in her drawer. The kids confront Theodore for everything he's been doing in this town. Theodore attempts to use his mind control power, but fails since they all have matching talismans. Scary and Pretty attempt to use their powers to unfreeze Grim, but fail. Frankie, Pretty, and Scary all work together and focus all their thoughts and energies on Grim. This causes an earthquake that causes the orb to fall out of Theodore's hands and it unfreezes Grim. Mrs. Ripp reads the part in the contract that says if Frankie doesn't complete a series of tasks for the Grim Reaper, she'll be sent back to the Underworld. She remembers that Frankie was going to Erlic's house and thinks she's in trouble and rushes over there with Mr. Ripp. Grim thanks the kids for saving her and asks them to clear the room, so that Theodore can be sent back to the Underworld. The kids go to the porch and find Mr. and Mrs. Ripp there. They admit that they found the Underworld contract when they were snooping in her room. Mrs. Ripp wants to give the Grim Reaper a piece of her mind, but Frankie tells her that the contract doesn't matter anymore since she's completed all the tasks. Erlic says one final goodbye to his great-grandfather. When Grim isn't looking, Theodore places Erlic's hand on her. This results in Erlic being sent to the Underworld instead of Theodore. Frankie, Pretty, and Scary come home and Frankie decides to ask Grim for more tasks so Pretty and Scary can stay with her. When Frankie calls for Grim in her mirror, Christine appears instead, telling her that getting Erlic back is between Grim and the Underworld council. The kids agree that they need to solve this mishap themselves and with S.W.E.A.T.I.'s help, ending the series on a cliffhanger. Guest stars: Napiera Groves Boykin as Mrs. Ripp, Shawn Carter Peterson as Mr. Ripp, Siobhan Murphy as Grim Reaper, Dennis Cockrum as Theodore, Anthony Crivello as Sebastian, Yuvi Hecht as Erlic, Presley Richardson as Christine

== Release ==
Pretty Freekin Scary premiered on June 15, 2023 on Disney Channel. The first 7 episodes were released on Disney+ on June 16, 2023, resulting in episodes 3–7 being released prior to their televised premieres. Similarly, episodes 8–14 were added to Disney+ on July 26, 2023, with episodes 13 and 14 being released prior to their television debuts later that week.

The series was removed from Disney+ on September 27, 2024.
