= Madballs =

Series of toy rubber balls

- 1986 TV commercial title card for Madballs
- Type: Bouncy balls
- Invented by: AmToy
- Company: Cloudco Entertainment
- Country: United States
- Availability: 1986–present
- Materials: Rubber, foam
- Slogan: "Freaky fun for everyone!"
- Official website

Madballs is a series of toy foam balls originally created by AmToy, a subsidiary company of American Greetings (now Cloudco Entertainment), and first available in stores in 1986, later being revived by Art Asylum (2007–2008) and Just Play, Inc. (2017–2019). The balls incorporated gross-out humor and each was given a character synopsis and an odd name. The toyline expanded into a franchise with a comic book series, two direct-to-video animated cartoons, and a video game for the ZX Spectrum, Amstrad CPC, and Commodore 64.

== Overview ==
The toys were rubber or foam collectible bouncing balls with grotesque faces and designs. The toys sold well as a passing fad. There were two series of the original Madballs collectible toys. Each series consisted of eight balls, as well as a collection of Super Madballs, a larger version of the original Madballs shaped like other sports balls, such as the American football-shaped "Touchdown Terror," the soccer ball-shaped "Goal Eater," and the basketball-shaped "Foul Shot."

== Toys ==
=== Original series Madballs ===
- Screamin' Meemie: A screaming baseball with a large tongue
- Slobulus: A drooling green creature with one eye hanging out of its socket
- Aargh: A blue-skinned Frankenstein monster-esque creature with stitching all over its face and a missing eye
- Horn Head: A horned cyclops with a nose ring (which is chained to its ear in the Art Asylum era)
- Dust Brain: A mummy with rotting teeth and wrinkly teal skin
- Oculus Orbus: A bloodshot eyeball (later sporting a mouth in the Just Play era)
- Skull Face: A skull with large eye sockets sporting tiny red eyes, a big set of teeth, and a partially exposed brain (which is depicted as a sentient being named Lobe in the Just Play era)
- Bash Brain: A gory zombie head with a partially exposed brain. This Madball was originally named "Crack Head," but was later renamed "Bash Brain," due to the unpleasant connotations of crackhead as a slang term for a crack cocaine addict.

All Madballs toys were conceived in the early 1980s by the creative team at American Greetings Properties, which was formally named Those Characters From Cleveland, or TCFC for short: Ralph Shafer, George Chanter, Mark Spangler, Jim Elliott, Kim Hammeren, and Vint Gonser. Editorial by Clark Wiley and Tom Jacobs

=== Second series Madballs ===
- Snake Bait: A forked tongue-sporting gorgon (later depicted in the Just Play era as a monster being devoured by a snake)
- Freaky Fullback: A mutant football player
- Splitting Headache: A monster with the skin on half of its face peeled off
- Bruise Brother: An ugly biker with a battered blue helmet
- Wolf Breath: A werewolf with large, rotten fangs dripping with blood (drool in the Art Asylum era)
- Fist Face: A severed hand clutching an eyeball (later depicted as a severed hand with an eyeball emerging from the wrist in the Just Play era)
- Swine Sucker: An ugly, drooling wild boar
- Lock Lips: A creature with its jaw locked shut and one eye covered by a riveted plate

=== Super Madballs ===
- Touchdown Terror: An American football with a manic grin and missile-like fins and tip
- Goal Eater: A soccer ball with very large pointed teeth
- Foul Shot: A basketball bursting open to reveal a face with worms crawling out of one eye socket

=== Head-Popping Madballs ===
These were posable figures with an ejectable/swappable head:

- Dust Brain, Skull Face, Screamin' Meemie, Oculus Orbus, Horn Head, and Slobulus from Series 1
- Bruise Brother, Wolf Breath, and Lock Lips from Series 2

=== Similar imitation toys ===
Due to the popularity of the Madballs, there were many similar imitation toys, such as:

- "Blurp Balls" by ERTL: Boney Tossteeth, Tyranosaurus Retch, Count Heave-A-Heart, Spittooey Sooey, Biff Barfball, Sharky Skullsquirt, Retch-A-Rat Tomcat, and Croaky Bugchuck. These toys were designed by artist James Groman, with character names and editorial by Rick Reising.
- "Weird Balls" by The Mel Appel Company: Sewer Face, Brain Ball, Wart Hog, Spit Ball, Shrink Head, and Rock Slime
- "Spit Balls" by Lanard Toys: Sharky, 20/20, Ba-Boom, and Crybaby

=== Original Madballs re-release ===
In 2016, the vinyl figure company Kidrobot released nine of the original Madballs in their original foam style, slightly modified. They also released keychains and vinyl figure blind boxes. These are the Madballs that were released:

- Screamin' Meemie
- Oculus Orbus
- Slobulus
- Skull Face
- Horn Head
- Dust Brain
- Freaky Fullback
- Swine Sucker
- Lock Lips

== Home video ==
Madballs: Escape from Orb VHS front cover

Unlike many high-profile toylines at the time, the Madballs did not have an accompanying television series. They did, however, have two direct-to-home video cartoons released by Nelvana.

The first one, released in 1986, was a 22-minute episode called Madballs: Escape from Orb in which the titular characters are a rock and roll band who performs across the galaxy but heads for Earth as music is illegal on their home planet, Orb. The video also featured a female, cartoon-exclusive Madball named Freakella, modeled after the Bride of Frankenstein. It was directed by Laura Shepherd and written by Heather MacGillvray and John de Klein.

The second one, released in 1987, was another 22-minute episode called Madballs: Gross Jokes that was a series of jokes and skits performed by the Madballs. Both of these releases are only available on VHS and are not yet available on either DVD or Blu-ray.

=== Cast ===
- Screamin' Meemie: A baseball with an eerie grin. He is apparently the Madballs' leader, as he often refers to his friends as the "gang". He also seems to be a friend of Freakella, because they are seen together near the end of the introduction and he is often seen speaking with her. He was voiced by Geoffrey Bowes.
- Horn Head: A cyclops face with a horn. He is the strongest member of the group. He was voiced by Keith Hampshire.
- Aargh: A blue-skinned Frankenstein monster-esque Madball with one eye completely open and the other one completely shut. He is friends with Slobulus, even though he often abuses him and the two of them argue a lot, especially over which one of them is the Madballs' biggest fan. He was voiced by John Stocker.
- Skull Face: A skull with a smile who is best friends with Horn Head and Dusty Dustbrain. He speaks with a slight stutter. He was also voiced by John Stocker.
- Dusty Dustbrain: A very intelligent mummy, who is female in this version. She was voiced by Jeri Craden.
- Freakella: A Bride of Frankenstein-esque Madball who hates being called "Mophead". She was voiced by Cree Summer in the first video and Taborah Johnson in the second video.
- Slobulus: A drooling face with one eye hanging from the socket. He is friends with Aargh, even though Aargh often abuses him and the two of them often argue a lot, especially over which one of them is the Madballs' biggest fan. He was voiced by Dan Hennessey.
- Bruise Brother: One of the evil Badballs who looks like a biker with a German helmet, eye patch and beard. He is Wolf Breath's right-hand man, also voiced by Dan Hennessey.
- Freaky Fullback: A purple monster wearing an orange football helmet, also voiced by Dan Hennessey
- Oculus Orbus: A giant eyeball, voiced by Len Carlson
- Bash Brain: A normal face with its scalp ripped off to expose its brain, also voiced by Len Carlson. He made a cameo in Madballs: Escape from Orb and his first full appearance was in Madballs: Gross Jokes.
- Wolf Breath: The leader of the evil Badballs. He is a werewolf who has a habit of using breath spray frequently, voiced by Don Francks.
- Skip: The Madballs' manager on Earth, voiced by Christopher Ward.
- Sandy: Skip's sister, voiced by Alyson Court

== Comic books ==
Marvel Comics's former children's comics imprint Star Comics released a three-issue miniseries (September–November 1986), which continued with issue #4 (June 1987) as a bi-monthly comic book series. The series was cancelled with issue #10 (June 1988). The main villains of the comic book were Dr. Frankenbeans (a nominal spoof of Victor Frankenstein), and his bumbling assistant Schnivelitch, his Igor-type assistant.

Marvel UK released a one-shot issue called Madballs Annual (1988). Produced by Marvel UK in hardcover format, it reprints the comic book story of the creation of the Madballs by Dr. Frankenbeans and also features games and activities.

== Madballs re-releases ==
In early 2006, toy company Art Asylum announced that it had partnered with original rights holder American Greetings to revive the Madballs toys, with both classic characters and new designs. Toy company Basic Fun Inc. took up the task of producing/selling the new Madballs designed by artist James Groman, who worked on the original line. As of November 2007, the toys began appearing in toy stores in the U.S.

=== Classic Series 1 ===
Madballs Classic Series 1 consists of five re-designed Madballs characters from the original Series 1 (Screamin' Meemie, Skull Face, Bash Brain, Slobulus and Horn Head) and also the first new Madballs character since the toy line's original demise in the mid- to late 1980s: Repvile, an angry, blue, scabrous reptilian. Newly designed sculpts for two other Madballs, Dust Brain and Freaky Fullback, as well as Super Madball Touchdown Terror, were also shown at Toy Fair and Comic-Con 2006, but the former two would be held off until Classic Series 2, and the latter was never released. American Greetings also hinted at the creation of a Super Madball named Goalrilla which would mimic the design of a soccer ball (this was possibly a redesign of the original Goal Eater Super Madball). Aargh from the original Series 1 is the only standard-sized character that was not redesigned or mooted for redesign, although Repvile seems to be a homage to the original Aargh Madball.

=== Classic Series 2 ===
Six more Madballs forming Classic Series 2 were released in the U.S. in 2008 (Freaky Fullback, Wolf Breath and Swine Sucker from the original Series 2, plus Dust Brain and Oculus Orbus from the original Series 1 and new Madball Blech Beard, a puntastically named ghastly pirate). The rebooted Madballs line was noted for its vastly more detailed sculpts; this was especially noticeable in the redesigned original characters.

=== Sick Series 1 and Sick Series 2 ===
In addition to the standard Madballs Classic Series, there was an entirely new Madballs variant in stores called Madballs Sick Series. Each of the (so far released) two series in this line featured three re-designed Madballs characters from the Classic Series (Bash Brain, Slobulus and Skull Face composed Sick Series 1 and Freaky Fullback, Dust Brain and Blech Beard composed Sick Series 2) which could be squeezed to reveal their insides (for example, Bash Brain had brains that bubbled, Slobulus contained eyeballs that popped out and Skull Face concealed spiders that squirmed out).

=== Classic Series 3 and Classic Series 4 ===
Two more Madballs series, Classic Series 3 and Classic Series 4, were planned but never made (however, see International modern revival below).

=== Madballs by Premium DNA Toys ===
Premium DNA Toys have produced Madballs six-inch-scale action figurines. The figures were announced in June 2020. The figurines will feature weapons and "MADular" interchangeable parts. They are modeled after the classic "Head Popping" Madballs figures from the late 1980s; however, these do not feature the head popping gimmick, opting for articulation and a more "action figure"-like approach.

Wave 1 of the Premium DNA toy line includes Hornhead, Splitting Headache, Bruise Brother and Oculus Orbus. Wave 2 will feature Slobulus, Swine Sucker, WolfBreath and Clang Fang.

== International modern revival ==
In 2009 European territories, including Italy and the UK, began receiving a series of 10 officially licensed miniature water-squirting Giraprendi Madballs. The Italian Madballs are slightly larger (golf ball-sized) and more rubbery than their UK counterparts. In the UK, they are dispensed sealed in small semi-transparent plastic spheres from vending machines which also distributed Nintendo- and Disney-branded toys. Some of the toys are based on the planned (but never made) Classic Series 3 and Classic Series 4 Madballs, some simply with name changes; others are entirely new creations. They are as follows:

- Scum Chum: A mutant anglerfish
- Brain Rot: A zombie scientist
- Creep Frog: A horrid frog with a mouthful of mini-beasts
- Flea Bag: A hideous dog/cat hybrid
- Spews Ooze: A psychotic dragon impaled with weapons and armor
- Deck Head: A skater speared with a skateboard
- Eye Sore: An abomination with mouths for eyes and eyes for a mouth
- Spit Bull: A branded rabid bull
- Racket Attack: A mauled tennis player
- Fang Thang: A saber-toothed cat eating a caveman

== Video games ==
A video game based on the toy franchise, simply titled Madballs, was published in 1988 by Ocean Software for a variety of then-popular 8-bit home computers. It was a top-down view action game and received poor to average reviews from the gaming media.

As part of the E3 videogame show, it was announced on May 31, 2009 that Canadian game developer PlayBrains was releasing a video game sequel to BaboViolent 2, including Madballs characters called Madballs in Babo: Invasion. It was released for Xbox Live Arcade on July 15, 2009. The gameplay involves rolling around expansive terrain maps carrying large weaponry (machine guns, etc.) and causing mass destruction. It also includes four player co-op, team v. team and free-for-all modes over Xbox Live, in addition to a unique multiplayer mode where two teams of players build their side of the map, then attack a base on the other team's side. There is also a multiplayer mode where people can play as the head of their Xbox Live avatars. Of the characters in the game, only two are Madballs: Oculus Orbus and Horn Head. An iPhone, iPod Touch and iPad game based on the Madballs characters titled Babo Crash HD was also released.

== 2017 animated shorts ==
In addition to the new product line, AGE and Just Play joined together with Oddbot Studios to produce new animated Madballs shorts. Released on the Madballs YouTube channel on March 1, 2017, the cartoon features the six core characters – Skullface, Horn Head, Screamin' Meemie, Oculus Orbus, Dust Brain and Slobulus.
