= Popples =

Toy and cartoon franchise

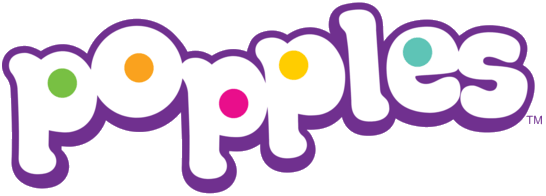
- Type: Stuffed toys
- Invented by: American Greetings
- Company: Those Characters From Cleveland, American Greetings; Hasbro (current)
- Country: United States
- Availability: 1986–2020

Popples is a toy and television franchise created by Those Characters From Cleveland (TCFC), the toy and licensing design division of American Greetings. Popples resemble brightly colored marsupial teddy bears with long tails ending in a pom-pom. Each Popple character transforms to resemble a brightly colored ball. In 2018, Popples was sold to Hasbro.

== History ==
Susan Trentel, who worked for TCFC and had created the first prototypes of the Strawberry Shortcake dolls and Care Bears toys, was the plush toy designer who invented the method for transforming the Popple. Supposedly, the idea came from rolling up socks. Trentel worked with art director Thomas Schneider on the creation of the first prototypes (Patent #4614505).

== Toy merchandise ==
Popples were manufactured by Mattel between 1986 and 1988. Each toy had a pouch on the back that could be inverted so the character rolled into the pouch and resembled a brightly colored ball.

=== Original line (1986) ===
The first introduction included nine Popples in three different sizes:

- Pretty Cool (P.C. for short) is a 13 inches (330 mm) male Popple with blue fur, pink hair, orange cheeks and contrasting orange and yellow ears.
- Party is a 13 inches (330 mm) female Popple, with pink fur, hot pink hair, lavender cheeks and contrasting lavender and pink ears.
- Pancake is a 13 inches (330 mm) female Popple with purple fur, orange hair, pink cheeks and contrasting blue and pink ears.
- Puzzle is an 11 inches (280 mm) male Popple with orange fur, green hair, pink cheeks and contrasting blue and red ears.
- Prize is an 11 inches (280 mm) female Popple with dark magenta fur, white hair, lavender cheeks and contrasting green and pink ears.
- Puffball is an 11 inches (280 mm) female Popple with white fur, yellow hair, orange cheeks and contrasting blue and magenta ears.
- Pretty Bit is a 8 inches (200 mm) female Popple with lavender fur, hot pink hair, pink cheeks and contrasting pink and blue ears.
- Potato Chip is a 8 inches (200 mm) female Popple with yellow fur, pink hair, pink cheeks and contrasting lavender and magenta ears.
- Putter is a 8 inches (200 mm) male Popple with green fur, orange hair, pink cheeks and contrasting red and blue ears.

==== Rock Star Popples and Baby Popples ====
The second launch brought the Rock Star Popples: Punkity (magenta girl with microphone and star on her belly) and Punkster (blue boy with electric guitar and lightning bolt on his belly) as well as the Popples Babies: Bibsy (white with purple and white bonnet, bib and booties with star pattern) and Cribsy (pink with blue and white striped bonnet, bib and booties). The babies had rattles in their tails and came with a squeaking baby bottle.

==== Pufflings ====
A line extension brought about Pufflings, which looked like little Popple pets (they were basically a ball of fluff with a face, tiny paws and tail) that could flip inside out to look a bit like a beanie hat and carried riddles and jokes on tags inside them. The Pufflings came in six different colours: Red, yellow, sky blue, purple, white and magenta.

==== Sports Popples ====
These Popples turned into sports balls: Big Kick (soccer ball), Dunker (basketball), Touchdown (football), P.C. Pitcher (baseball) and Net Set (tennis ball). The Sports Popples included Cuester, who turned into an 8-ball, but no toy was made of him. Similarly, no toy was made of the original Pitcher, but a toy was made of P.C. dressed in a baseball outfit to replace him.

==== Other full-sized Popples ====
There were numerous other Popples toys made during the series' original run, including Flower Popples (which could turn into flowers when flipped inside out), Pillow Popples (wearing pajamas and turned into sleeping bags), Fruit Popples (which turned into different fruits), and Costume Popples that wore special outfits and turned into something related (such as a ballerina Popple that turned into a handbag). There were also Special Edition Popples toys with limited distribution (including a Puppy Popple with black and white spots, resembling a Dalmatian, and an animal series only released in Europe with Popples that resembled a parrot, dog and rabbit).

==== Pocket Popples ====
Another successful related line of merchandise were Pocket Popples. Based on the same characters as the larger plush Popples, they were scaled to fit in a pocket or bag. They had PVC faces, articulated arms and legs, and fabric ears, tails and pocket (where they hid).

=== 2001 relaunch ===
In 2001, Toymax relaunched the Popples toyline. This rendition features three characters named Pixie Doodle, Polka Dottie and Pinwheel Penny. Toymax also produced Glow 'N Charm Popples (Pitter Patty, Pizazzy Jazzy and Popsy Daisy) and a Snoozytime Popple wearing pyjamas and a nightcap, as well as celebrity Popples designed and customized by celebrities such as Tiffany, Rachael Leigh Cook, Elisa Donovan, Nicole Oliver, Melissa Joan Hart, Ananda Lewis, Shoshanna Lonstein, Jessica Biel and Christina Ricci.

=== 2007 relaunch ===
A second relaunch was attempted by Playmates Toys (who also produced toys featuring another American Greetings property, Strawberry Shortcake) in 2007. This rendition features four characters, KissyPopp (pink), HappyPopp (yellow), PrettyPopp (purple) and MonsterPopp (blue), marketed under the name 'Popp 'N Giggles Popples' which contain a sound box that makes a popping sound followed by a giggle when the Popple comes out of its pouch (or when the shoulders of the Popple are pressed down while in its box, or sitting on a hard surface). Also released in 2007 was an updated version of Popples 'Pufflings' called 'Popp 'N Mini Message Popples', SpeedyPopp (red), FriendlyPopp (purple), RiddlePopp (blue) and SecretPopp (pink) which could record a 'message' and play it back.

There are also mini plush Popples in the style of the original 1980s Popples available in Japan and other Asian countries, resembling Party, Puffball and Potato Chip. Merchandise such as bags, clothing, keychains, iron-on patches and stationery featuring the classic Popples exist as well.

=== 2015 relaunch ===
Coinciding with the new Popples series on Netflix, another revived attempt at the toy line was released in 2015 by Spin Master and Saban Brands, introducing new characters Bubbles, Lulu, Sunny, Izzy, and Yikes.

=== 2025 relaunch ===
In 2024, The Loyal Subjects inked a deal with Hasbro to relaunch a host of legacy brands, including Popples. A plush collection was released the following year in August.

== Television media ==
Popples was a Saturday morning cartoon, based on the Popples toys, that aired in the United States from 1986 to 1987. The pilot was a live-action special, produced by Shelley Duvall, in which there were puppets and marionettes. After this was well-received, it was decided to make a cartoon series with the same characters.

=== Original series ===
The original Popples animated series was broadcast in United States, and later rebroadcast in the United Kingdom.

=== Second series ===
The franchise was adapted for Netflix that premiered in 2015.

== Other media ==
Star Comics released a four-issue series between 1986 and 1987, coinciding with the original cartoon.

== See also ==
- Care Bears
- Paw Paws
- My Little Pony
- The Wuzzles
- Trolls
