= Care Bears: Unlock the Magic =

Children's animated television series

- Genre: Adventure; Comedy; Fantasy
- Based on: Care Bears by Elena Kucharik and Linda Denham
- Voices of: Debi Derryberry (Note: Under the alias Alex Hall); Jason LaShea; Nick Shakoour; Brenna Larsen; Justin Michael; Patrick Pedraza
- Theme music composer: David Padrutt
- Opening theme: "Caring Is the Key" performed by Chayla Hope
- Ending theme: "Caring Is the Key"(instrumental)
- Composers: David Padrutt; Michael Seifert
- Countries of origin: United States; Canada
- Original language: English
- No. of seasons: 1
- No. of episodes: 49 + 6 specials

Production
- Executive producers: Davis Doi; Sean Gorman; Karen Vermeulen; Ryan Wiesbrock
- Editor: Caley MacLennan
- Running time: 11 minutes (regular); 22 minutes (specials)
- Production companies: Cloudco Entertainment; Copernicus Studios

Original release
- Network: Boomerang (Note: Various episodes have aired/released early on Tiny Pop in the UK, TiJi in France, Family Jr. and Télémagino in Canada, Hop! Channel in Israel, e.tv in South Africa, Yey! in the Philippines, StarzPlay in the Middle East, and the Noggin app in Latin America.)
- Release: February 1, 2019 – November 2, 2024
- Network: Cartoon Network
- Release: April 16, 2019 – October 21, 2024

Related
- Care Bears & Cousins

Care Bears: Unlock the Magic is an animated children's television series and the sixth television series based on the Care Bears franchise, following Care Bears & Cousins.

The series follows the adventures of Good Luck, Funshine, Cheer, Grumpy, and Share Bear as they go on a mission to protect the land of the Silver Lining. The series premiered on Boomerang's streaming service on February 1, 2019, the television channel on March 30, 2019, and on Cartoon Network on April 16, 2019. On May 20, 2022, it was announced six new specials were ordered and would air on Cartoonito and HBO Max, where it had been airing since 2021.

== Plot ==
Care Bears: Unlock the Magic follows the adventures of good friends Good Luck, Funshine, Cheer, Grumpy, and Share Bear, as they embark from their life in Care-A-Lot on a new adventure through the Silver Lining, a strange world neighbored by the Whiffles, who are a group of innocently happy creatures that plant seeds to keep the magical land of Care-A-Lot and the neighboring Silver Lining growing. The Care Bears spread caring and sharing throughout the land as they learn to rely on their friendship, courage, and use a bit of their belly badge power.

However, the ego-driven nemesis of the Care Bears, Bluster and his Bad Crowd, try to stop them from succeeding at their mission, as his goal is to turn the Silver Lining into Blusterland. The Care Bears also retrieve help through the Caring Tower from their friends Bedtime, Tenderheart, and Wish Bear. Dibble the Whiffle accompanies the Care Bears along the way.

The Care Bears are sent on the road for the first time in this series, as they explore wonderful and never-before-seen areas that surround Care-A-Lot called the Silver Lining. Due to this, they meet new creatures and employ their powers and wits.

== Characters ==
=== Main ===
- Cheer Bear (voiced by Debi Derryberry, under the pseudonym Alex Hall) – The leader of the group and the pilot of the Cloudseeker. She is a positive go-getter and is always up for a challenge.
- Grumpy Bear (voiced by Nick Shakoour in the TV series, and Justin Michael in the specials) – The team mechanic and resident worrywart. He is flippant and smart-alecky, but deep inside is a kind-hearted Care Bear who is tone-deaf to his own words.
- Funshine Bear (voiced by Justin Michael) – The co-pilot of the Cloudseeker. He is blindly optimistic.
- Share Bear (voiced by Brenna Larsen) – The team communicator. She talks to animals, loves to bake, and also loves connecting with everyone.
- Good Luck Bear (voiced by Patrick Pedraza) – The mission's navigator. He tackles every task with determination and is determined to succeed by himself with no luck involved.
- Dibble (voiced by Brenna Larsen) – The team's pet and companion. She communicates through limited words, coos, and sounds. While it is difficult to understand what she is saying, it is apparent what she is feeling. She is as eager as a puppy and curious as a kitten.

=== The Bad Crowd ===
The Bad Crowd consists of many members, although only four are named. They are led by Bluster to plant the Bad Seeds, and are junior league yes-men toadying up to Bluster and his plans to expand Blusterland.

- Bluster (voiced by Jason LaShea) – The ego-driven, annoying, narcissistic leader of the Bad Crowd and the main antagonist of the series. He is an adolescent prankster and irredeemably mischievous. His plan is to change the Silver Lining into a land of his own, Blusterland.
- Robbie (Voiced by Debi Derryberry, under the pseudonym Alex Hall) – Bluster's assistant.
- Malcom (voiced by Justin Michael) – a member of the Bad Crowd who dreams of taking over Bluster as the leader.
- Bob – a big one-eyed Bad Crowd member. He appeared in "The Beginning", "Nobody's Perfect", "Mixed Signals", "The Grumpy Effect", and "Neon Beach Party".
- Quinchy - a blind Bad Crowd member who appeared in "The Beginning", "Mixed Signals", "The Grumpy Effect", "Things That Go Plunk", and "Neon Beach Party". His only appearance in the video game is "Care Bears: To The Rescue".

=== Recurring ===
- Tenderheart Bear (voiced by Nick Shakoour in the TV series and Jason LaShea in the specials) – The anchor who supports the crew from afar through the Caring Tower. He is kind, wise, and fatherly.
- Wish Bear (voiced by Valarie Rae Miller) – The mission's "mom". She is practical, supportive, and full of wisdom.
- Bedtime Bear (voiced by Harry Chaskin) – The night watch. He is a night owl who loves to read, and is the enthusiastic scholar and the team's "search engine".
- The Whiffles (Voiced by Brenna Larsen and Patrick Pedraza) – Magical creatures who serve the Silver Lining by planting Seeds of Caring. Dibble is one of these creatures.

=== Semi-recurring ===
- Love-a-Lot Bear (voiced by Debi Derryberry, under the pseudonym Alex Hall) – a member of the Care Bears.
- Harmony Bear – Another member of the Care Bears.
- Gus and Garth (voiced by Justin Michael and Harry Chaskin respectively) – Two gnomes who used to be greedy and hogged things, but learned to be nice and share things together, much to their uncle's dismay.
- Plunk (voiced by Harry Chaskin) – A former member of the Bad Crowd who was kicked out of the group by Bluster for being too nice, and now wants to do as much good as possible.
- Togetherness Bear (voiced by Valarie Rae Miller) – A new member of the Care Bears. She first appeared in the Unlock the Music video "Togetherness" and debuted in the special The Quest for the Rainbow Stone.
- No Heart (voiced by Justin Michael) – An old foe of the Care Bears from the past and the overarching antagonist of the series. He will appear in the special The No Heart Games as the main antagonist.
- Do-Your-Best Bear – Another member of the Care Bears who makes a cameo in the special The Quest for the Rainbow Stone.

=== Unlock the Music ===
- Wonderheart Bear – A magenta Care Bear cub, who first appeared in the music video "Best Wishes", since her first appearance in Care Bears: Welcome to Care-a-Lot.
- Secret Bear – A Care Bear who first appeared in the music video "Best Friends". She also makes a cameo in the special The Quest for the Rainbow Stone.
- Best Friend Bear – A Care Bear who also first appeared in the music video "Best Friends". She also makes a cameo in the special The Quest for the Rainbow Stone.
- Birthday Bear – A Care Bear who first appeared in the music video "Surprise Birthday Party". He also makes a cameo in the special The Quest for the Rainbow Stone.
- Hopeful Heart Bear
- I Care Bear
- Dare to Care Bear

== Production ==
Care Bears: Unlock the Magic is co-produced for Boomerang by Cloudco Entertainment and Copernicus Studios. The president of the former, Sean Gorman, has said that "[they] swung for the fences to give the Care Bears the best and most compelling storytelling, animation and broadcaster home."

This series had additional animation services by Toon City.

== Episodes ==
No.	Title	Directed by	Written by	Original release date	Prod. code
1	"The Beginning"	Murray Bain	Karl Geurs	January 28, 2019	101
Funshine is riding his scooter in Care-A-Lot. He notices a door. He uses his belly badge power and it opens the door, dragging him and his scooter into it. It cuts to Grumpy riding a vehicle as the Bears ask if he should drive it. They notice that he ends up not paying attention and almost crashes into a hill - only with Good Luck's help does he manage to avoid it. After Grumpy lands, they begin to discuss how Grumpy almost crashed the "Cloudseeker". They get a call from Caring Tower about Funshine's situation as he explains it to the Bears. The Care-o-Meter drops. Grumpy, along with Share, Good Luck, and Cheer prepare to leave. They come across the "gate to the Silver Lining". They realize he used his belly badge power. They wake up Bedtime in order to get his help. The group finds Funshine. They prepare to leave. However, they fail to do so. They walk outside to see what is making a noise. They think it's just a loose piece. A creature pops out and laughs at Grumpy. The creature is called a “Whiffle”. They begin to get the creature (named Dibble) home. The other Whiffles prepare to look for Dibble. However, they argue and create bad vibes. We meet Bluster and the Bad Crowd as they explain their motives and what they prepare to do. The Bears have finally arrived at Dibble's home, where they find the other Whiffles. All the Whiffles begin to surround Grumpy. The Bears then get to witness a Seed of Caring being planted. Bluster leaves to make the Whiffles unhappy again. The Bears begin to leave and say their goodbyes to the Whiffles. Right as the Bears leave, Bluster arrives. The Bears head back because the Whiffles are in trouble. They meet Bluster and get into a chase, and the Bears end up victorious. Grumpy makes Cheer the pilot. The Bears prepare to leave again, but decide to stay because Bluster will keep coming back. Note: This episode was produced as 1 22-minute episode. However, it can also air as two separate 11-minute episodes.
2	"A Patch of Perturbed Petunias"	Murray Bain	Karl Geurs	February 1, 2019	102
The Bears find themselves involved with a situation between some Flowers and some Whiffles, and Share wonders if she has "lost her touch".
3	"Nobody's Perfect"	Murray Bain	Carter Crocker	February 1, 2019	103
After losing concentration in a video game, Cheer wonders if she can do anything right while riding the cloudseeker anymore.
4	"A Yoorg Awakening"	Murray Bain	Dev Ross	February 1, 2019	104
Funshine's joking around and fun accidentally hurts a creature, called a Yoorg's feelings when he makes fun of it, and so it comes to life.
5	"Rain, Rain, Go Away"	Murray Bain	Karl Geurs	February 1, 2019	105
While doing important work, Grumpy's Belly Badge goes out of control, so he tries to be happy so it doesn't happen again.
6	"Waffle Cones for Whiffles"	Murray Bain	Carter Crocker	February 1, 2019	106
The Whiffles are hot and bothered because they cannot have their favorite treat - as the Icelings have gone missing.
7	"The Big Whifflesnooze"	Murray Bain	Dev Ross	February 1, 2019	107
Cheer doesn't tend onto a problem the Whiffles are having, and end up with them asleep - for over 100 years!
8	"Mixed Signals"	Murray Bain	Karl Geurs	February 1, 2019	108
Tenderheart informs the Care Bears that their Silver Lining mission is over and that they can return to Care-a-Lot, but Cheer is certain that something fishy is going on.
9	"Funshine's Un-Fun Day"	Murray Bain	Carter Crocker	February 1, 2019	109
Funshine accidentally breaks a necklace that Cheer loves, so he hides it away after his attempts at repairing it fails.
10	"Festival of Hearts"	Murray Bain	Denise Downer	February 1, 2019	116
Two gnomes steal the gift-making crystal heart, and the Bears, tagging along with the visiting Love-a-Lot Bear, must get it back in time for the Festival of Hearts. Note: This is a Valentine's Day-themed episode.
11	"The Great Giggle"	Murray Bain	Carter Crocker	February 28, 2019	110
It's the day of the blooming of the Piñata Tree, and the Bears must make sure that the keeper is having a good laugh, but Good Luck's failed attempts at making the keeper laugh almost cause the tree to not bloom.
12	"An Almost Eggless Easter" "A Care Bears Easter"	Murray Bain	Carter Crocker	March 28, 2019	117
The Easter Bunny's eggs are drained of their color. Cheer, Funshine, and Grumpy put on their Easter costumes. The Bears must make sure their color returns or Dibble will miss her very first easter egg hunt. Note: This is an Easter-themed episode.
13	"If It's Broke, Fix It"	Murray Bain	Carter Crocker	May 2, 2019 (Note: These episodes first premiered worldwide on Tiny Pop in the UK on April 10, 2019.)	111
Grumpy is tired of Dibble's happy-go-lucky nature while he is working on an important invention, so he tells Dibble that she cannot work with him anymore.
14	"The Grumpy Effect"	Murray Bain	Don Gillies	May 2, 2019	112
Grumpy gets trapped in a large maze created by Bluster in order to create a Bad Seed.
15	"Things That Go Plunk"	Murray Bain	Denise Downer	May 2, 2019	113
A shy member of the Bad Crowd claims he is kicked out of the Bad Crowd for being too nice. Grumpy thinks he might be up to something.
16	"On the Trail of the Cloud Bouncer"	Murray Bain	Don Gillies	May 2, 2019 (Note: These episodes first premiered worldwide on Tiny Pop in the UK on April 11, 2019.)	114
Spores take control of the Cloudseeker and attempt to find their home, but the Bears think they will destroy the garden, so they build a barrier to protect it.
17	"Riffle the Whiffle"	Murray Bain	Carter Crocker	May 2, 2019	115
The Bears find a Whiffle who can only say the word "Riffle".
18	"A Wish-full Reunion"	Murray Bain	Dev Ross	May 2, 2019 (Note: These episodes first premiered worldwide on Tiny Pop in the UK on April 12, 2019.)	118
Mysterious hearts lead Wish Bear into the Silver Lining.
19	"The Big Rumble"	Murray Bain	Don Gillies	May 2, 2019	120
A family of rocks move into the Silver Lining and inadvertently cause no one to get any sleep.
20	"Three Cheers for Cheer!"	Murray Bain	Denise Downer	May 2, 2019	121
When Cheer starts to overwork herself, the other Bears decide to help her out in an attempt to get her to relax. However, in the process, Share accidentally duplicates Cheer, which works herself (and the others) too hard.
21	"The Badge of Courage"	Jay Silver	Phil Harnage	May 2, 2019	122
Dibble pretends to be a superhero.
22	"One Wise Bear"	Jay Silver	Carter Crocker	May 30, 2019	123
The Bears get stuck in the Valley of Whispering Winds and are led to believe they are useless. Tenderheart, feeling protective, goes off to protect and give them the advice they need to get through the valley.
23	"Neon Beach Party"	Murray Bain	Karl Geurs	June 27, 2019	130
The Bad Crowd and the Care Bears are trying to enjoy their vacations, but end up having trouble doing so after Malcom puts a force field over their sides of the Beach. Note: This episode was released as a 22-minute special, but can be aired as two separate 11-minute episodes.
24	"The Birthday That Wasn't"	Murray Bain	Dev Ross	August 1, 2019	119
The Care Bears decide to gift Dibble a plush Wiffle for her "Un-Birthday", but she wonders if the plush is actually replacing her.
25	"Share Your Care"	Jay Silver	Dev Ross	September 5, 2019	126
Dibble accidentally plants an invasive species, so the Whiffles and the Bears have to round up all the seeds and remove all the trees.
26	"Monsterplant"	Jay Silver	Phil Harnage	October 26, 2019 (Note: This episode first premiered worldwide on Tiny Pop in the UK on July 14, 2019.)	127
A creation of Bluster's turns out to be a Friendly Monster who wants to make friends with the Whiffles, but Monsterplant wonders why they are scared of him.
27	"Snow-verload"	Jay Silver	Karl Geurs	December 2, 2019	149/150
A Tropical Valley beyond the Silver Lining is turned into a Winter Wonderland, and the Bears are on the case on what has caused this. Afterwards, Bluster, Robbie and Malcom invade Care-a-Lot and attempt to steal the Care-O-Meter to try and foil the Care Bears' mission. Note: This is a Christmas-themed 22-minute special. This episode was produced as two separate 11-minute episodes, titled "The Big Freeze" and "Return to Care-A-Lot". It was also intended to be the season finale, but was released during Christmas 2019.
28	"The Return of the Gnomes"	Murray Bain	Denise Downer	May 1, 2020 (Note: These episodes first premiered worldwide on Tiny Pop in the UK on November 10, 2019.)	127
The uncle of Gus and Garth returns and attempt to make them greedy again. This leads the Bears to convince them that being kind and generous is the right thing once again.
29	"Power Outage"	Jay Silver	Phil Harnage	May 1, 2020	131
When the Whiffles spread such bad vibes in an argument that not even a regular Care Bear Stare can fix, Grumpy creates a device to amplify the effects of it, however he doesn't feel confident in using the device.
30	"Where Oh Where Has Our Funshine Gone?"	Jay Silver	Dev Ross	May 1, 2020 (Note: This episode first premiered worldwide on Tiny Pop in the UK on November 16, 2019.)	132
Funshine gets so far into a superhero character he's created that he dozes off on a mission and puts Good Luck in danger.
31	"Dibble's Dust-Up"	Jay Silver	Dev Ross	September 3, 2020 (Note: This episode first premiered worldwide in French on TiJi in France on October 11, 2019. The English version premiered on Family Jr. in Canada on October 22, 2019.)	124
Dibble finds some dust bunnies while cleaning the Cloudseeker and doesn't want to get rid of them when they become her friend. Grumpy, however, disapproves.
32	"Hide and Sneak"	Jay Silver	Don Gillies	September 3, 2020 (Note: This episode first premiered worldwide on Tiny Pop in the UK on October 30, 2019.)	125
The Bad Crowd ends up trapping the Bears in the Cloudseeker using a device Robbie created while Dibble plays an important game of Hide and Sneak with the Whiffles, so she has to find and free them.
33	"The Light in the Forest"	Jay Silver	Carter Crocker	September 3, 2020	128
A stowaway creature named a Sparklewing gets lost, so the Care Bears let it stay in the Cloudseeker. Over time, Cheer befriends it.
34	"Water, Water Everywhere"	Jay Silver	Denise Downer	September 3, 2020 (Note: These episodes first premiered worldwide on Tiny Pop in the UK on November 17, 2019.)	133
When Funshine spots the Bad Crowd taking away the Whiffles' water from the sky while invisible, Grumpy doesn't believe him because of all the pranks he pulls.
35	"The Ultimate Bad Seed"	Jay Silver	Don Gillies	September 3, 2020	134
When Malcom manages to trick Bluster (and Robbie, by accident) into putting their bad vibes into a Bad Seed that he will use to give him their bad vibes, the Bears must retrieve it and get the vibes back to Bluster and Robbie.
36	"Rise and Funshine!"	Jay Silver	Dev Ross	September 3, 2020 (Note: These episodes first premiered worldwide in French on TiJi in France on December 13, 2019. The English version premiered on Play RTS in Switzerland on December 20, 2019.)	135
When the group (except for Funshine and Dibble) end up falling asleep, Funshine must learn how to pilot the Cloudseeker in order to wake them up on time.
37	"Road Trip"	Jay Silver	Carter Crocker	September 3, 2020	136
When Cheer doubts Bedtime's directions, the other Bears back him up. However, when he realizes he's accidentally sent them the wrong way, he starts to worry.
38	"The Incredible Shrinking Bears"	Jay Silver	Phil Harnage	September 3, 2020	137
When a fog comes and shrinks the Bears down to a minuscule size, Dibble must aid them in order to get them back to regular size.
39	"Finders Keepers"	Jay Silver	Don Gillies	September 3, 2020	138
When Dibble loses her beloved ball and finds that a creature named the Keeper has taken it, she and the Bears must retrieve it.
40	"Sorry Not Sorry"	Jay Silver	Dev Ross	September 3, 2020 (Note: These episodes first premiered worldwide on Tiny Pop in the UK on November 23, 2019.)	139
Grumpy accidentally trips over a plant and has to apologize for it "Whiffle-style". However, his apology ends up so good the Whiffles crown him leader of the garden.
41	"Plunk to the Rescue"	Jay Silver	Denise Downer	December 1, 2020	140
Plunk tries to help on a mission with the Bears, but ends up inadvertently causing things to go wrong in the process.
42	"Once Upon a Rainbow"	Jay Silver	Carter Crocker	December 1, 2020	141
When the garden (and Grumpy) end up going pale, the Bears must figure out why this is happening, while also trying to retrieve the color.
43	"After the Klatternack!"	Jay Silver	Don Gillies	December 1, 2020	142
A creature named the Klatternack is causing some chaos with the Whiffles, so the Bears (along with a mysterious creature named Tracker) must track him down. However, Share finds something that shocks them all.
44	"Let the Fun Shine"	Jay Silver	Dev Ross	December 1, 2020 (Note: These episodes first premiered worldwide on Tiny Pop in the UK on November 24, 2019.)	143
When the Bears take a day to relax, Funshine attempts to mimic the cloud that Dibble makes when she feels pure joy.
45	"Valley of the Shamrocks"	Jay Silver	Denise Downer	December 1, 2020	144
Grumpy replaces Good Luck with a robot as the navigator, making him feel useless, until he discovers the Valley of the Shamrocks.
46	"Some Luck"	Jay Silver	Carter Crocker	December 1, 2020	145
While helping to deliver spores to an area that really needs it, Good Luck seems to suffer some bad luck, making him think he's been cursed with bad luck.
47	"Out of the Cheer Zone"	Jay Silver	Dev Ross	December 1, 2020	146
Cheer takes time off her duties in order to babysit 2 Whiffles that are with Dibble. However, when she can't seem to do it, she believes she isn't good enough.
48	"The Last Laugh"	Jay Silver	Don Gillies	December 1, 2020 (Note: These episodes first premiered worldwide on Tiny Pop in the UK on November 30, 2019.)	147
When the rest of the Bears don't laugh at his jokes, Funshine wanders off and finds the Laffinpuff, a creature that makes everything he says funny. Funshine, however, soon grows exasperated at how they laugh at everything he says.
49	"Say What?"	Jay Silver	Denise Downer	December 1, 2020	148
When Share (and later Grumpy) loses her voice in a batch of flowers, the rest of the Bears search to find the cause of it.

=== Specials (2024) ===
No.	Title	Directed by	Written by	Original release date	Prod. code
1	"The Quest for the Rainbow Stone"	Ian Freedman	Thomas Krajewski	February 4, 2024 (Note: This special first premiered worldwide on Family Jr. in Canada on June 2, 2023.)	TBA
Cheer is so excited for Togetherness' Care Bear ceremony that she accidentally breaks the Rainbow Stone, the very stone that gives Togetherness her color! The Bears venture off to the only other location where the Rainbow Stone can be found (with Bluster and Robbie tagging along), but Cheer's determination to solve the puzzles herself soon leads to problems.
2	"Grumpy's Ginormous Adventure"	Trevor Schellinck	Thomas Krajewski	March 8, 2024 (Note: This special first premiered worldwide on Family Jr. in Canada on May 5, 2023.)	TBA
When Grumpy gets splashed with some magical water, it increases his size. However, the problem lies that when the already grumpy Grumpy gets even more grumpy, he grows bigger, and when he gets bigger he gets more grumpy!
3	"The Star of a Thousand Wishes"	Ian Freedman	Thomas Krajewski	July 5, 2024 (Note: This special first premiered worldwide on Tiny Pop in the UK on June 10, 2023.)	TBA
After realizing that Wish Bear can't always grant wishes, Funshine and Good Luck find a starbuddy that can grant them a thousand wishes! However, their greed and competitive nature ends up causing them to cause a bigger problem.
4	"The Bad Crowd Strikes Back!"	Ian Freedman	Thomas Krajewski	September 1, 2024 (Note: This special first premiered worldwide on Family Jr. in Canada on July 14, 2023.)	TBA
Caring on Earth is being disrupted by an unidentified flying object, meaning Care-a-Lot is under threat of being erased forever, thanks to Bluster and Robbie. Cheer and Share are in the meanwhile having an argument and must make up before it's too late.
5	"The Mystery of the Snickering Ghost"	Trevor Schellinck	Thomas Krajewski	October 5, 2024 (Note: This special first premiered worldwide on Family Jr. in Canada on June 23, 2023.)	TBA
Bluster is in need of some help when he believes that his lair is haunted. The Bears don't believe in this, until they meet a real ghost.
6	"The No Heart Games"	Trevor Schellinck	Thomas Krajewski	November 2, 2024 (Note: This special first premiered worldwide on Family Jr. in Canada on July 28, 2023.)	TBA
No Heart has returned to put the Caring world into internal darkness. To hold up the time, he holds some games pitting the Bears against the Bad Crowd where the bad vibes power him up! However, can the Bears succeed in stopping his plans before he regains his power?

== Shorts ==
Shorts	Episodes	Originally released	
Shorts	Episodes	First released	Last released
Cloudco Shorts	20	January 12, 2019	May 22, 2019
Unlock the Music	26	June 30, 2020	February 9, 2021

=== Cloudco Shorts (2019) ===
20 shorts were produced for the Care Bears YouTube channel. These are used during the end credits when Unlock the Magic is broadcast on Boomerang.

No.	Title	Original release date
1	"Wake Up, Grumpy Bear" "Alarm"	January 12, 2019
Grumpy attempts to sleep, but his alarm clock keeps startling him. He ends up breaking it, but Dibble begins to make noises, which leaves Grumpy annoyed.
2	"Slam Dunk"	January 18, 2019
Good Luck and Cheer are playing basketball, but Good Luck keeps using his belly badge power. However, as he begins to celebrate his victory, it begins to rain.
3	"Sour"	January 19, 2019
Grumpy's lemon-lime sour smoothie is stolen, so he asks the rest of the gang who took it. He gets no answers until he comes to Funshine, who was the one who took it!
4	"Dancing" "Cleaning"	January 26, 2019
Share cleans the Cloudseeker when she believes nobody is watching, but unwittingly finds an audience in Dibble. This leads her to become shocked when Dibble reveals herself.
5	"BFF Handshake" "Handshake"	January 26, 2019
Good Luck and Funshine practice their handshake but continue to fail. Cheer is not amused as she's ready to move and ends up exasperated.
6	"Rainy Day" "Rain"	February 9, 2019
Funshine keeps on trying to read a comic but Good Luck keeps disturbing him with his beatboxing. When Good Luck does this too many times, Funshine goes outside with an umbrella to get some peace and quiet.
7	"Surprise"	February 23, 2019
Cheer and Share make pancakes for Grumpy for all his hard work, unaware that he has done the same. Both parties end up surprised and throw their pancakes into the air, which splatter all over them!
8	"Ballooned"	March 2, 2019
Dibble's balloon pops, which leaves her very sad. Grumpy continuously attempts to find a balloon, until he manages to find one: his Belly Badge!
9	"Sneeze"	March 14, 2019
Bedtime attempts to order his books, but keeps on sneezing due to the dust. When he tries to clean them, however, he ends up sneezing so hard that all the books fall.
10	"Pancakes"	March 16, 2019
When Grumpy makes pancakes for Dibble when she's cold, she keeps on asking for more. When he runs out of pancakes, he finds out why: Dibble's using them for a blanket!
11	"Bedtime Club"	March 22, 2019
When Share asks Bedtime what he does at night, he just tells her he reads books. This turns out to be a lie, however, when it is discovered that Bedtime rocks out!
12	"Belly Booms"	April 24, 2019
When Share and Cheer combine their belly badge powers and make the Cloudseeker a mess, Grumpy orders them to clean it up. However, when Dibble likes it, he ends up saying it can stay for a little while.
13	"Hide"	April 25, 2019
Bedtime can't seem to find Dibble anywhere when they play a game of hide and seek - that is, until Bedtime turns on all of his cameras and discovers where Dibble is!
14	"Reminders"	April 25, 2019
When Bedtime wakes up, he ends up having to do a lot of chores as his alarm keeps reminding him. At the end, we discover that he's done all this in only 10 minutes as he goes back to sleep.
15	"Grumple Gym"	April 26, 2019
When Dibble continuously rocks back and forth on Grumpy's arms as he does work, he builds her a gym. However, she's content to just keep on playing on his arms.
16	"Work Out"	May 2, 2019
Share and Bedtime begin to work out together. However, Bedtime quickly ends up exhausted and falls asleep, which amuses Share.
17	"Hair"	May 14, 2019
Grumpy shapes his hair in many funny ways while he's in the shower. When he goes to eat pancakes, however, he hasn't fixed his hair, which leads Funshine to make fun of him.
18	"Magic"	May 15, 2019
When Bedtime attempts to do magic tricks (with Grumpy as his audience), it appears to fail. However, unexpected consequences happen when Grumpy's chair begins to float when Bedtime isn't paying attention.
19	"Jigsaw"	May 16, 2019
Good Luck is finishing a jigsaw puzzle but is missing the final piece. He and Funshine continue to look for it until Funshine finds it - it's stuck to his fur!
20	"Good Books"	May 22, 2019
Cheer and Share ask Bedtime as to what his favorite book is. Bedtime says he has a lot of favorites - comic books (for an adventure), a map (when he needs to know about Care-a-Lot), and a time book ("time...for lunch").

=== Care Bears: Unlock the Music ===
Care Bears: Unlock the Music is a series of original music videos uploaded onto the official Care Bears YouTube channel, which uses clips from Unlock the Magic. The series co-owned and globally distributed by Moonbug Entertainment, a YouTube management company for children.

On February 26, 2021, Cloudco released Care Bears Kids Hits: Vol. 1 on digital download, which contains 10 of the songs featured in Unlock the Music. On March 12, 2021, Cloudco released another digital download album featuring the complete first wave of Unlock the Music songs. Many of the songs have also been released as singles as well.

On May 8, 2021, the second wave of songs from Unlock the Music began to be uploaded on the channel. Season 2 will feature 20 brand new songs, with all-new Care Bears featured.

On August 5, 2022, Cloudco released Care Bears Dance Party on digital download, which contains 10 of the songs featured in the second season of Unlock the Music. On September 2, 2022, Cloudco released another digital download album featuring the complete first wave of Unlock the Music songs titled Unlock the Music, Season 2. As with Season 1, many of the songs have also been released as singles as well.

==== Season 1 (2020-21) ====
No.	Title	Original release date
1	"The Magic of Caring"	June 30, 2020
The Care Bears and the Whiffles dance to a song about how caring is good and how you can help around your neighborhood.
2	"I Really Love Tacos"	July 7, 2020
When Bedtime oversleeps and misses Taco Tuesday, he becomes extremely frustrated and begins to crave tacos (while singing a song about it).
3	"Party on a Rainy Day!"	July 14, 2020
Even though it is a rainy day, the bears decide to go outside and dance and sing about all the fun things you can do in the rain.
4	"Dance Like There's No One Watching Us"	July 21, 2020
The Bears take control of their rhythm as they dance to the beat.
5	"I Like to Ride My Bike"	July 28, 2020
Funshine and the other Bears sing a song about riding their bikes, while they ride on them!
6	"Do the Scrub"	August 4, 2020
As Dibble has created a huge mess, the Bears clean the Cloudseeker, inside and out!
7	"Staycation"	August 11, 2020
The Bears sing about how much fun staying at home can be.
8	"Can't Stop the Nap"	August 18, 2020
Funshine, Bedtime and Good Luck rap about going to bed and how you "can't stop" a nap while Grumpy naps.
9	"The Race is On!"	August 25, 2020
The Bears race on their Cloud Cars and in the Cloudseeker.
10	"Swim Buddy"	September 1, 2020
Funshine and Good Luck sing about how you need a buddy while in the pool.
11	"Ice Cream Song"	September 8, 2020
Funshine sings about craving Ice Cream.
12	"No Matter What (We're Family)"	September 15, 2020
Bedtime looks through his photo album and finds out that his friends are indeed a family.
13	"Surprise Birthday"	September 22, 2020
The Bears prepare for a surprise birthday party.
14	"Lucky Day"	September 29, 2020
Good Luck is having such a great and lucky day.
15	"Monster Night"	October 6, 2020
The Bears, the Bad Crowd and Mossy the Monsterplant prepare for Monster Night, and have fun.
16	"See Yourself Be Yourself"	October 20, 2020
The Bears see through their past adventures that they are fine at being how they are.
17	"Care Bear Stare"	October 27, 2020
The Bears sing about their one-in-a-kind ability, the Care Bear Stare!
18	"Like a Rainbow"	November 3, 2020
Cheer and the others show how amazing colors all around us can be.
19	"Share-A-Lot"	November 10, 2020
Share performs a song with the other Bears showing how great it is to share.
20	"Fail It Till You Nail It"	Early-November-2020 (Amazon); November 17, 2020 (YouTube)
Grumpy performs a song about not trying to give up on something very tricky.
21	"Slumber Party"	Early-November-2020 (Amazon); November 24, 2020 (YouTube)
Good Luck, Bedtime, and Funshine perform a song about and during a delightful slumber party and having fun, drinks and snacks along the way.
22	"Good Things Can Come If You Wait"	December 1, 2020
The Bears sing about the fact that waiting is important, and not to rush things.
23	"I love to LOL"	December 1, 2020
Funshine shows us all that laugher is the greatest medicine.
24	"Winter's Finally Here"	November 26, 2020
The Bears have fun playing in the snow.
25	"Make It Up"	February 9, 2021
The Bears try out dressing up.
26	"Move to the Magic"	December 15, 2020
Wish sings how the Care Bears (including her) can unlock the magic in the Silver Lining.

==== Season 2 (2021) ====
No.	Title	Original release date
1	"Best Wishes"	May 8, 2021
Wish Bear and Wonderheart Bear join the other Care Bears to show that dreams really do come true.
2	"Grumpy Dance"	May 15, 2021
Grumpy shows that we all feel a bit Grumpy at some point.
3	"Togetherness"	May 22, 2021
A new Care Bear friend has joined the crew, and she's showing everyone that we're all together.
4	"Silver Lining"	May 29, 2021
Grumpy and Cheer send the other Bears on a hot-air-balloon ride.
5	"Best Friends"	June 5, 2021
The Bears along with Best Friend Bear and Secret Bear dance along to this song about being best friends with each other.
6	"Summertime's Comin'"	June 12, 2021
Funshine and Wonderheart put on the sunscreen and set up a lively song to celebrate the weather... for being sunny!
7	"It's Okay to Make Mistakes"	June 19, 2021
Share shows off that it's all fine to mess up, but we can try again.
8	"The Power of Hugs"	June 26, 2021
The Bears show that hugging somebody can make their day!
9	"Kindness Keepers"	July 3, 2021
The Bears, along with Togetherness Bear, Secret Bear, Best Friend Bear and Wonderheart Bear show that kindness is about being kind to others.
10	"Surprise Birthday Party"	July 10, 2021
The Bears, along with Birthday Bear show that birthdays are a celebration for everyone. Note: This song is a slightly edited version of the Series 1 song "Surprise Birthday".
11	"Camp Care Bears"	July 17, 2021
Wonderheart's pop up book comes to life as the Care Bears' song about camping is very great!
12	"Hopeful Heart"	July 24, 2021
Hopeful Heart shows that its best to not lose hope.
13	"A Little Bit of Nice"	July 31, 2021
Wonderheart spreads kindness and niceness around the area.
14	"Roller Skating's My Jam"	August 7, 2021
Share leads the other Bears into a session of roller skating.
15	"That's Teamwork!"	August 14, 2021
The Bears learn that teamwork means working as a team!
16	"Let's Hula!"	August 21, 2021
Grumpy and Wonderheart go on Care Bear Island to dance and hula with the other Bears!
17	"Friendship Is Out Of This World"	August 28, 2021
The Bears take the Spaceship off to several places that are certainly worth keeping your Friendships with.
18	"You've Got That Sparkle"	September 4, 2021
The Bears show that you can shine so bright if you do it.
19	"Let's Get Ready for Bedtime!"	September 11, 2021
The Bears get ready for Bedtime by dancing and singing.
20	"In My Dreams"	September 18, 2021
As the Bears go to sleep, they showcase that your dreams really do come true.
21	"Always Time To Care A Lot"	November 27, 2021
The Bears learn how to care all the time, with an all-new friend joining the Bears.

==== Bonus videos (2022-23) ====
No.	Title	Original release date
1	"In My Dreams ft. Dream Bright Bear"	March 28, 2022
With Dream Bright Bear, as the Bears go to sleep, they showcase that your dreams really do come true. Note: This song is a slightly edited version of the Series 2 song "In My Dreams".
2	"I Care Bear ft. I Care Bear"	April 19, 2022
I Care Bear showcases how to keep our world safe.
3	"Dare to Care ft. Dare to Care Bear"	April 28, 2023
Dare to Care Bear showcases that caring is a superpower that anyone can have.

== Broadcast ==
=== Original broadcasters ===
Care Bears: Unlock the Magic was co-commissioned by Turner and Tiny Pop, and so the series was first broadcast in the United States and the United Kingdom.

In the United States, the 10 episodes of Care Bears: Unlock the Magic were released to Boomerang's mobile app service on February 1, 2019. A sneak peek release of the first episode was added early to the app on January 28, 2019. The series premiered on the main TV network on March 30, and premiered on Cartoon Network on April 16, 2019. On August 16, 2021, it was announced that the series would air on the Cartoonito block as a weekend programme beginning on September 19, 2021. The series was also added to the HBO Max streaming service before was removed from the service on February 1, 2023, only to be added back in March or April 2023.

=== International ===
In the United Kingdom, the series premiered on Tiny Pop on April 6, 2019. Unlock the Music premiered on Sky Kids on February 13, 2023.

On September 30, 2019, Cloudco Entertainment announced they had sold the series on to many broadcasters including WildBrain's Family Jr. in Canada. On the same day, Cloudco also announced that Bomanbridge Media would be the content agent for the series in Southeast Asia, with the two selling the show to TVB in Hong Kong and ABS-CBN's Yey! in The Philippines. Later foreign deals that would go into 2020 would include StarzPlay in Arabia, among others.

In Latin America, the series was released on Paramount's mobile app service, Noggin on April 1, 2020, and later aired on Nickelodeon and Nick Jr. channels on July 6, 2020.

In Brazil, the series first began airing on Globo's streaming service, Globoplay on September 18, 2020. It was later shown on Gloob and Gloobinho channels on September 20, 2021.

In Portugal, it premiered on Canal Panda in 2021, and continued to air until April 1, 2022.

In Italy, it premiered on DeA Kids, a channel owned by De Agostini, in 2023.

The series was originally slated to premiere on Boomerang in Central and Eastern Europe on September 12, 2022, but it was pulled from the schedule and was written off due to the Warner Bros. Discovery merger, being replaced with a rerun of Mush-Mush and the Mushables. Boomerang renamed to Cartoonito in CEE, where it finally premiered on July 1, 2024, and only aired the six specials. The specials were also aired on Cartoonito channels internationally.

== Merchandise ==
A comic book based on the series was announced by IDW Publishing in March 2019. It was released in July 2019.

In May 2019, Toy company Basic Fun announced they had acquired the master toy rights to the Care Bears franchise, with the toys being based on this series. FiGPiNs were released in March 2020.

=== Home media ===
The show's first DVD release in North America - "Share Your Care" - was released on August 6, 2024, by NCircle Entertainment.

The show's second DVD release in North America - "Seeds of Caring" - was released on March 25, 2025.

The show's third DVD release in North America - "Three Cheers for Cheer" - was released on June 24, 2025.

The show's fourth DVD release in North America - "Good Vibes Only" - was released on September 23, 2025.
