= Peppermint Rose =

Line of children's dolls

Peppermint Rose was a line of dolls made by Mattel and American Greetings in 1992. The dolls were also the subject of an animated half-hour television special, which was produced and released the same year.

== Characters ==
- Peppermint Rose – The leader of the group, dressed in pink and white.
- Miss Vanilla Daisy – A brunette girl dressed in white with assorted colors.
- Lemon Drop Lily – A light brown-haired girl who wears a violet and white dress.
- Merry Mint Violet – An African-American girl who wears a deep purple and green dress.

=== Candy Blossoms ===
Large rabbit-like creatures with huge ears and flowers on their heads, they were sold as plush toys.

- Lollipop Posey
- Bubblegum Violet

=== Sweet Spray ===
Similar to the Candy Blossoms, but sold as plastic figurines.

- Peppermint Posy
- Bubbly
