= Twisted Whiskers =

Greeting card design

Twisted Whiskers is a design for greeting cards developed and licensed by American Greetings and Corus Entertainment created by Terrill Bohlar since 2001. It includes digitally modified photos of animals, creating a caricature. The series includes greeting cards, gift items, wrapping paper, notepads and holiday items. Animated e-cards and instant messenger products have been produced as well. In 2011, American Greetings relaunched the line with the release of greeting cards featuring lenticular designs, showing a pet turning into a trademark character of the Twisted Whiskers line.

== Books ==
The characters of the franchise have appeared in these books:

- Twisted Whiskers Cheer Up! by Jennifer Leczkowski
- Twisted Whiskers: You're Nuts! by Finn Moore
- Twisted Whiskers: Happy Birthday, Gorgeous! by Finn Moore
- Twisted Whiskers: Fabulous Friends! by Jennifer Leczkowski

== American Greetings shorts ==
The 2006 shorts were directed by the director of the television series. The shorts were originally shown on the Twisted Whiskers website. Later, KidMango.com started showing them on their website.

=== Animated shorts characters ===
- Yawp: A black and white puppy with big, blue eyes, he is possibly based upon one of the puppies seen on the greeting cards, and is seen the most in the shorts.
- Dander: A curious calico cat without a personality that gets himself into misadventures, he has been seen to be fond of dancing and drinking from the toilet.
- Goosers: A large mutt who is a friendly, funny dog who often causes mischief for Dander.
- Flouncie: An orange tabby Persian cat who is sophisticated like other cats, though she does not often liked to be bothered. She does not show interest towards Yawp or her owner, and uses a typewriter to create novels.

=== List of the animated shorts ===
- Ruff Road Ahead: Yawp's puppy behavior causes him to be distracted from driving.
- Potty Animal: Dander drinks from the toilet, leading to a flushed misadventure.
- Goosers Gets It!: Goosers encounters a UFO when playing fetch.
- Yawp and Away!: Yawp inhales a balloon, causing him to be popped by Flouncie.
- Novel Kitty: Flouncie is annoyed while trying to type up her novel.
- Kind of a Drag: Dander goes gliding on Goosers' leash.
- Dancin' Paws: Dander dances nonstop to the music.
- Mirror Cracked: Yawp teases his own reflection.
- Getting Jiggy: Dander does a little jig in his litterbox.

== TV series ==
A television series was produced and based on the animated shorts. It aired on The Hub from October 10 to December 1, 2010, in the United States.
