= Holly Hobbie & Friends =

American animated children's specials

- Title card
- Genre: Children's series Animated series Comedy drama Adventure
- Created by: Holly Hobbie
- Developed by: Kate Boutilier; Eryk Casemiro
- Written by: Kate Boutilier; Eryk Casemiro; Mario Piluso (additional material)
- Directed by: Mario Piluso; Brenda Piluso (animation)
- Voices of: Alyson Stoner; Liliana Mumy; Tinashe Kachingwe
- Theme music composer: Jared Faber
- Opening theme: "Twinkle in Her Eye" performed by LeAnn Rimes
- Composers: Score: Jared Faber; Gary Lionelli; Songs: Mandy Collins; Charlotte Spencer
- Country of origin: United States
- Original language: English
- No. of seasons: 1
- No. of episodes: 8

Production
- Executive producers: Ramsey Ann Naito; Maureen Taxter; Jeff Weiss; Jeffrey Conrad; Tamra Knepfer; David Polter
- Producers: Mario Piluso; Dina Buteyn (line, episodes 1–4)
- Running time: 44 minutes
- Production companies: American Greetings; Nickelodeon Animation Studio

Original release
- Network: Nickelodeon (Nick Jr.); Noggin
- Release: February 10, 2006 – February 3, 2009

Related
- Holly Hobbie

Holly Hobbie & Friends is a series of American animated specials produced by Nickelodeon Animation Studio in association with American Greetings. (Note: Animation outsourced to Wang Film Productions and Toon City Animation.) It is the first series to star the Holly Hobbie doll, albeit redesigned from her traditional look, and centers on a 10-year old girl from a big city named Holly (the great-granddaughter of the original Holly Hobbie), who goes on adventures in a small country town called Clover with her two best friends Amy and Carrie forming a secret club called the Hey Girls.

The specials aired on both Nickelodeon's Nick Jr. block and the separate Noggin channel. The first special, "Surprise Party," premiered during the Nick Jr. block on February 10, 2006. Eight episodes were made in total. A line of merchandise was also produced on behalf of Nickelodeon & Viacom Consumer Products under license from American Greetings.

A video game based on the series for the Nintendo DS was released on October 8, 2007.

== Premise ==
Holly Hobbie is a 10-year-old girl from a big city. She often visits her best friends Amy Morris and Carrie Baker in a small country town called Clover. The specials feature themes like friendship, dreams, music and aspirations.

== Production and music ==
Holly Hobbie & Friends is produced by American Greetings, American Greetings Properties and Nickelodeon Animation Studio, with animation provided by Wang Film Productions and Toon City Animation. Producers on the series include Mario Piluso and Dina Buteyn. Ramsey Ann Naito, Maureen Taxter, Jeff Weiss, Jeffrey Conrad, Tamra Knepfer and David Polter served as executive producers. Voice directors of the series were Charlie Adler and Mario Piluso.

According to American Greetings, the intention was for Holly to "look pretty much the same, but with new, contemporary colors and patterns."

All of the series' music composed by Jared Faber and Gary Lionelli. Country singer songwriter LeAnn Rimes performed the series' theme song "Twinkle in Her Eye" and lyrics by Kate Boutilier and Eryk Casemiro. LeAnn Rimes also voices Kelly Deegan in the Christmas episode, Christmas Wishes.

== Characters ==
=== Main ===
- Holly Hobbie (voiced by Alyson Stoner in episodes 1-4 and Nicole Bouma in episodes 5-8) is the protagonist of the series and a kindhearted girl with long blonde hair and blue eyes. She likes to do cartwheels and design her own clothes. Holly and her friends are part of a secret club called the Hey Girls Club. She also likes to draw on a journal for her adventures. She has a Cocker Spaniel named Doodles.
- Amy Morris (voiced by Liliana Mumy in episodes 1-4 and Maryke Hendrikse in episodes 5-8) is a silly and imaginative girl with short brown hair and green eyes. She likes to daydream and ride horses. She has her own horse named Cider and a pig named Cheddar.
- Carrie Baker (voiced by Tinashe Kachingwe in episodes 1-4 and Dorla Bell in episodes 5-8) is a smart and determined African American girl with dark brown hair and brown eyes. She’s the most straight-laced and sensible of the Hey Girls, and she often acts the voice of reason.

=== Supporting ===
==== Kids ====
- Robby Hobbie (voiced by Jansen Panettiere in episodes 1-4 and Kelly Metzger in episodes 5-8) is Holly's 8-year-old little brother. He can be a little annoying and weird at times.
- Kyle Morris (voiced by Paul Butcher) is Amy's younger brother and Robby's best friend. He hangs out with Robby most of the time.
- Devon (voiced by Kim Mai Guest) is a teenage girl and an honorary member of the Hey Girls Club. She works as a waitress at Aunt Jessie's Café. She studies the ocean in college.
- Joey and Paul Deegan (voiced by Spencer Ganus and Harrison Fahn).
- Portia (voiced by Kathleen Barr) is Holly's friend in New York City. She can be a little bit bossy and snobby but she has a good heart and loves fashion.
- K.T. McGee (voiced by Kathleen Barr) is Holly's friend in Clover School.

==== Adults ====
- Aunt Jessie (voiced by Rusty Schwimmer in episodes 1-4 and Heather Doerksen in episodes 5-8) is Holly's aunt who runs a café. She has a cat named Bonnet.
- Uncle Dave (voiced by Diedrich Bader in episodes 1-4 and Brian Dobson in episodes 5-8) is Holly's uncle.
- Joan Hobbie (voiced by Jane Lynch in episodes 1-4 and Saffron Henderson in episodes 5-8) is Holly's mom.
- Gary Hobbie (voiced by Rob Paulsen in episodes 1-4 and Ian Corlett in episodes 5-8) is Holly's dad.
- Jim Bidderman (voiced by Michael McShane).
- Willie Scranton (voiced by Dee Bradley Baker).
- Bud Morris (voiced by Bill Mumy) is Amy's dad.
- Teresa Morris (voiced by Molly Hagan) is Amy's mom.
- Carolyn Baker (voiced by Dawnn Lewis) is Carrie's mom.
- Kelly Deegan (voiced by LeAnn Rimes) is a widowed mother.
- Annabelle Crow (voiced by Marion Ross) is a town witch and old lady.
- Mayor Whitman (voiced by Maurice LaMarche) is a mayor of the country town Clover.
- Andy Lieberman (voiced by Maurice LaMarche) is Uncle Dave's friend.

== Episodes ==
No.	Title	Directed by	Written by	Original release date
1	"Surprise Party"	Mario Piluso	Kate Boutilier and Eryk Casemiro	February 10, 2006 (TV); March 7, 2006 (DVD)
Holly visits Clover to plan a surprise birthday party for her Aunt Jessie. While there, she plays a prank on Robby by cutting fake crop circles in a corn patch, making him think aliens made them.
2	"Christmas Wishes"	Mario Piluso	Kate Boutilier and Eryk Casemiro	October 24, 2006 (DVD); November 13, 2006 (TV)
Holly and her friends take part in a play that retells the story of Christmas and they bring Christmas cheer to a widowed mother and her twin sons. Meanwhile, Robby dresses up as Santa to earn some extra money.
3	"Secret Adventures"	Mario Piluso	Kate Boutilier and Eryk Casemiro	February 16, 2007 (TV); February 20, 2007 (DVD)
Holly, Amy and Carrie help Holly's mom and Aunt Jessie gather sap for the family's famous maple syrup recipe. When they accidentally spill it, they are all afraid to tell the truth.
4	"Best Friends Forever"	Mario Piluso	Kate Boutilier and Eryk Casemiro; Mario Piluso (additional material)	September 7, 2007 (TV); September 18, 2007 (DVD)
Holly and her friends meet Mrs. Annabelle Crow, the "town witch" who's actually a nice old lady. When they find out that Annabelle's house is set to be demolished, they come up with a way to save it.
5–6	"Inside Out"	Mario Piluso; Brenda Piluso (animation)	Mario and Brenda Piluso (story); Cliff Ruby and Elana Lesser (script)	August 12, 2008 (DVD)
5–6	"Hats Off"	Mario Piluso; Brenda Piluso (animation)	Mario and Brenda Piluso (story); Cliff Ruby and Elana Lesser (script)	August 12, 2008 (DVD)
Holly and her friend from the city, Portia, visit Clover to attend a library auction. However, Portia ends up being mean to Amy and Carrie. Amy and Carrie come to visit Holly in New York City, but Carrie feels homesick from the countryside.
7–8	"Cover Girl"	Mario Piluso; Brenda Piluso (animation)	Mario and Brenda Piluso (story); Cliff Ruby and Elana Lesser (script)	February 3, 2009 (DVD)
7–8	"Reboot"	Mario Piluso; Brenda Piluso (animation)	Mario and Brenda Piluso (story); Cliff Ruby and Elana Lesser (script)	February 3, 2009 (DVD)
Holly moves to Clover, but when she starts school, she gets assigned to a different class than Amy and Carrie. There, Holly meets a shy girl named K.T. McGee who's constantly picked on by her classmates. The school is holding an open house. Holly, Amy and Carrie encourage their new friend K.T. McGee to submit her idea for the student award show.

== Broadcast ==
The first special, "Surprise Party," premiered on February 10, 2006, while the fourth special, "Best Friends Forever," premiered on September 7, 2007. In addition to the Nick Jr. block, the series aired on Noggin from December 22, 2006 to 2007.

== Home media ==
All of the episodes that aired on Nick Jr. and Noggin have been released on DVD. Surprise Party was also released on VHS and was the only special released on both formats by Paramount Home Entertainment. Paramount Home Entertainment originally planned to release Christmas Wishes; however, in June 2006, American Greetings restricted its licensing agreement with Nickelodeon, which resulted in Paramount Home Entertainment's rights to the series being terminated. Immediately afterwards, American Greetings secured a deal that called for Sony Wonder, then still a subdivision of Sony BMG Music Entertainment, to secure the home video distribution rights to the series. This agreement continued with Sony Pictures Home Entertainment after Sony Wonder's ownership shifted to it from Sony BMG in 2007.

Two more DVDs, each featuring two twenty-two minute episodes, were also released: Fabulous Fashion Show, which includes "Inside Out" and "Hats Off", and Marvelous Makeover, which includes "Cover Girl" and "Reboot".

== Video game ==
A video game based on the series for the Nintendo DS released on October 8, 2007. The game was developed by FrontLine Studios and published by Majesco.

== Reception ==
The specials received positive reviews. Regina McMenomy, a researcher at Washington State University specializing in female pop culture, praised how Holly embraces her girlishness while still being a "strong, independent" thinker. In comparison, "so many [other] newer girl characters focus on power and gender equality that they've lost their femininity," said McMenomy. Writing for The World, Jacqueline Cutler said that the show keeps the "sweet spirit" of the original Holly Hobbie brand. She also said that it would connect to its target audience: "If you're a traditional little girl and love copious amounts of sugar and everything cute, then Nickelodeon's Holly Hobbie & Friends airing Monday, Nov. 13, is for you." The Dove Foundation awarded the series its "Dove Family-Approved Seal" and wrote that "Holly Hobbie is a wonderful role model for children and adults. She has a way of brightening your day."

== See also ==
- Holly Hobbie (TV series)
