= Dan Reynolds (cartoonist) =

American cartoonist

- Occupation: Cartoonist
- Writing career
- Notable work: Reader's Digest
- Website: reynoldsunwrapped.wixsite.com/mysite

Dan Reynolds (born July 26, 1960) began drawing cartoons in December 1989 at the age of twenty-nine. His work is seen nationally on greeting cards with the American Greetings brands Recycled Paper Greetings and Papyrus Greetings, as well as in Reader's Digest.

== Cartoons ==
Reynolds is best known for his cartoon series, Reynolds Unwrapped.

His work appears in almost every issue of Reader's Digest (where he is known for his cow, pig and chicken cartoons) and in stores featuring greeting cards published by American Greetings (Recycled Paper Greetings and Papyrus Greetings), Design Design and NobleWorks.

Reynolds' work also appeared in the opening episode of the 2002 episode of HBO's The Sopranos and the cover of a National Lampoon cartoon book collection. His baseball cartoons are in the National Baseball Hall of Fame and Museum in Cooperstown, New York.

Reynolds spent four years in the Navy on the USS Nimitz, has a degree in psychology and currently lives in central New York state with his wife and sons.
