= Toot & Puddle =

Toot & Puddle may refer to:

- Toot & Puddle, a book series by Holly Hobbie
- Toot & Puddle (TV series), a TV series produced in 2008 that aired on Noggin
