= Papyrus (company) =

American stationery and greeting card retailer

- Company type: Private
- Industry: Stationery; Greeting card; Retail
- Founded: 1973
- Founder: Margrit Schurman
- Fate: Closed in 2020
- Headquarters: Goodlettsville, Tennessee, U.S.
- Area served: North America
- Key people: Dominique Schurman (CEO)
- Products: Greeting cards; Stationery; Custom printing; Gifts; Journals; Gift wrap
- Parent: Schurman Retail Group
- Website: www.papyrusonline.com

Papyrus (stylized as PAPYRUS) is a brand name originated by a former American stationery and greeting card retailer that at one time operated over 450 stores throughout the United States and Canada. It was headquartered in Goodlettsville, Tennessee, and was the flagship brand of the Schurman Retail Group. The company sold a variety of products, including greeting cards, stationery, gift wrap, specialty gifts, jewelry, customized invitations, and other paper products. It was one of the largest greeting card retailers in the United States. The Papyrus products rights are owned by American Greetings.

== History ==
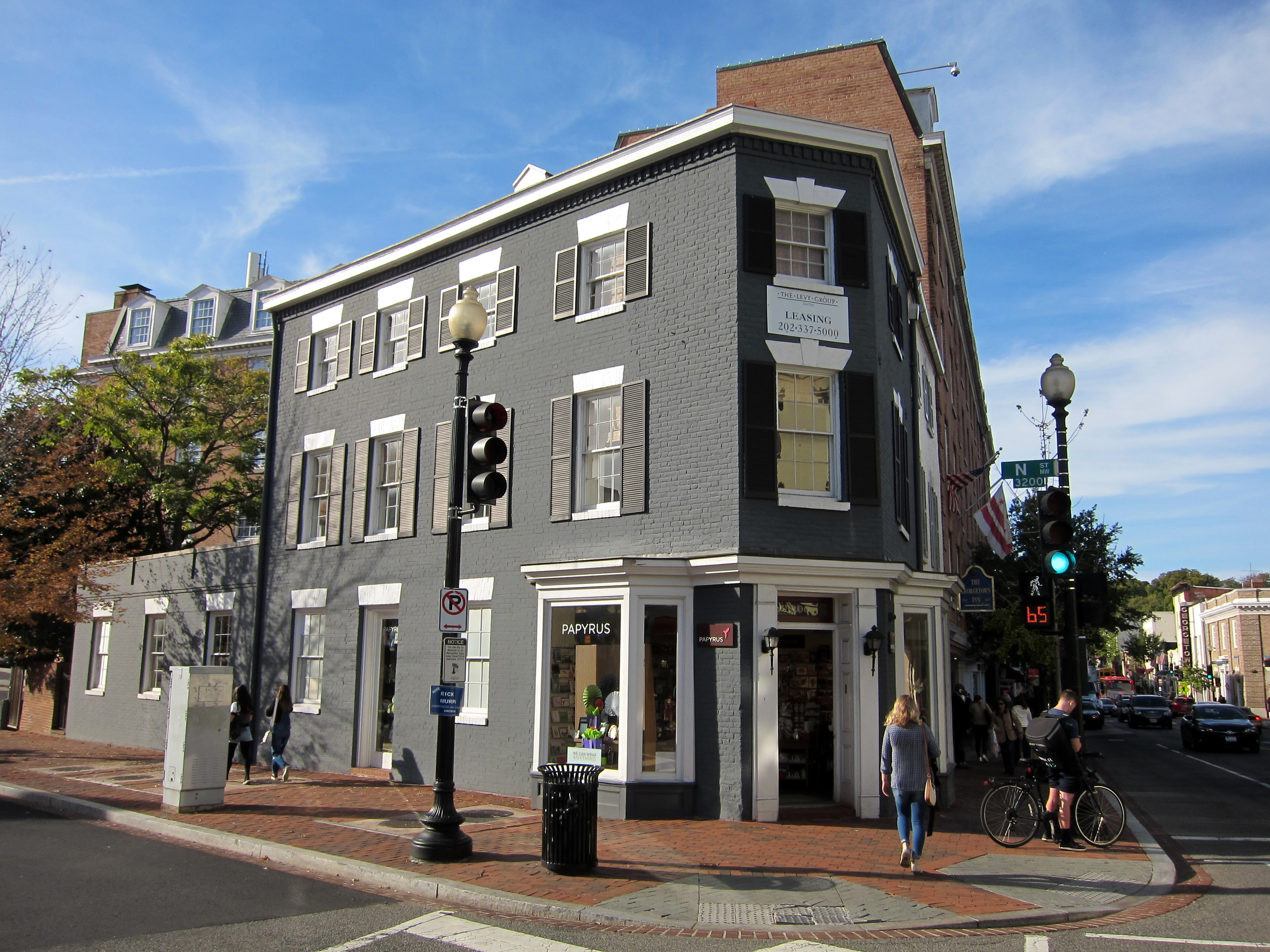
Papyrus store in Washington, D.C.

The first Papyrus retail shop was opened in 1973 by Margrit Schurman in Berkeley, California. It began as the retail wing of Schurman Fine Papers (now, the Schurman Retail Group). The original store was opened for less than $1,000 and featured a variety of fine art-inspired greeting cards, postcards, and other paper products. Over the next five years, more Papyrus stores opened around the United States, and the company soon began selling franchises. In the 1980s, the company began domestic production of Papyrus products.

In 1991, Dominique Schurman became the CEO of Schurman Fine Papers and Papyrus. At that time, there were around 37 Papyrus stores nationwide, and the company was bringing in $10 million per year. By 2005, the company operated around 146 Papyrus retail shops. In 2009, Papyrus's parent company, Schurman Retail Group, purchased all 346 American Greetings retail shops. A number of these stores were eventually rebranded as Papyrus stores.

By January 2020, all 260 remaining Papyrus and other Schurman retail stores were closed, and liquidation sales began in all stores under the management of Gordon Brothers. 30 of their closed stores were picked up by Paper Source two months later.

== Products ==
Papyrus sold a variety of luxury paper products including a selection of stationery and greeting cards. The chain is perhaps best known for its high-end greeting cards that often incorporated items like buttons, fabric, leather, zippers, glitter, and other embellishments. The stores also offered products like journals, note cards, gift wrap, and customized invitations. Through the NIQUEA.D brand, Papyrus sold a selection of gifts, jewelry, and other fashion accessories. Other brands sold in Papyrus stores included American Greetings and Carlton Cards. The Papyrus logo is a distinct pink hummingbird and can be found on a variety of Papyrus products.
