= Jenny Ming =

CEO

- Born: Jenny Ming; 1955 (age 70–71); Canton, China
- Education: San José State University
- Occupation: Retail fashion executive
- Board member of: Levi Strauss & Co., Poshmark

Jenny Ming (born 1955) is a retail fashion industry executive who served as the president and chief executive officer of Charlotte Russe Holding Inc. from 2009 to 2019. From 1999 to 2006, Ming was president of Old Navy, a $6.7 billion business segment of Gap Inc., where she oversaw all aspects of Old Navy and its 900 retail clothing stores in the United States and Canada.

== Early life and education ==
Ming was born in China and raised in San Francisco. In middle school, she took an interest in home economics and intended to major in it in college. However, her school soon canceled the program. After starting to take merchandising, marketing, and fashion design classes, in 1978, she earned a Bachelor of Arts in clothing merchandising with a minor in marketing from San José State University. In May 2012, Ming delivered the keynote address at San José State University's spring commencement ceremony and received an honorary doctor of humane letters from the university.

== Career ==
Ming's career began in management at a Mervyn's department store before she was personally recruited by Gap CEO Mickey Drexler in 1986. Ming joined the San Francisco-based retailer as a buyer, and quickly worked her way up through the Gap management ranks, becoming a vice president after three years on the job.

In 1994, Drexler assigned Ming to a new executive team that would oversee a planned Gap spin-off, to be called Old Navy. In 1996, Ming became executive vice president of merchandising for the chain and was named president in March 1999.

Business Week magazine named Ming one of the nation's top-25 managers in 2000. She also appeared in Fortune magazine's 2003 and 2004 lists of the 50 most powerful women in American business.

== Board activities ==
According to Forbes.com, Ming has served on several boards, including Levi Strauss & Co., Poshmark, Paper Source, and Kaiser Permanente.

- Board of directors of Levi Strauss & Co.
- Board of directors of Poshmark
- Board of directors of Paper Source
- Board of directors of Affirm (company)
- Former board of directors of Kaiser Permanente
