= Sarah Kay =

Sarah Kay may refer to:

- Sarah Kay (professor of French)
- Sarah Kay (poet)
- Vivien Kubbos's nom de plume

== See also ==
- Sara Kay, Canadian casting director
