= Vivien Kubbos =

Vivien Kubbos is a retired Australian illustrator who has sold works under the pseudonym Sarah Kay.

Kubbos created the Sarah Kay character in the 1970s, naming it after herself. Sarah was her father's pet name for her, and Kay is the initial of her last name. The folk art illustrations have "charm and innocence", and depict pastoral scenes of young characters exploring nature in patched clothing.

Australian printing company Valentine Sands purchased the Sarah Kay portfolio and still own it. The works were also licensed in Europe and Latin America.

Under her own name, Kubbos has illustrated books for young readers, such as Jeanne Betancourt's Pony Pals series for Scholastic.

== See also ==
- Holly Hobbie
- Denise Holly Hobbie
