= Holly Hobbie (character) =

American fictional character and doll

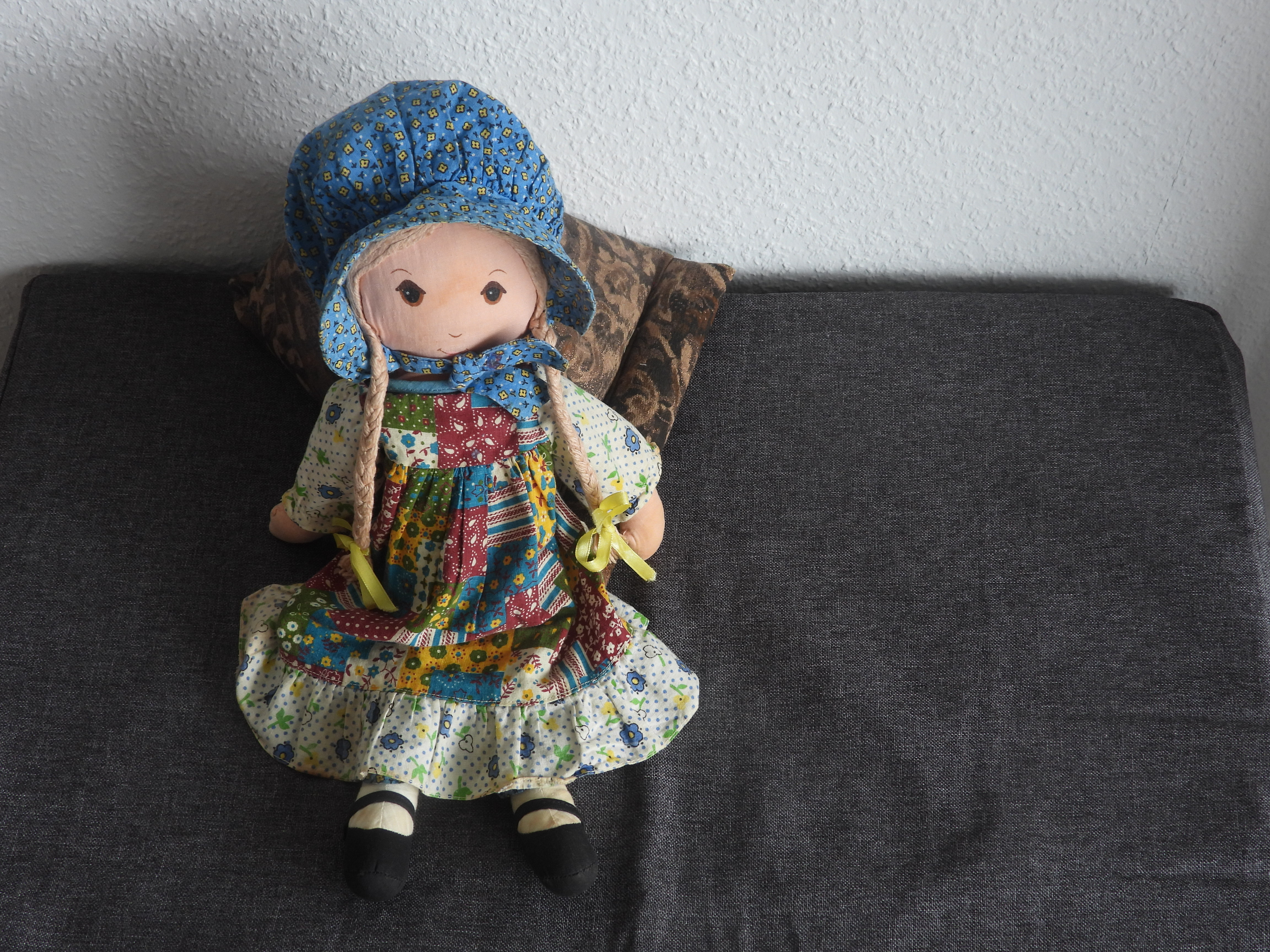
Holly Hobbie doll

Holly Hobbie is a fictional character and children's toy created by American painter and illustrator Denise Holly Hobbie.

== Origin ==
In the late 1960s, at the encouragement of her brother-in-law, Hobbie sold distinctive artwork of a cat-loving, rag dress-wearing little girl in a giant bonnet to American Greetings in Cleveland, Ohio. The artwork, based on Hobbie's own children and with rustic New England style of a bygone era, became popular, and her originally nameless character (identified earlier as "blue girl") became known as Holly Hobbie. As a contract artist, Hobbie worked with the Humorous Planning department at American Greetings under art director Rex Connors, who was responsible for launching "blue girl" as the most identifiable of the Hobbie characters.

== Doll and other product licensing ==
Also working in Humorous Planning at that time (1973–74) was Bob Childers, a veteran humorous concept artist and designer. Childers insisted that there should be a doll of the character. Since no one seemed to listen, Childers went home and, on his own time, hand-stitched the first prototype and presented it to Connors, who took the cloth doll to Tom Wilson, Creative Vice President. American Greetings approached Knickerbocker Toy Company concerning the Holly Hobbie license. In 1974, Knickerbocker Toys licensed the Holly Hobbie character for a line of rag dolls, launched in 1975. These were a popular toy for young American girls for several years. Additional products were licensed and produced, including fabrics, furniture, ceramics, games, and stationery. Holly Hobbie products were later marketed by American Greetings in association with Carlton Cards.

In 1976, Coleco produced a toy oven similar to Kenner's Easy-Bake Oven called the Holly Hobbie Oven. It was shaped like an old-fashioned wood-powered cookstove, used an incandescent light bulb for heat, and came with packaged mixes that could also be bought separately.

In 1980, Holly was featured in The Adventures of Holly Hobbie, a novel by Richard Dubelman. In this book, Holly Hobbie is a ghost who lives in a painting from 1803. She comes out of the painting to help a descendant, Liz Dutton, find her missing father, an archaeologist who has vanished in Guatemala.

== Updated versions ==
Beginning in 1989 and into the 1990s, Holly Hobbie dolls were produced by Tomy. Knickerbocker Toys also began producing dolls, but these were vinyl doll heads with soft bodies, unlike the original cloth dolls (rag dolls).

In 2006, a redesigned Holly Hobbie was introduced with the launch of Holly Hobbie & Friends, a series of specials that were broadcast on Nickelodeon's Nick Jr. block and the separate Noggin channel. They were also released on DVD. The traditional line still exists, with the back story that the "original" Holly is the great-great-grandmother of the "new" Holly.

Concurrently, Mattel released an updated Holly Hobbie doll line, which includes Holly (blue eyes and blonde hair), Amy (green eyes and red hair), and Carrie (brown eyes and black hair). The dolls feature all-new face sculpts, a new body style, and flat feet. There is also a series of smaller Holly, Amy, and Carrie figures; each of these figures includes a companion animal: Holly a Cocker Spaniel named Doodles, Amy a pig named Cheddar, and Carrie a cat named Bonnet. Separate doll outfits were available, and each outfit could be customized. Porcelain dolls were available, made by the Ashton-Drake company.

The specials feature songs with music and lyrics written by lead guitarist Sheriff Mandy Collins and keyboardist Charlotte Spencer of the English rock group the Hyper Girls. The cartoon features three pop songs, two sung in her own voice, "Just Like You" and "The Things That Make You Special." LeAnn Rimes sings the third song, "Twinkle in Her Eye," the show's theme song.

In fall 2018, Family Channel and Hulu released an updated live-action series simply titled Holly Hobbie. It features Ruby Jay as thirteen-year-old Holly Hobbie, a country girl who enjoys playing the guitar, hailing from a small town and seeking to save her grandmother's Calico Café. The series draws loosely upon past elements created for the Holly Hobbie franchise, but includes modern elements, such as Holly's use of a crowdfunding page.

== Works ==
=== TV Series ===
==== Holly Hobbie & Friends ====
A series of specials starring the Holly Hobbie character. The DVD releases were:

- Holly Hobbie & Friends: Surprise Party (7 March 2006)
- Holly Hobbie & Friends: Christmas Wishes (24 October 2006)
- Holly Hobbie & Friends: Secret Adventures (6 March 2007)
- Holly Hobbie & Friends: Best Friends Forever (18 September 2007)
- Holly Hobbie & Friends: Fabulous Fashion Show (12 August 2008)
- Holly Hobbie & Friends: Marvelous Makeover (3 February 2009)
- Holly Hobbie & Friends: Hey Girls! Fun Pack (12 August 2008)

==== Holly Hobbie ====
A live-action series starring the Holly Hobbie character that aired from November 16, 2018 until September 20, 2022.

=== Books ===
- The Art of Holly Hobbie (1980)
- Holly Hobbie's the night before Christmas (1976)
