= Schurman Retail Group =

- Type: Private
- Industry: Stationery
- Founded: 1950
- Founder: Marcel Schurman; Margrit Schurman
- Headquarters: Fairfield, California, U.S.
- Area served: Worldwide
- Key people: Dominique Schurman (CEO)
- Products: Greeting cards; Stationery; Custom printing; Gifts; Journals; Gift wrap
- Brands: Papyrus; American Greetings; Carlton Cards; Niquea.d; Paper Destiny
- Owner: Schurman family American Greetings (15%)
- Website: www.srgretail.com

Schurman Retail Group is an American stationery, greeting card, gifts, and paper products company based in Fairfield, California. The company operates brands and retail stores under the names Papyrus, NIQUEA.D, and Paper Destiny. It also sells the American Greetings brand and manages its subsidiaries, including Carlton Cards (in Canada and the U.S.). Schurman Retail Group has over 450 retail stores across the United States and Canada and is currently the second-largest American specialty retailer in the greeting card industry.

== History ==
=== Schurman Fine Papers ===
The company was founded in 1950 by Marcel and Margrit Schurman in their Berkeley, California kitchen. It was originally known as Schurman Fine Papers and operated as a wholesaler, importing fine art-inspired greeting cards, stationery, and other paper products from Europe. The Schurmans would sell the imported paper products to local gift and book shops. In its first year of operation, the company earned $20,000. It earned its first $1 million in 1961, and, by 1965, it had a warehouse and several employees.

In 1973, Margrit Schurman opened the first Papyrus retail store in Berkeley to exclusively sell the company's products. Over the next five years, the company opened more Papyrus retail stores across the United States and eventually opted to start selling franchises. In the 1980s, Schurman Fine Papers had salespeople and showrooms across the country and began pulling in around $10 million in annual revenue. In 1982, the Schurmans' youngest daughter and current CEO, Dominique Schurman, began working at the firm. In the 1980s, the company began domestic production of papyrus products.

Dominique Schurman became the company's vice president within a few years. When her father, Marcel, retired in 1991, Dominique took over as CEO. Her primary goal was to promote the Papyrus brand and continue to create in-house greeting cards. By 2005, Schurman had increased the number of Papyrus retail stores from 37 to 146.

=== Schurman Retail Group ===
In 2009, Schurman Retail Group sold the Papyrus brand and wholesale division to American Greetings, while buying 341 American Greetings retail outlets. In addition to the American Greetings retail stores, Schurman Retail Group also acquired Carlton Cards outlets in Canada.

Following the American Greetings deal, the company began earning $200 million in annual revenue. In 2012, American Greetings, which owns a 15% stake in Schurman Retail Group, appointed the company to manage Clintons retail stores in the U.K. The company operates over 400 retail stores in North America with brands including Papyrus, NIQUEA.D, Paper Destiny, and Carlton Cards. Due to trademark issues, Schurman Retail opened in the UK as Jolie Papier in 2014 with its first store at Bluewater Shopping Centre followed by a second location in Newcastle. In August 2017, American Greetings took back management of Clinton.

By November 2019, Schurman Retail Group was looking to get rent reductions from landlords and consider closing stores. Starting in January 2020, all 254 remaining Papyrus, Paper Destiny, Niquea D, American Greetings and Carlton Cards stores were closed. The company filed for Chapter 11 Bankruptcy.

== Brands ==
=== Papyrus ===
Papyrus is the Schurman Retail Group's flagship brand. It also operates as a retail shop with over 450 stores in the United States. It sells a variety of products including greeting cards, gift wrap, stationery, note cards, journals, customized invitations, and other gift and paper products. The first Papyrus retail store was opened in 1973 in Berkeley, California. Papyrus-branded products feature a pink hummingbird logo.

=== American Greetings ===
In 2009, the Schurman Retail Group purchased over 300 American Greetings retail shops, eventually rebranding them into Papyrus shops. Papyrus currently sells American Greetings products. Additionally, American Greetings owns a 15% stake in the Schurman Retail Group. American Greetings also owns the Carlton Cards (in Canada), the Schurman Retail Group began operating Carlton Cards shops. In 2012, American Greetings appointed Schurman Retail Group to manage the Clintons brand in the U.K.

=== Other brands ===
The Schurman Retail Group also offers several other brands including NIQUEA.D and Paper Destiny. NIQUEA.D is a line of gifts, jewelry, and other accessories that are sold at Papyrus outlets. Paper Destiny is another retail outlet that sells greeting cards, stationery, and other products. It is similar to Papyrus shops, but is considered a mid-market alternative.
