= Kate Boutilier =

American screenwriter

- Occupation: Screenwriter
- Years active: 1986–present
- Notable work: Rugrats, The Wild Thornberrys, All Grown Up!, Holly Hobbie & Friends

Kate Boutilier is an American screenwriter and producer whose credits include the animated television series Rugrats, The Wild Thornberrys, All Grown Up! and Holly Hobbie & Friends, and the feature films The Wild Thornberrys Movie, Rugrats Go Wild, and Rugrats in Paris. She co-developed and produced the series Poppy Cat and The Mr. Men Show, and co-showran the Rugrats reboot.

== Filmography ==
=== As a writer ===
- Falcon Crest (1986)
- Family Ties (1986)
- Just the Ten of Us (1988–1989)
- Baywatch (1990)
- She-Wolf of London (1991)
- Northern Exposure (1992)
- Growing Pains (1987–1989)
- Freshman Dorm (1992)
- Lois & Clark: The New Adventures of Superman (1994)
- Deadly Games (1995)
- Rugrats (1997–1998)
- The Famous Jett Jackson (1998)
- The Wild Thornberrys (1998–2000)
- Rugrats in Paris: The Movie (2000)
- The Wild Thornberrys Movie (2002)
- As Told by Ginger (2001–2002)
- Rugrats Go Wild (2003)
- All Grown Up! (2003–2007)
- Holly Hobbie & Friends (2006–2009)
- Olivia (2008–2011)
- The Mr. Men Show (2008–2009)
- Poppy Cat (2010–2014)
- Rugrats (2021–2026)
- The Unstoppable Yellow Yeti (2022)

=== As a producer ===
- Rugrats (1991–1998)
- As Told by Ginger (2002)
- Olivia (2008–2011)
- The Mr. Men Show (2008–2009)
- Poppy Cat (2010–2014)
- Lilybuds (2018–2019)
- Rugrats (2021–2026)

=== As a story editor ===
- Growing Pains (1987–1988)
- Baywatch (1990)

== Music ==
She has also written and composed songs for television and films.

- Rugrats Go Wild (2003)
- Holly Hobbie & Friends (2006–2009)

== Awards ==
| Year | Association | Award Category | Result |
|---|---|---|---|
| 2001 | Emmy Awards | Outstanding Animated Program (for As Told by Ginger) | Nominated |
| 2001 | Daytime Emmy Awards | Outstanding Children's Program (for The Wild Thornberrys) | Nominated |
| 2002 | Emmy Awards | Outstanding Children's Program (for Rugrats) | Nominated |
| 2009 | Daytime Emmy Award | Outstanding Writing in Animation (for The Mr. Men Show) | Nominated |
