= Seattle FilmWorks =

American film processing company

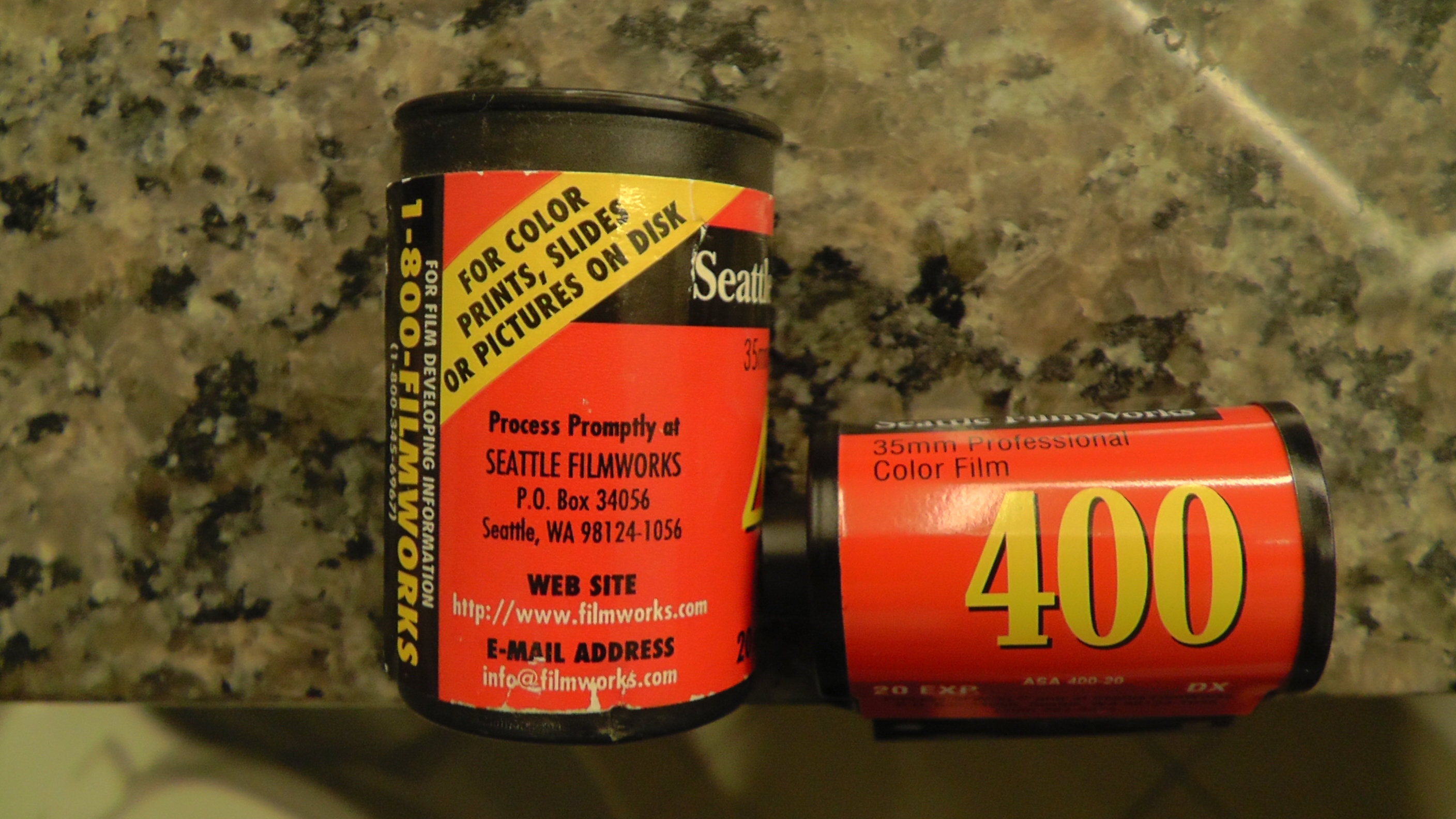

Seattle FilmWorks, Inc., was an American mail order photographic film processing company that sold re-spooled 35mm motion picture film. It was founded in 1976 as American Passage Marketing by Gilbert Scherer. At its peak in 1997, Seattle FilmWorks employed approximately 800 people and processed about 20 miles (32,000 metres) of film a day in a 65,000 sq ft (6,000 square metre) lab. In 1978, Seattle FilmWorks started selling motion picture film that is processed using Kodak's ECN-2 process. The film was loaded into 35mm film canisters for still photography use, and the company returned an unexposed roll with each order. In the 1980s, Seattle FilmWorks aggressively marketed its products and services and offered two rolls of Seattle FilmWorks film for US$2.00. It advertised in newspapers, magazines, and package inserts. Seattle FilmWorks was sold and renamed PhotoWorks in 1999. Its marketing practices led to a lawsuit against the company in 2000, which was settled a year later, and the company was later closed.

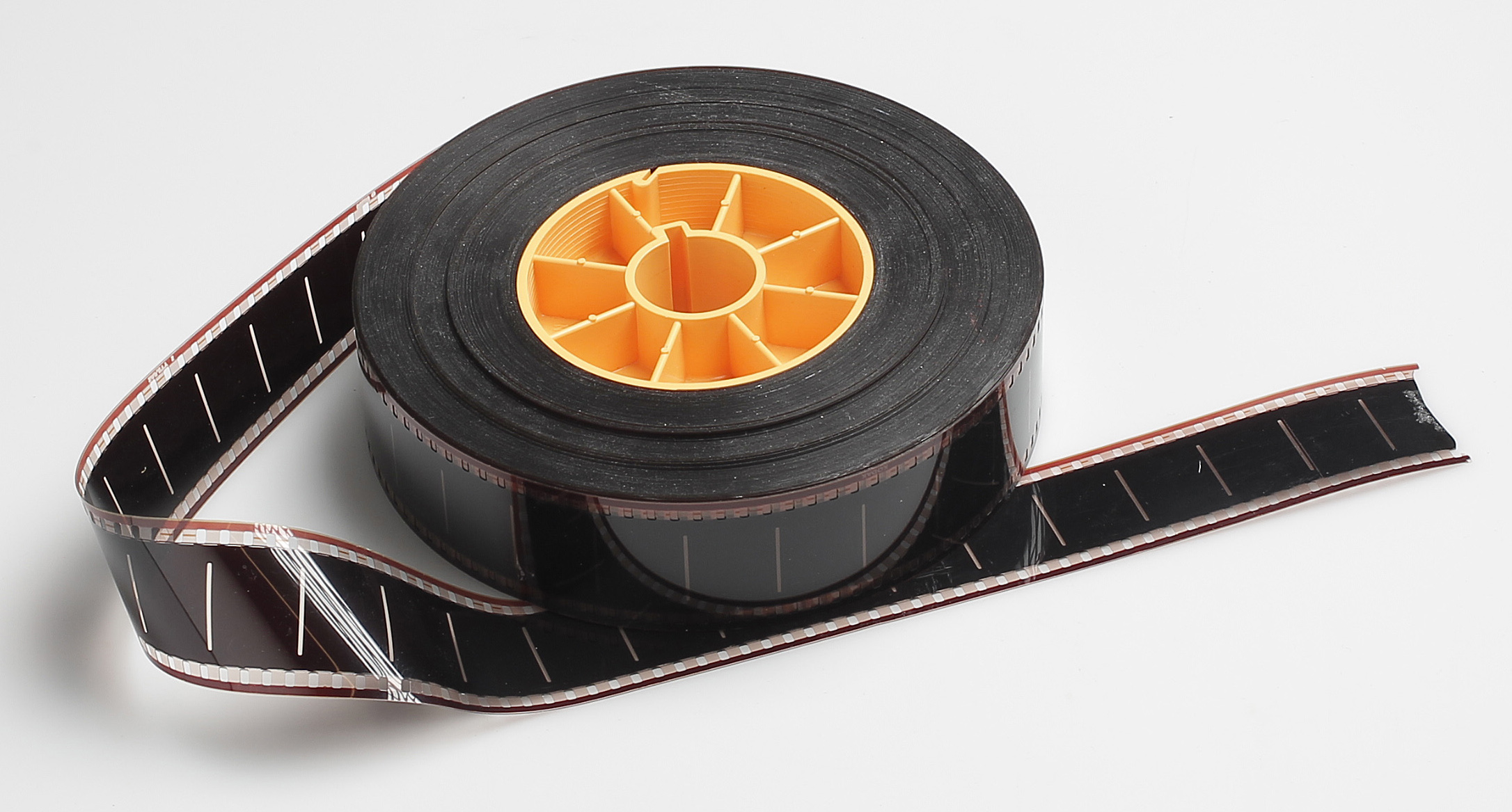
35mm motion picture film roll

== Products and services ==
Seattle FilmWorks sold movie film stock that cannot be developed at standard retail processing facilities because it must be processed in ECN-2 chemistry. Color movie film stock incorporates rem-jet, a black carbon backing on the film base that must be removed before the film is developed. ECN-2 also differs from C-41, the standard color negative stock for stills photography, because it uses a different color developing agent. Seattle FilmWorks designated the process as SFW-XL.

In the mid '90s, Seattle FilmWorks began to re-package standard C-41 processed films while keeping the SFW-XL process designation—these films were able to be processed at all C-41 capable photo labs; however because of the SFW-XL designation many would not unless they were willing to inspect the film and verify that it did not have the ECN-2 rem-jet backing (which cannot be processed on C-41 equipment without damaging the entire batch of film in the machines). Seattle FilmWorks also offered "prints and slides from the same roll", using cinema print film to create slides from the original negatives. These slides fade quickly when not properly stored, and are generally of inferior quality when compared to standard E6 or K-14 processed slides.

Seattle FilmWorks offered the option of digitizing images at the time of processing, the files being in proprietary file formats; a *.sfw format for pictures returned on floppy disk and *.pwp format if downloaded on the Internet. In January 2000, the company entered an agreement with AT&T WorldNet Services that allowed 1.8 million AT&T customers to access Seattle FilmWorks' website, called PhotoWorks. Customers could view personal photographs, send them by e-mail and add them to websites. AT&T WorldNet's customers were also offered free processing of their first roll of film and free archiving of digital images on the PhotoWorks' website when ordering prints.

Other companies continue to offer full-service ECN-2 processing and positive services; some use ECN-2 chemistry, but others develop in C-41. Motion picture processing labs all use ECN-2 chemistry compatible with this film.

The company was known for running their computer operations on a main frame computer system that utilized an Ultimate operating system (also known as PICK), an early computer system similar to typical SQL database server systems that operate today. As was the case with the Seattle First National Bank Capital Management Project (using the same operating system) during the mid to late 1980s, this computer system was known to be very unreliable, with hard drive crashes and various indexing problems during downtime (as a result of lengthy recovery procedures) that resulted in database management and I.T. management problems (see Oregon State University case study on the Seattle First National Bank Capital Management Project for details), but the company was more successful in its applications than Seafirst before the system was discontinued in 1999.

== Fate ==
Seattle FilmWorks was renamed PhotoWorks.com. In 2000, six plaintiffs took legal action against PhotoWorks at King County Superior Court, Seattle. The action alleged that FilmWorks had engaged in deceptive practices as its film could only be developed by the company and that 'free' rolls of film were actually charged for. The company settled the claims out-of-court, and promised to give 900,000 free rolls of C-41 film to its customers within one year and 300,000 rolls to customers that did not qualify as part of the first group but who requested a roll in the following six months. PhotoWorks also agreed to stop claiming its film could only be developed by PhotoWorks. In 2001, PhotoWorks operated 35 retail outlets, but began closing them as it concentrated upon its mail order and internet business. By August 2003, only eight of these outlets remained when the company announced that these would be closed by the end of September 2003. PhotoWorks discontinued all film processing in 2010 after it was purchased by American Greetings. American Greetings ceased all PhotoWorks operations in April 2011 and sold its remnants, including its customer accounts, to Shutterfly.

== See also ==
- Color photography
- Color motion picture film
- Film base
- Film stock
- List of motion picture film stocks
- History of the camera
- History of photography
- Color print film
