= Recycled Paper Greetings =

Greeting card company based in Chicago, USA

Recycled Paper Greetings, Inc.
- Company type: Subsidiary
- Industry: Greeting cards
- Founded: 1971; 55 years ago, in Chicago, Illinois
- Founder: Phil Friedmann; Mike Keiser
- Headquarters: Chicago, Illinois, USA
- Parent: American Greetings
- Website: www.prgreetings.com

Recycled Paper Greetings, Inc. (RPG) is a Chicago-based greeting card company founded by Phil Friedmann and Mike Keiser in 1971. They became successful as one of the first greeting card companies to print their product on recycled paper, and to give their artists recognition by putting their names on the cards.

The designs created by Sandra Boynton became very well known, especially her "Hippo Birdie Two Ewes" birthday card. These design styles were eventually adopted by the competition and are common today.

Artists like Bald Guy Greetings (Ian Kalman and Sean Farrell), Across The Line Products, Mary Melcher, Cynthia Bainton (granddaughter of Roland Bainton), John Richard Allen, the Bjorkman Brothers, Kathy Davis, Dan Reynolds, David Walker, Susan Allen, Vicky Barone and cartoonist Cathy Guisewite also produce or have produced greeting cards through RPG.

The Product Development Group of Andrews McMeel Publishing also contributes significantly to the RPG offering through a line of original concepts called Zero Gravity and well-known licenses like Napoleon Dynamite, Little Miss Sunshine and the Close to Home cartoon panel.

American Greetings acquired Recycled Paper Greetings in 2009.

== Sources ==
- Michael Kinsley (5 January 2009). Creative Capitalism. Simon & Schuster. pp. 61–. ISBN 978-1-84737-629-9.
