= Charlotte Russe (retailer) =

Clothing retail chain store

Charlotte Russe, Inc.
- Type: Subsidiary
- Industry: Retail
- Founded: 1975; 51 years ago (original); Carlsbad, California, U.S.
- Founder: Daniel Lawrence
- Headquarters: Toronto, Ontario, Canada
- Number of locations: 196 (Sept 2023)
- Products: Clothing, footwear, and accessories for women
- Parent: YM Inc.
- Website: www.charlotterusse.com

Charlotte Russe Inc. is an American clothing retail chain store that operates in the United States, headquartered in San Francisco, California. Fashions in the stores are targeted at women in their teens and twenties. As of July 2026, Charlotte Russe operates 223 stores, mostly in malls and shopping centers.

== History ==
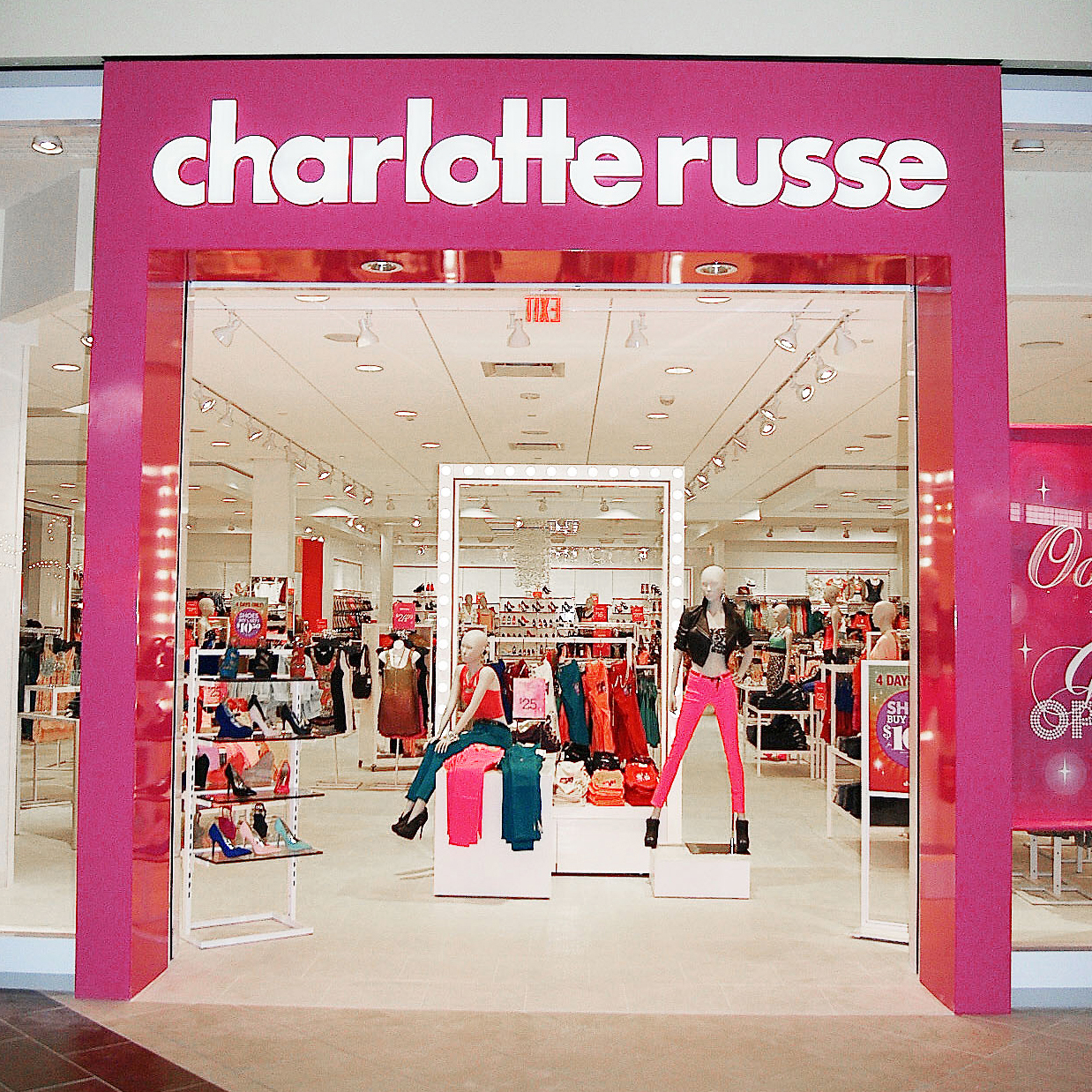
Charlotte Russe store front

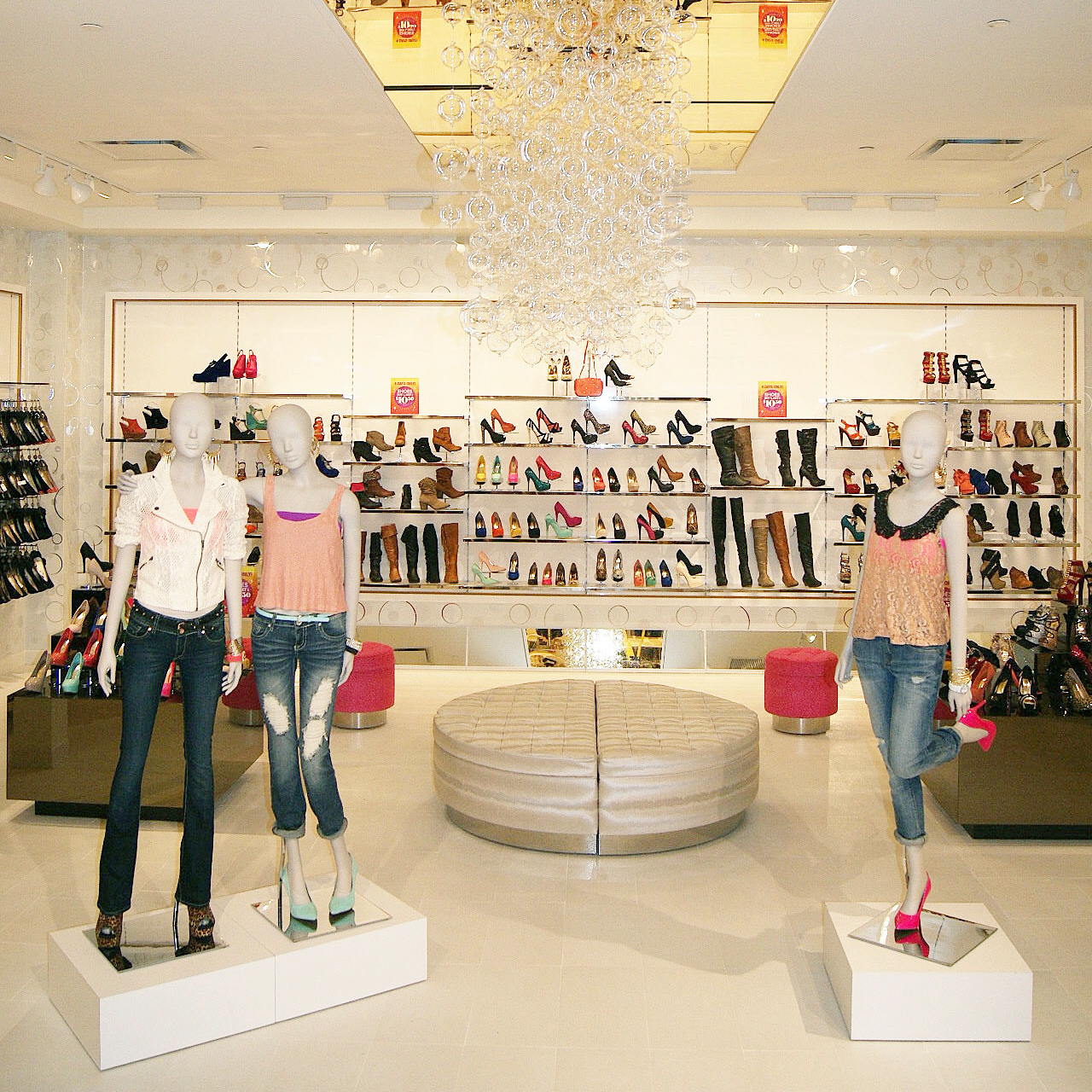
Charlotte Russe shoe display

Charlotte Russe was founded in 1975 by Daniel Lawrence and his two brothers, all of whom worked in their family's Brooklyn, New York clothing business. Lawrence and his siblings formed Lawrence Merchandising Corp. in Carlsbad, California. With the first Charlotte Russe storefront in San Diego, California, other locations were established throughout the 1970s and early 1980s.

The company was acquired in 1996 by the investment firm SKM (Saunders Karp & Megrue). The new owners had expansion plans for Charlotte Russe - evolving it into a national chain of shopping mall stores. SKM took Charlotte Russe public in 1999 until Advent International acquired it in 2009. As President and CEO, Jenny Ming led Charlotte Russe into a private holding once again.

On January 4, 2019, Charlotte Russe warned it may not be able to continue its operations without a restructuring plan, which could include a possible sale of its assets or a Chapter 11 bankruptcy filing. This came only a year after it restructured its debt by making agreements with its lenders. The company claimed that it would be working with Guggenheim Partners to work on its future. On February 4, 2019, Charlotte Russe filed for Chapter 11 bankruptcy with plans to close 94 underperforming stores. A decline in consumer demand and rising debt were additional contributing factors to its bankruptcy. The company had plans to emerge from bankruptcy once it sold itself to new owners and a more maintained store count.

However, on March 7, 2019, SB360 Capital Partners won an auction to acquire all of Charlotte Russe's inventory and additional assets for $160 million after a U.S. bankruptcy judge approved the sale. SB360 Capital Partners did not have interest in continuing Charlotte Russe's operations, so it was ultimately announced that the company would shut down and close all of its 418 remaining locations, as well as all 10 of its Peek Kids stores, by the end of April. Liquidation sales began at all locations immediately after the announcement, with gift cards expiring by March 21, 2019. On March 29, 2019, Charlotte Russe sold Peek Kids to Mamiye Brothers for an undisclosed amount. Mamiye Brothers announced that it would continue operating Peek Kids online, whereas all of the physical locations would still be permanently closed.

In April 2019, Charlotte Russe was acquired by the Toronto-based retailer YM Inc.. Under YM Inc. Charlotte Russe has expanded its retail footprint and caters primarily to the Generation Z demographic. By the end of 2019, there were 183 stores with additional planned.
