= Rugrats (2021 TV series) =

American animated television series (2021–2027)

- Genre: Comedy; Adventure; Slice of life
- Created by: Arlene Klasky; Gábor Csupó; Paul Germain
- Based on: Rugrats by: Arlene Klasky; Gábor Csupó; Paul Germain
- Showrunners: Kate Boutilier; Eryk Casemiro
- Voices of: E. G. Daily; Nancy Cartwright; Cheryl Chase; Kath Soucie; Cree Summer
- Theme music composer: Mark Mothersbaugh
- Composers: Mark Mothersbaugh; Bob Mothersbaugh
- Country of origin: United States
- Original language: English
- No. of seasons: 3
- No. of episodes: 64

Production
- Executive producers: Arlene Klasky; Gábor Csupo; Paul Germain; Kate Boutilier; Eryk Casemiro
- Running time: 22 minutes
- Production companies: Klasky Csupo; Nickelodeon Animation Studio

Original release
- Network: Paramount+
- Release: May 27, 2021 – April 14, 2023
- Network: Nicktoons
- Release: March 14 – March 22, 2024
- Network: Nickelodeon Global
- Release: June 1 – June 14, 2026

Related
- All Grown Up!

Rugrats is an American animated television series created by Arlene Klasky, Gábor Csupó, and Paul Germain. It has been described as a reboot of the original TV series of the same name which aired from 1991 to 2004. The series premiered on May 27, 2021, on Paramount+; it is the second Nickelodeon-based series created for the streaming service. Unlike with previous incarnations of the franchise, the series was produced by Nickelodeon Animation Studio in association with Klasky Csupo.

On March 28, 2024, the series was removed from Paramount+ as part of a "strategic decision to focus on content with mass global appeal." Season 2 episode premieres had already moved to the Nicktoons channel on March 14, 2024, where they would continue to air until March 22, 2024. The remaining season 2 episodes would be released on DVD on October 8, 2024.

A third season was produced, but went unaired for reasons unknown. The third season would eventually premiere on Nickelodeon's international feeds on June 1, 2026.

== Premise ==
Apart from the setting update of the 2020s from the 1990s, the rebooted Rugrats remains the same as the original series, as it still focuses on the experiences of a one-year-old named Tommy Pickles and his group of playmates which includes other infants and toddlers.

== Voice cast ==
Rugrats sports a vast array of secondary and tertiary characters.

The surviving voice actors of the titular "Rugrats" reprise their roles from the original series, though the adult roles from the original series have been recast, including Betty DeVille who was originally voiced by the returning Kath Soucie.

=== Babies/Children ===
- E. G. Daily as Tommy Pickles
- Nancy Cartwright as Chuckie Finster
- Cheryl Chase as Angelica Pickles
- Kath Soucie as Phil and Lil DeVille
- Cree Summer as Susie Carmichael
- Tara Strong as Dil Pickles (Introduced in S2)
- Charlet Chung as Kimi Watanabe (Guest in S1; Recurring in S2; Main in S3)
- Anita Kalathara as Darsh Mehta (Introduced in S2; Main in S3)
- Kody Kavitha as Nyra Mehta (Introduced in S2; Main in S3)

=== Adults ===
- Tommy Dewey as Stu Pickles
- Ashley Rae Spillers as Didi Pickles
- Anna Chlumsky as Charlotte Pickles
- Timothy Simons as Drew Pickles
- Natalie Morales as Betty DeVille
- Matthew Gray Gubler as Howard Tucker
- Tony Hale as Chas Finster
- Michael McKean as Grandpa Lou Pickles
- Nicole Byer as Dr. Lucy Carmichael
- Omar Benson Miller as Randy Carmichael
- Richa Moorjani as Padam Mehta (Introduced in S2; Main in S3)
- Kal Penn as Varun Mehta (Introduced in S2; Main in S3)

=== Supporting ===
- Henry Winkler as Grandpa Boris Kropotkin
- Swoosie Kurtz as Grandma Minka Kropotkin
- Hiromi Dames as Kira Watanabe
- Alicyn Packard as Josh
- Antony Del Rio as Jonathan Kraskell
- Fred Tatasciore as Reptar and Spike
- Charlie Adler as Graham Prescott
- Ashleigh Murray as Eve
- John Omohundro as Barry
- Josh Brener as Daxton
- Telma Hopkins as Celeste
- Grey Griffin as Begley
- Kimberly Brooks as Pierce
- Raini Rodriguez as Gabi
- Táta Vega as Tia Esperanza
- James Adomian as Mr. Garth
- Jenifer Lewis as Ms. Marjorie

== Production ==
In early September 2015, it was announced on Variety that Nickelodeon may "seek to experiment with retooled versions of classics" that could include Rugrats. The following day, The Independent announced that "Rugrats could soon be back on our screens too." In July 2016, it was revealed that Nickelodeon was in talks with Klasky Csupo and Paul Germain about a possible revival of the TV series.

In late July 2016, Arlene Klasky stated that she would be willing to work on a revival of the series, along with co-creators Gabor Csupó and Paul Germain. In October 2016, a Nickelodeon senior vice president stated in response to a fan question that Rugrats was among other shows being considered for revival.

Due to the deaths of Joe Alaskey and Jack Riley in 2016, Grandpa Lou Pickles and Stu Pickles were recast and are now voiced by Michael McKean and Tommy Dewey.

In mid-July 2018, it was announced that Nickelodeon had given a series order to a 26-episode revival of the series, executive produced by Klasky, Csupó, and Germain. In May 2020, it was announced that the revival series was delayed until 2021.

In late February 2021, it was announced that the reboot would premiere on Paramount+ in late spring 2021. A sneak peek was also uploaded to social media platforms. In March, an all-new cast for the parents were revealed.

The reboot premiered on Paramount+ on May 27, 2021 and began airing on Nickelodeon on August 20, 2021. A second batch of episodes was released on October 7, 2021. Regular Nickelodeon airings began on February 25, 2022.

On September 21, 2021, the series was renewed for a 13-episode second season. The series has a holiday episode that was released on December 2, 2021.

On July 21, 2022, it was announced that an additional 13 episodes had been ordered for season two, and that the series was renewed for a 13-episode third season.

On March 16, 2023, it was announced that season two would premiere on April 14, 2023.

=== Comparisons with original series ===
As a continuity reboot, the 2021 series has differences to the original 1991 series, some of which was done to accommodate the 30-year difference between the two. The character Betty DeVille was originally portrayed as a strong feminist woman with a "weak" husband in Howard. She is now portrayed as a lesbian, and Howard is Phil and Lil's donor. Betty's voice actress, openly queer actor Natalie Morales, who uses both she/her and they/them pronouns, stated about the change that "anyone who watched the original show may have had an inkling Betty was a member of the alphabet mafia ... Betty is a single mom with her own business who has twins and still has time to hang out with her friends and her community ... examples of living your life happily and healthily as an out queer person is just such a beacon for young queer people who may not have examples of that.”"

Susie and the Carmichael family are already established as neighbors (as opposed to the 1991 series, when they debuted during its second season). Susie is also now two years old instead of three and is no longer able to talk to the adults. Charlotte Pickles also is present from the beginning; in the 1991 series, she did not appear until the second season, being an unseen character up until then. Kimi Watanabe is now three and a half years old and has already moved with her mother Kira from Paris to the United States by the time she meets the cast. Kira and Chas meet in "Lucky Smudge", when it is revealed, she won piano lessons he submitted for a raffle at a fair.

Fluffy, the cat already long belonging to Drew, Charlotte, and Angelica by the time of its first appearances in the original series, is adopted in "Fluffy Moves In" during this series.

== Episodes ==
=== Series overview ===
| Season | Segments | Episodes | | Originally released | | |
| Season | Segments | Episodes | | First released | Last released | Network |
|---|---|---|---|---|---|---|
| 1 | 44 | 24 | | May 27, 2021 | April 15, 2022 | Paramount+ |
| 2 | 24 | 26 | 13 | April 14, 2023 | | Paramount+ |
| 2 | 15 | 26 | 8 | March 14, 2024 | March 22, 2024 | Nicktoons |
| 2 | 8 | 26 | 5 | April 12, 2024 | October 8, 2024 | Digital/DVD |
| 3 | 24 | 14 | | June 1, 2026 | June 14, 2026 | Nickelodeon Global |

=== Season 1 (2021–22) ===
| No. overall | No. in season | Title | Written by | Storyboard by | Paramount+ release date | Nickelodeon air date | Prod. code | U.S. linear viewers (millions) |
|---|---|---|---|---|---|---|---|---|
| 1 | 1 | "Second Time Around" | Kate Boutilier & Eryk Casemiro | Dave Stone, Casey Burke Leonard (director) | May 27, 2021 | August 20, 2021 | 101 | 0.42 |
| 1 | 1 | "Second Time Around" | Kate Boutilier & Eryk Casemiro | Dave Stone, Casey Burke Leonard (director) | May 27, 2021 | August 20, 2021 | 102 | 0.42 |
When Tommy encourages Chuckie to be more adventurous, Chuckie accidentally swallows a worm.
| 2 | 2 | "Lady De-Clutter" | Alec Schwimmer | Dave Stone (also director) | May 27, 2021 | March 11, 2022 | 103 | 0.33 |
| 2 | 2 | "New Puppy" | Lauren Shell | Tim Prendergast, Dave Stone (director) | May 27, 2021 | March 18, 2022 | 103 | 0.39 |
A woman named Lady De-Clutter visits the Pickles' house, and the babies must hide their stuff before she takes them away as part of cleaning up the place. Stu gets an adorable puppy named "Foster" from an adoption fair, and Tommy realizes that Foster is getting all of the attention than Spike and him.
| 3 | 3 | "Tail of the Dogbot" | Allan Neuwirth | Tim Prendergast, Dave Stone (director) | May 27, 2021 | March 4, 2022 | 104 | 0.36 |
| 3 | 3 | "Jonathan for a Day" | Lauren Shell | Jackie Bae, Dave Stone (director) | May 27, 2021 | March 4, 2022 | 104 | 0.36 |
Stu creates an allergy-free dog for Chuckie, and he instantly loves the robotic dog. Angelica pretends to be Charlotte's co-worker Jonathan.
| 4 | 4 | "One Big Happy Family" | Story by : Alec Schwimmer; Written by : Jenny Jaffe | Jackie Bae, Dave Stone (director) | May 27, 2021 | February 25, 2022 | 105 | 0.41 |
| 4 | 4 | "The Last Balloon" | Sam Clarke | Rachel Tamura, Dave Stone (director) | May 27, 2021 | February 25, 2022 | 105 | 0.41 |
The Pickles family (including Didi, Stu & Tommy) head over to Angelica's house. During this, Angelica and Tommy play in her room, until Chuckie comes over. Chuckie gets the last balloon from a vegetable stand. However, Chuckie realizes that he might have to loose the last balloon on earth, so he tries to jump into the sky naked with the balloon.
| 5 | 5 | "March for Peas" | Robin J. Stein | Tim Prendergast, Dave Stone (director) | May 27, 2021 | March 25, 2022 | 106 | 0.37 |
| 5 | 5 | "The Two Angelicas" | Halima Lucas | Jackie Bae, Dave Stone (director) | May 27, 2021 | February 21, 2022 | 106 | 0.38 |
Grandpa Lou hurts his back and is unable to go to the pea parade, so the babies bring the parade to him. Angelica gets a new talking doll that looks just like her, but realizes that the doll's niceness and cuteness is making her jealous. At the playground, a bully tries to hurt the babies and Angelica stands up for them.
| 6 | 6 | "No License to Drive" | Joe Purdy | Rachel Tamura, Dave Stone (director) | October 7, 2021 | April 8, 2022 | 107 | 0.34 |
| 6 | 6 | "I Dream of Duffy" | Allan Neuwirth | Crystal Kan, Dave Stone (director) | October 7, 2021 | April 8, 2022 | 107 | 0.34 |
Because she is driving unsafe in the living room, Angelica's driving privileges are taken away so Didi and Stu and teach Angelica to become a safer driver. Stu buys Duffy, a smarthome device. Angelica realizes she can order any toy she wants by using Duffy.
| 7 | 7 | "The Fish Stick" | Sarah Allan | Tim Prendergast, Dave Stone (director) | October 7, 2021 | July 1, 2022 | 108 | 0.28 |
| 7 | 7 | "The Pickle Barrel" | Jeff D'Elia & Alec Schwimmer | Aaron Brewer, Bryan Newton & Dave Stone (directors) | October 7, 2021 | July 1, 2022 | 108 | 0.28 |
The babies listen to their favorite song, which gets stuck in Chas' head, so the babies travel inside Chas to get it unstuck. Chuckie and Tommy find out that music can actually hurt their friend.
| 8 | 8 | "The Future Maker" | Lissa Kapstrom & Jenny Jaffe | Aaron Brewer, Dave Stone (director) | October 7, 2021 | April 15, 2022 | 109 | 0.32 |
| 8 | 8 | "Goodbye Reptar" | Crescent Imani Novell | Jackie Bae, Bryan Newton & Dave Stone (directors) | October 7, 2021 | April 15, 2022 | 109 | 0.32 |
Angelica uses a face-filter app to scare Susie into thinking that she is a taco. The babies say goodbye to Repter.
| 9 | 9 | "The Bubbe and Zayde Show" | Allan Neuwirth | Tim Prendergast, Bryan Newton & Dave Stone (directors) | October 7, 2021 | June 3, 2022 | 110 | 0.20 |
| 9 | 9 | "The Perfect Myth" | Sam Clarke | Crystal Kan, Bryan Newton & Dave Stone (directors) | October 7, 2021 | June 3, 2022 | 110 | 0.20 |
Tommy realizes that his favorite show is just his grandparents talking to him on a face-call. The babies imagine their mythological legends.
| 10 | 10 | "The Big Diff" | Robin J. Stein | Jackie Bae, Bryan Newton & Dave Stone (directors) | October 7, 2021 | June 10, 2022 | 111 | 0.22 |
| 10 | 10 | "Final Eclipse" | Jeff D'Elia | Crystal Kan, Bryan Newton & Dave Stone (directors) | October 7, 2021 | June 10, 2022 | 111 | 0.22 |
| 11 | 11 | "Great Minds Think Alike" | Lauren Shell | Rachel Tamura, Bryan Newton & Dave Stone (directors) | October 7, 2021 | June 17, 2022 | 112 | N/A |
| 11 | 11 | "Betty and the Beast" | Robin J. Stein & Rachel Lipman | Aaron Brewer, Bryan Newton & Dave Stone (directors) | October 7, 2021 | June 17, 2022 | 112 | N/A |
Angelica realizes that by using her mind, she can control anything, although most of them are coincidences. Tommy's screwdriver is broken, and he is unable to let Didi fix it because of a new timer.
| 12 | 12 | "Escape from Preschool" | Lissa Kapstrom | Crystal Kan, Bryan Newton & Dave Stone (directors) | October 7, 2021 | June 24, 2022 | 113 | 0.22 |
| 12 | 12 | "Mr. Chuckie" | Jeff D'Elia | Tim Prendergast, Bryan Newton & Dave Stone (directors) | October 7, 2021 | June 24, 2022 | 113 | 0.22 |
Angelica becomes mean to Kimi and is sent into time-out in a toy house. The babies now must break her out of prison. Chuckie dreams of growing up.
| 13 | 13 | "The Werewoof Hunter" | Story by : Kate Boutilier & Eryk Casemiro; Written by : Jeff D'Elia | Tim Prendergast & Rachel Tamura, Bryan Newton & Dave Stone (directors) | October 7, 2021 | October 22, 2021 | 115 | 0.27 |
| 14 | 14 | "Traditions" | Kate Boutilier & Eryk Casemiro | Jackie Bae & Rachel Tamura, Bryan Newton & Dave Stone (directors) | December 2, 2021 | December 10, 2021 | 117 | 0.33 |
There are two things that the Pickles are celebrating at once: Christmas and Hanukkah.
| 15 | 15 | "Chuckie vs. the Vacuum" | Holly Huckins | Jackie Bae, Bryan Newton & Dave Stone (directors) | April 15, 2022 | January 27, 2023 | 114 | 0.19 |
| 15 | 15 | "Gone Teddy Gone" | Joe Purdy | Aaron Brewer, Bryan Newton & Dave Stone (directors) | April 15, 2022 | January 27, 2023 | 114 | 0.19 |
Chuckie clogs up and subsequently destroys Grandpa Lou's old vacuum cleaner, leading the baby to take on the idea that he isn't afraid of anything. Unfortunately, Stu works with Lou to fix the vacuum, and it returns to terrorize him and the other Rugrats. Tommy's beloved teddy bear, Teddy, goes missing, and Angelica is enlisted to help snub out the suspect who stole it.
| 16 | 16 | "I, Baby" | Joan Considine Johnson | Aaron Brewer, Bryan Newton & Dave Stone (directors) | April 15, 2022 | May 8, 2023 | 116 | 0.13 |
| 16 | 16 | "Fan-Gelica" | David Rosenberg | Crystal Kan, Bryan Newton & Dave Stone (directors) | April 15, 2022 | May 8, 2023 | 116 | 0.13 |
The babies think Chuckie is a robot. When Angelica accidentally goes viral for a video of her "sharing" her cookies to the babies, she must act nice and become the "Sharing Angel."
| 17 | 17 | "Captain Susie" | Story by : Lissa Kapstrom & Jeff D'Elia; Written by : Jeff D'Elia | Crystal Kan, Bryan Newton & Dave Stone (directors) | April 15, 2022 | May 9, 2023 | 118 | 0.14 |
| 17 | 17 | "Bringing Up Daisy" | Peter Gaffney | Aaron Brewer, Bryan Newton & Dave Stone (directors) | April 15, 2022 | May 9, 2023 | 118 | 0.14 |
Grandpa Lou and his friends participate in a yoga class taught by the former's girlfriend, Celeste, in which he consistently is flustered with and keeps messing up in front of. Meanwhile, Susie and co. play a game of spaceman at the playground, where Susie has to keep the crew safe from a space worm consuming members of the group one by one. Angelica receives a petunia from a kid named Bentley at her preschool as a token of appreciation, but the 3-year-old can't seem to comprehend its supposed value and throws it away. Chuckie grows attached to the flower, even giving it a nickname, "Daisy." When the kid at preschool says that he needs the flower back so Angelica can have a playdate with him, the latter continuously tries to bribe Chuckie to repossess it.
| 18 | 18 | "Wedding Smashers" | Johnny LaZebnik | Tim Prendergast, Bryan Newton & Dave Stone (directors) | April 15, 2022 | May 10, 2023 | 119 | 0.12 |
| 18 | 18 | "House Broken" | Sam Clarke | Tim Prendergast, Bryan Newton & Dave Stone (directors) | April 15, 2022 | May 11, 2023 | 119 | 0.13 |
While Stu and Drew fight over how their cake for Grandpa Lou should look, the Rugrats gang prepare a fake wedding for Angelica's dolls, Cynthia and Cyrus. An incident with Stu's newly modified Duffy device causes the Rugrats gang to be locked in the house, with no means of escape. While Stu and Grandpa Lou try to find a way to get in, the babies are forced to fend for themselves, since Duffy believes they're intruders.
| 19 | 19 | "Lucky Smudge" | Sam Clarke | Crystal Kan, Bryan Newton & Dave Stone (directors) | April 15, 2022 | May 15, 2023 | 120 | 0.14 |
| 19 | 19 | "Our Friend Twinkle" | Michael Ferris | Rachel Tamura, Bryan Newton & Dave Stone (directors) | April 15, 2022 | May 16, 2023 | 120 | 0.19 |
Angelica believes that a paint smudge on Tommy's stomach is key to winning the carnival games at her preschool. Meanwhile, Drew and Charlotte cook and serve popcorn at the carnival as "role model parents," much to their dismay. Angelica tries to spook the Rugrats by turning Phil and Lil's knowingly imaginary, non-existent friend Twinkle into a reality. Elsewhere, the parents play a Pictionary-like game with their virtual assistant, Duffy (a parody of Alexa).
| 20 | 20 | "Rescuing Cynthia" | Story by : Jenny Jaffe, Rachel Lipman & Kate Boutilier; Written by : Jenny Jaffe & Kate Boutilier | Jackie Bae & Aaron Brewer, Bryan Newton & Dave Stone (directors) | April 15, 2022 | January 20, 2023 | 121 | 0.28 |
Johnathan switches out Angelica's Cynthia doll for a Tabitha one, and after realizing that she forgot it while on her way to park, she falls asleep into a dream world where Cynthia (Tori Kelly) is missing and Tabitha (Jordin Sparks) has eclipsed her popularity.
| 21 | 21 | "Queen Bee" | Carmen Corea | Rachel Tamura, Bryan Newton & Dave Stone (directors) | April 15, 2022 | May 17, 2023 | 122 | 0.11 |
| 21 | 21 | "Phone Alone" | Gus Constantellis | Tim Prendergast, Bryan Newton & Dave Stone (directors) | April 15, 2022 | May 18, 2023 | 122 | 0.13 |
The babies imagine themselves as bees, working different tasks to earn honey from a queen bee Angelica. Meanwhile, Susie's dad tries to record a film about bees for two of his high-school students. Angelica and Bentley are on a playdate, and both desire to obtain a Cynthia collectors' patch from a call-in sweepstakes event. Things fall through when Angelica's mom, Charlotte, and all of the other parents put their phones away in a shoebox as a part of Didi's "Phone-Free Afternoon" exercise – so the two are forced to work together to obtain it, with help from the babies – although Angelica and Bentley don't see the same eye in regards with what they're going to do with the collectible. Outside, the parents play a game of crochet as a part of "Phone-Free," but Didi runs back to get her phone to preserve the memories she gained from the event.
| 22 | 22 | "Night Crawler" | Rachel Lipman | Crystal Kan, Bryan Newton & Dave Stone (directors) | April 15, 2022 | October 14, 2022 | 123 | 0.17 |
| 22 | 22 | "Goblets and Goblins" | Jeff D'Elia | Jackie Bae, Bryan Newton & Dave Stone (directors) | April 15, 2022 | October 14, 2022 | 123 | 0.17 |
| 23 | 23 | "House of Cardboard" | Monica Piper | Rachel Tamura, Dave Stone (director) | April 15, 2022 | May 22, 2023 | 124 | 0.15 |
| 23 | 23 | "Fluffy Moves In" | Holly Huckins | Jackie Bae, Dave Stone (director) | April 15, 2022 | May 23, 2023 | 124 | 0.15 |
Grandpa Lou builds Angelica a house made of cardboard, for which Chuckie takes control of its design, where the two see rare positive interactions with each other. The rest of the Rugrats think that Angelica's merely manipulating and bullying Chuckie, trying to convince him to leave and go back to playing with them. Angelica adopts a cat named "Fluffy," but soon, Fluffy is the one who can out Angelica for the things Fluffy did, and then blaming it on Angelica. Note: Outside the US, the episode is retitled "A Fluffly Surprise."
| 24 | 24 | "Susie the Artist" | Allan Neuwirth | Tim Prendergast, Dave Stone (director) | April 15, 2022 | May 24, 2023 | 125 | 0.23 |
| 24 | 24 | "A Horse is a Horse" | Peter Gaffney | Crystal Kan, Dave Stone (director) | April 15, 2022 | May 25, 2023 | 125 | 0.11 |
Charlotte declares Angelica's drawing of merely a dog to be "abstract art," and proclaims her an artist. Angelica teaches her supposed talents to Susie, who ends up being a better artist than she is, creating jealousy. The babies play with Grandpa's trained miniature horse.

=== Season 2 (2023–24) ===
| No. overall | No. in season | Title | Written by | Storyboard by | Paramount+ release date | Nicktoons air date | Prod. code | U.S. linear viewers (millions) |
|---|---|---|---|---|---|---|---|---|
Paramount+
| 25 | 1 | "Crossing the Antarctic" | Jeff D'Elia | Crystal Kan & Daniela Rodriguez de la Peña, Dave Stone (director) | April 14, 2023 | February 20, 2024 | 201 | N/A |
| 25 | 1 | "Chuckie in Charge" | Michael Ferris | Yee Hin Tang, Dave Stone (director) | April 14, 2023 | February 20, 2024 | 201 | N/A |
Angelica fakes injuring her leg because she is unable to ice-skate. The babies then cross the Antarctic with Angelica on the sled. Chuckie is in charge while Angelica is away.
| 26 | 2 | "Tooth or Share" | Lauren Shell | Mark Maxey, Dave Stone & Rachel Tamura (directors) | April 14, 2023 | February 21, 2024 | 202 | N/A |
| 26 | 2 | "Moon Story" | Sam Clarke | Daniela Rodriguez de la Peña & Rachel Tamura, Dave Stone & Rachel Tamura (directors) | April 14, 2023 | February 21, 2024 | 202 | N/A |
| 27 | 3 | "Snake in the Grass" | Joe Purdy | Jackie Bae & Daniela Rodriguez de la Peña, Dave Stone (director) | April 14, 2023 | February 22, 2024 | 203 | N/A |
| 27 | 3 | "Ancient Treasure" | Amy Hubbs | Crystal Kan, Rachel Tamura (director) | April 14, 2023 | February 22, 2024 | 203 | N/A |
| 28 | 4 | "Tot Springs Showdown" | Kate Boutilier & Eryk Casemiro | Jackie Bae & Mark Maxey, Mark Maxey & Dave Stone (directors) | April 14, 2023 | February 23, 2024 | 204 | N/A |
While celebrating Charlotte's 40th birthday at a rodeo camp, Angelica and the babies meet Charlotte's mother Judith, her new husband Julian, and Julian's son Simon. As Simon acts out, Angelica has to choose between hanging with the babies or with him. Meanwhile Didi announces that she is pregnant.
| 29 | 5 | "Little Daddy" | Jeff D'Elia | Daniela Rodriguez de la Peña, Mark Maxey & Dave Stone (directors) | April 14, 2023 | February 26, 2024 | 205 | N/A |
| 29 | 5 | "The Kid" | Story by : Lissy Klatchko & Rachel Lipman; Written by : Rachel Lipman | Daniela Rodriguez de la Peña, Rachel Tamura (director) | April 14, 2023 | February 27, 2024 | 205 | N/A |
| 30 | 6 | "Bottles Away" | Joan Considine Johnson | Mark Maxey, Mark Maxey & Dave Stone (directors) | April 14, 2023 | February 28, 2024 | 206 | N/A |
| 30 | 6 | "Extra Pickles" | Story by : Johnny LaZebnik; Written by : Rachel Lipman | Crystal Kan, Rachel Tamura (director) | April 14, 2023 | February 29, 2024 | 206 | N/A |
On a day at the beach, Tommy's bottle is sent to sea, resulting in his mother trying to get him to drink from a sippy cup. During Didi's baby shower, Angelica decides she wants all of the presents set aside for Tommy. She claims that he is being sent away, resulting in Tommy learning how to be a "Finster".
| 31 | 7 | "Gramping" | Rachel Lipman | Zac Palladino & Daniela Rodriguez de la Peña, Rachel Tamura (director) | April 14, 2023 | March 1, 2024 | 207 | N/A |
With a week left of Didi's pregnancy, Lou's sick of the noise at his home causing him to go camping with his friend Bob to write a song in peace. As Stu is freaking out about having another kid, he starts talking of moving out of his dad's home into Drew's guest room. This results in Stu, Drew, Graham, Lucy, Charlotte, and Randy taking the kids to follow after the man, leaving Didi and Chas back at home. Angelica talks the babies into following her father through the woods for marshmallows claiming to be hunting Bigfoot. At the same time, Didi goes into labor, resulting in trying to contact Stu. As he has no cell reception, Lou's friend Graham Prescott goes looking for the group.
| 32 | 8 | "The Blob from Outer Space" | Allan Neuwirth | Daniela Rodriguez de la Peña, Mark Maxey (director) | April 14, 2023 | March 4, 2024 | 208 | N/A |
| 32 | 8 | "The Chop" | Natalie Walmsley | Mark Maxey, Mark Maxey & Dave Stone (directors) | April 14, 2023 | March 4, 2024 | 208 | N/A |
| 33 | 9 | "Tommy the Giant" | Blake Pickens | Jackie Bae, Rachel Tamura (director) | April 14, 2023 | March 5, 2024 | 209 | N/A |
| 33 | 9 | "Nanny Pip" | Rachel Lipman | Crystal Kan, Rachel Tamura (director) | April 14, 2023 | March 6, 2024 | 209 | N/A |
| 34 | 10 | "Sir Spike" | Alonso Cisneros | Zachary Palladino, Mark Maxey (director) | April 14, 2023 | March 7, 2024 | 210 | N/A |
| 34 | 10 | "Rattled" | Michael Ferris | Jackie Bae, Rachel Tamura (director) | April 14, 2023 | March 8, 2024 | 210 | N/A |
| 35 | 11 | "Reptar Day!" | Michael Ferris | Jackie Bae, Mark Maxey & Dave Stone (directors) | April 14, 2023 | March 11, 2024 | 211 | N/A |
| 35 | 11 | "Mission to the Little" | Sarah Allan | Jackie Bae & Zachary Palladino, Rachel Tamura (director) | April 14, 2023 | March 11, 2024 | 211 | N/A |
After hearing the TV mention 'Reptar day' the babies begin to believe that Earth day is 'Reptar day'. Angelica however disbelieves them. On a night where Betty brought her girlfriend Trish to watch an outdoor movie at the Pickles home, Phil realizes that he actually likes Trish when the babies head into the house to get Dil.
| 36 | 12 | "Miss Match" | Joan Considine Johnson | Crystal Kan, Mark Maxey (director) | April 14, 2023 | March 12, 2024 | 212 | N/A |
| 36 | 12 | "Flamingo Dance" | Sam Clarke | Crystal Kan, Dave Stone & Rachel Tamura (directors) | April 14, 2023 | March 12, 2024 | 212 | N/A |
During Kira Watanabe's last piano lesson, Angelica and Susie team up to set Kira up with Chas so they wouldn't be stuck watching Dil. Even without the babies' help, Chas and Kira decide to go on a date. Susie and Chuckie have a recital where they dance in flamingo costumes. After their teacher removes their boas, Susie begins to boycott the recital. In the audience, the parents try out all the seats to find the best ones. In the end, Susie decides to join her class on the stage.
| 37 | 13 | "Baby Talk" | Crescent Imani Novell, Rachel Lipman & Kate Boutilier | Daniela Rodriguez de la Peña, Mark Maxey (director) | April 14, 2023 | March 13, 2024 | 213 | N/A |
| 37 | 13 | "Tossed and Found" | David Ramirez | Jackie Bae, Rachel Tamura (director) | April 14, 2023 | March 13, 2024 | 213 | N/A |
Susie is excited for her cousin Edwin to come visit. However after trying to talk to him, she learns that neither Edwin nor his older brother Buster could understand her. Angelica said that once they hit a certain age they too would no longer be able to understand baby talk. Susie is determined however to get Edwin to play with them. After hearing Didi mention naptime, the babies believe that Lou and his friends needed to return home for their nap. In the effort to tire them out, the babies proceed to throw away their things for the adults to find. During this they come across Daxton as he blogged about Boris and Minka's blintzes food truck.
Nicktoons
| 38 | 14 | "Mini-Mommy" | David Ramirez | Diem Doan, Rachel Tamura (director) | N/A | March 14, 2024 | 214 | TBD |
| 38 | 14 | "No Talking" | Teddy Lavon | Lisa Wu, Mark Maxey (director) | N/A | March 14, 2024 | 214 | TBD |
| 39 | 15 | "The Climb" | Story by : Rachel Lipman; Written by : Teddy Lavon | Lisa Wu, Rachel Tamura (director) | N/A | March 15, 2024 | 215 | 0.03 |
| 39 | 15 | "Wolf at the Door" | Lorin Williams | Daniela Rodriguez de la Peña, Mark Maxey (director) | N/A | March 15, 2024 | 215 | 0.03 |
| 40 | 16 | "Chuckie Little" | Lorin Williams | Roan Everly, Rachel Tamura (director) | N/A | March 15, 2024 | 216 | TBD |
| 40 | 16 | "What's Your Wish?" | Kate Boutilier | Chelsea Holt, Mark Maxey (director) | N/A | March 15, 2024 | 216 | TBD |
| 41 | 17 | "A Scare to Remember" | Michael Ferris | Daniela Rodriguez de la Peña, Rachel Tamura (director) | N/A | March 18, 2024 | 217 | 0.03 |
| 41 | 17 | "The Long Playdate" | Peter Gaffney | Chelsea Holt, Mark Maxey (director) | N/A | March 18, 2024 | 217 | 0.03 |
| 42 | 18 | "Guitar Man" | Joe Purdy & Kate Boutilier | Amie Sanchez, Rachel Tamura (director) | N/A | March 19, 2024 | 218 | TBD |
| 42 | 18 | "Uncle Jake's Day Out" | Allan Neuwirth | Diem Doan, Mark Maxey (director) | N/A | March 19, 2024 | 218 | TBD |
| 43 | 19 | "Surviving Dil" | Conor Biddle & Matthew Fichandler | Chelsea Holt, Mark Maxey (director) | N/A | March 20, 2024 | 219 | 0.04 |
| 43 | 19 | "Reptar's Mama" | Michael Molina | Amie Sanchez, Rachel Tamura (director) | N/A | March 20, 2024 | 219 | 0.04 |
| 44 | 20 | "The Heist" | Michael Ferris | Diem Doan, Mark Maxey (director) | N/A | March 21, 2024 | 220 | TBD |
| 44 | 20 | "The Lambster" | Teddy Lavon | Lisa Wu, Rachel Tamura (director) | N/A | March 21, 2024 | 220 | TBD |
| 45 | 21 | "Purim" | Rachel Lipman | Daniela Rodriguez de la Peña & Lisa Wu, Rachel Tamura (director) | N/A | March 22, 2024 | 221 | 0.05 |
Digital/DVD
| 46 | 22 | "The Tommy" | Story by : Megan Gonzalez & Peter Gaffney; Written by : Peter Gaffney | Daniela Rodriguez de la Peña, Mark Maxey (director) | April 12, 2024 | TBA | 222 | N/A |
| 46 | 22 | "Breaking Begley" | Kobie Scott | Chelsea Holt, Rachel Tamura (director) | April 12, 2024 | TBA | 222 | N/A |
| 47 | 23 | "Big Night" | Joan Considine Johnson | Amie Sanchez, Mark Maxey (director) | October 8, 2024 | TBA | 223 | N/A |
| 47 | 23 | "No, No, Nana" | Alexandra Shields | Diem Doan, Rachel Tamura (director) | October 8, 2024 | TBA | 223 | N/A |
| 48 | 24 | "The Sleepover" | Michael Molina | Lisa Wu, Mark Maxey (director) | October 8, 2024 | TBA | 224 | N/A |
| 48 | 24 | "The Favor" | Michael Ferris | Diem Doan, Rachel Tamura (director) | October 8, 2024 | TBA | 224 | N/A |
| 49 | 25 | "Chuckie Come Home Part 1" | Kate Boutilier & Rachel Lipman | Chelsea Holt & Amie Sanchez, Mark Maxey (director) | October 8, 2024 | TBA | 225 | N/A |
| 50 | 26 | "Chuckie Come Home Part 2" | Kate Boutilier & Rachel Lipman | Diem Doan & Lisa Wu, Rachel Tamura (director) | October 8, 2024 | TBA | 226 | N/A |

=== Season 3 (2026) ===
| No. overall | No. in season | Title | Written by | Storyboard by | Original release date | Prod. code |
|---|---|---|---|---|---|---|
| 51 | 1 | "A Tiger's Tale" | Michael Ferris | Daniela Rodriguez de la Peña, Mark Maxey (director) | June 1, 2026 | 301 |
| 51 | 1 | "Grandchild of the Month" | Conor Biddle & Matthew Fichandler | Chelsea Holt, Rachel Tamura (director) | June 1, 2026 | 301 |
| 52 | 2 | "Bookworm" | Alexandra Shields | Amie Sanchez, Mark Maxey (director) | June 2, 2026 | 302 |
| 52 | 2 | "The Cookie Test" | Johnny LaZebnik | Diem Doan, Rachel Tamura (director) | June 2, 2026 | 302 |
| 53 | 3 | "Mudville" | Joan Considine Johnson | Daniela Rodriguez de la Peña, Rachel Tamura (director) | June 3, 2026 | 303 |
| 53 | 3 | "Stepping Stone" | Rachel Lipman | Daniela Rodriguez de la Peña, Rachel Tamura (director) | June 3, 2026 | 303 |
| 54 | 4 | "Scooped" | Alison Taylor | Chelsea Holt, Mark Maxey (director) | June 4, 2026 | 304 |
| 54 | 4 | "Class Pet" | Peter Gaffney | Amie Sanchez, Rachel Tamura (director) | June 4, 2026 | 304 |
| 55 | 5 | "Desert Trip" | Michael Ferris, Rachel Lipman & Kate Boutilier | Diem Doan & Lisa Wu, Mark Maxey (director) | June 5, 2026 | 305 |
| 56 | 6 | "Wild Doll" | Monique Brandon | Lisa Wu, Mark Maxey (director) | June 6, 2026 | 306 |
| 56 | 6 | "The Pest Plant" | Laura Kleinbaum | Chelsea Holt, Mark Maxey (director) | June 6, 2026 | 306 |
| 57 | 7 | "Forest Friends" | Teddy Lavon | Amie Sanchez, Rachel Tamura (director) | June 7, 2026 | 307 |
| 57 | 7 | "Castle Guy" | Peter Gaffney | Diem Doan, Mark Maxey (director) | June 7, 2026 | 307 |
| 58 | 8 | "Tricycle Kid" | Rachel Lipman | Lisa Wu, Rachel Tamura (director) | June 8, 2026 | 308 |
| 58 | 8 | "Simply Simon" | Kate Boutilier | Daniela Rodriguez de la Peña, Mark Maxey (director) | June 8, 2026 | 308 |
| 59 | 9 | "New Year on Ice" | Jeff D'Elia, Rachel Lipman & Kate Boutilier | Chelsea Holt & Amie Sanchez, Rachel Tamura (director) | June 9, 2026 | 309 |
| 60 | 10 | "Flower Girl" | Kate Boutilier | Lisa Wu, Mark Maxey (director) | June 10, 2026 | 310 |
| 60 | 10 | "Flight of the Finster" | Kobie Scott | Diem Doan, Rachel Tamura (director) | June 10, 2026 | 310 |
Angelica tries to become a flower girl when she finds out Kimi will be the flower girl at Chas and Kimi's wedding Kimi feels worried because Chuckie is going on a "pilot training" test at the Senior Center Carnival
| 61 | 11 | "The Toy Box" | Michael Ferris | Daniela Rodriguez de la Peña, Mark Maxey (director) | June 11, 2026 | 311 |
| 61 | 11 | "The Pit" | Tariq Fisher | Chelsea Holt, Rachel Tamura (director) | June 11, 2026 | 311 |
The babies imagine if they were toys, living in Toyland The babies try to make forest brownies, but Phil falls into a pit, and Lil is curious on why the babies aren't interested in helping Phil.
| 62 | 12 | "Dinner Guest" | Joan Considine Johnson | Amie Sanchez, Mark Maxey (director) | June 12, 2026 | 312 |
| 62 | 12 | "Bucket List" | Peter Gaffney & Holly Huckins | Diem Doan, Rachel Tamura (director) | June 12, 2026 | 312 |
Susie uses her dad's school model skeleton, Bonesy as a guest at her pretend restaurant When Ms. Marjorie stops by the Mehtas' house to discuss a design opportunity, Nyla thinks that Darsh will attend preschool forever.
| 63 | 13 | "Big Cake Day Part 1" | Kate Boutilier & Rachel Lipman | Chelsea Holt, Daniela Rodriguez de la Peña & Lisa Wu, Mark Maxey (director) | June 13, 2026 | 313 |
| 64 | 14 | "Big Cake Day Part 2" | Kate Boutilier & Rachel Lipman | Diem Doan, Chelsea Holt, Amie Sanchez, Lisa Wu & Daniela Rodriguez de la Peña, Rachel Tamura (director) | June 14, 2026 | 314 |

=== Shorts (2021–22) ===
| No. | Title | Original release date | Nickelodeon air date | Prod. code |
|---|---|---|---|---|
| 1 | "Tommy's Ball" | May 27, 2021 (Note: This short was first uploaded to the Paramount+ YouTube channel on May 13, 2021.) | May 14, 2021 | 104 |
Angelica throws Tommy's ball over the fence and he wants to get it back.: Note: This is a remake of a scene from the original series' first season episode "Barbeque Story".
| 2 | "Night Howl" | May 27, 2021 (Note: This short was first uploaded to the Paramount+ YouTube channel on May 14, 2021.) | May 14, 2021 | 101 |
Tommy goes out on a night adventure with his dog Spike.
| 3 | "The Lamp" | May 27, 2021 | May 27, 2021 | 103 |
Angelica intentionally breaks Tommy's clown lamp after scaring off Chuckie.: Note: This is a remake of the ending of the original series' first season episode "The Trial".
| 4 | "The Slide" | May 27, 2021 | May 28, 2021 | 102 |
Chuckie looks to overcome his fear of slides.: Note: This is a remake of the ending of the original series' second season episode of the same name.
| 5 | "Expedition" | October 7, 2021 | October 1, 2021 | 105 |
| 6 | "Cynthia Show" | October 7, 2021 | October 1, 2021 | 106 |
Angelica makes a video about her doll, Cynthia, but the babies keep getting in the way of filming.
| 7 | "Art Project" | October 22, 2021 (Note: This short was first uploaded to the Nickelodeon Instagram account on October 17, 2021.) | October 8, 2021 | 107 |
The babies create a fabulous work of art.
| 8 | "Reptar in Space" | October 22, 2021 | Never aired | 108 |

== Home media ==
=== DVD ===
| Region | Set title | Season(s) | Aspect ratio | Episode count | Time length | Release date |
|---|---|---|---|---|---|---|
| 1 | Season 1, Volume 1 | 1 | 16:9 | 13 | 313 minutes | July 12, 2022 |
| 1 | Season 1, Volume 2 | 1 | 16:9 | 12 | 272 minutes | March 7, 2023 |
| 1 | Season 2 | 2 | 16:9 | 26 | 591 minutes | October 8, 2024 |
