= Toot & Puddle (TV series) =

- Genre: Animation; Comedy; Educational; Adventure; Preschool
- Based on: Toot & Puddle by Holly Hobbie
- Developed by: Stu Krieger
- Directed by: Christian Larocque
- Voices of: Jo Vannicola; Samantha Reynolds; Taylor Barber; Linda Ballantyne; Bryn McAuley; John McGrath; Andrew Sabiston; Denis Akiyama
- Theme music composer: Steve D'Angelo; Terry Tompkins
- Opening theme: "Toot & Puddle"
- Ending theme: "Toot & Puddle (instrumental)
- Composers: Steve D'Angelo; Terry Tompkins
- Countries of origin: Canada; United States
- Original language: English
- No. of seasons: 1
- No. of episodes: 26 (52 segments)

Production
- Executive producers: Clint Eland; Tara Sorensen
- Running time: 22 minutes
- Production companies: Mercury Filmworks; National Geographic Kids Entertainment

Original release
- Network: Noggin; Nick Jr. Treehouse TV
- Release: September 2, 2008 – July 31, 2011

Toot & Puddle is a traditionally animated children's television series, based on the book series by Holly Hobbie, who also co-created the series with her husband Douglas. The series features the voices of Jo Vannicola as Toot and Samantha Reynolds as Puddle. It was produced by Mercury Filmworks in association with National Geographic Kids, Treehouse TV and Nick Jr..

The series premiered in Canada on Treehouse TV on September 2, 2008 and last aired there on July 31, 2011. In the United States, the series first aired on Noggin on November 16, 2008 before moving to Nick Jr. on September 28, 2009 and aired there until the series finale on May 15, 2011. Twenty-six episodes were produced.

== Plot ==
The series focuses on the lives of two adventurous pigs, Toot and Puddle. The two live in Woodcock Pocket with many friends. In each episode, the duo learns about a different place or culture.

During the course of each episode, either Toot visits a new location and communicates to Puddle by sending a postcard, or the two travel together. In each episode, The Boomerang Song (an exclusively-written song) is used as a transition between both stories.

== Characters ==
- Toot (voiced by Jo Vannicola) is a young pig who loves to explore. He almost always travels somewhere away from his home with his digital camera to capture photographs of his adventures. He's Puddle's best friend.
- Puddle (voiced by Samantha Reynolds) is a pig and Toot's best friend. He likes to explore, but finds the area where he lives more interesting than places far away.
- Opal (voiced by Taylor Barber) is a cheerful and happy-go-lucky pig and Puddle's little cousin who is inquisitive (i.e. asks many questions).
- Tulip (voiced by Linda Ballantyne) is a parrot who lives in Woodcock Pocket.
- Otto (voiced by John McGrath) is a tortoise who lives in the forest in a tortoise like house.
- Desmond (voiced by Andrew Sabiston) is a kangaroo from Australia.
- Lilly (voiced by Bryn McAuley) is a frog who lives in Pocket Pond.
- Dr. Ha Song (voiced by Denis Akiyama) is a Chinese pig who lives in the clinic.
- Gabe is a friend of Toot & Puddle.

== Production ==
Licensing rights to the Toot & Puddle books were acquired by Silver Lining Entertainment Limited by 2001. The following year, they announced plans for Millimages to develop a half-hour special based on the I'll Be Home for Christmas book and a 26-episode half-hour series; the series was put on hold a few months later in favor of a special based on the Top of the World book; no further updates were made regarding Silver Lining and Millimages' progress and, by the time Silver Lining Entertainment Limited was acquired by Chorion in 2005, the Toot & Puddle rights had been sold to Chorion.

=== Episodes ===
All episodes were directed by Christian Larocque.

1. The Great Cheese Chase/Swing Shift (2 September 2008 in Canada; 17 November 2008 in the US) – Toot & Puddle fly to France to get cheese. / Puddle makes a swing using a tire, but the tire goes missing!
2. Free-Falling Friends/Curried Favors - Toot & Puddle are given skydiving lessons. / Toot flies to India and learns how to cool off.
3. Opal's Big Move/Get With the Beat - Toot takes Opal to meet a famous ballerina he met in Russia. / Toot flies to the Democratic Republic of the Congo to learn about tribal culture.
4. You Reap What You Sow/Lost and Found - Puddle teaches Opal how to plant a garden. / Toot & Puddle fly to Belize to discover an ancient temple.
5. Doors, Drawers, and Floors/Abominable Toot - Puddle teaches Toot how to share with others. / Toot & Puddle go to Tibet in the Himalayas to see if the Abominable Snowman is real.
6. The Dragon Kite/Tulips for Tulip - Puddle and Opal go kite flying, but their kite flies away. / Toot & Puddle fly to the Netherlands to find tulips for their friend Tulip.
7. The Scarecrow/Which Way's Which? - Opal and Puddle can't decide what to wear to Otto's costume party. / Toot flies to Denmark and helps a goose find her glasses.
8. Toot & Puddle's Campout/Toot's Alpine Adventure - Toot & Puddle go camping. / Toot flies to Germany to discover a castle and meets a lost calf.
9. Party Pride/The Race - Toot & Puddle throw a house party for their friends while it's raining. / Toot & Puddle fly to the Balearic Islands, Spain and enter in a soapbox race.
10. Puddle's Poison Ivy/The Amazing Maze - Puddle gets poison ivy which postpones Toot's trip to Egypt. / Toot & Puddle fly to Ireland to explore its many hedge mazes.
11. Year of the Pig/Robinson Toot - Dr. Ha Song misses spending Chinese New Year back home in China so Toot, Puddle and the rest of the gang bring it to him. / Toot flies to Palau and goes on an island to get warm after a cold day in Woodcock Pocket.
12. Night Lights/Away From Home - Puddle tries to figure out what to give Lilly at her party (The start of “Night Lights” is Puddle blowing once a birthday blowout before both Toot and Puddle laugh). / Toot & Puddle fly to Japan, but Puddle later gets homesick.
13. Desmond Bounds In/Putting the Art in Artichoke - A kangaroo from Australia named Desmond moves to the neighborhood. (This is the first episode to feature Desmond, who previously still appeared in the opening sequence.) / Toot & Puddle fly to Castroville, California, USA to learn about its traditional and culinary arts.
14. Bye-Bye, Butterfly/Flying Down to Rio - Opal finds a butterfly and learns about migration while Toot flies to Mexico. / Toot & Puddle fly to Brazil to think of an idea for the Carnaval.
15. Otto's Blackout/Puddle's Delicious Waffles - Otto conquers his fear of the dark when a storm hits. / Toot & Puddle fly to Belgium to learn how to make waffles.
16. Recycle Cycle/Being Green - Toot, Puddle, and Opal learn how to take care of their environment. / Toot & Puddle fly to Scotland to help Toot's uncle Bertie reuse his old junk into something else.
17. Desmond's First Snow/Haleakala Sunrise - The gang teaches Desmond what winter is like in Pocket Hollow. / Toot & Puddle fly to Hawaii to learn how to dance the Hula at sunrise.
18. Leap Frog/A Painted Pot - Lilly trains herself to jump high in the long jump. / Toot & Puddle fly to Italy to learn how to play Football and paint pots.
19. It's Mine/Tumble Pandas - Lilly finds a wild berry bush and reluctantly shares it. / Toot flies to China and meets a group of acrobatic Pandas.
20. Toot & Puddle's Clubhouse/Toot's Arctic Adventure - Toot & Puddle start their own secret club / Toot flies to Nunavut, Canada to learn about the eskimo tribe.
21. The Show Must Go On/Astronaut Camp - The gang puts on a play. / Toot & Puddle fly to Cape Canaveral, Florida, USA to join the astronaut camp.
22. Old and New/The Drawing Diary - Toot & Puddle wonder if they should get rid of their globe that covers every place that they have visited. / Toot goes to the Galapagos Islands, Ecuador.
23. The Legend of Pocket Hollow/It's A Mystery - Toot & Puddle get spooked by a story of a monster in Pocket Hollow. / Toot & Puddle fly to England to solve any mystery that comes to mind.
24. Opal's Loose Tooth/Take a Break - Opal worries about her loose tooth. / Toot & Puddle fly to Niger and learn about digging for fossils.
25. Puddle's Lucky Clover/Friends in the City - Puddle loses his good luck charm. / Toot & Puddle fly to New York City, USA.
26. Look Again/Round Round Get Around (15 May 2011 in the US) - Toot, Puddle and their friends go on a treasure hunt. / Toot & Puddle go to Vancouver, British Columbia, Canada to give their friend a birthday present. (This is the series finale.)

=== Pilot ===
Toot & Puddle: I'll Be Home For Christmas
- Directed by: Ginger Gibbons
- Screenplay by: Stu Krieger
- Produced by: Ginger Gibbons; Stacey Attanasio-Gonsalves; András Erkel
- Starring: Katie Leigh; Adam Wylie; Jessica DiCicco
- Edited by: Corinne Lejeune
- Music by: Colin Towns
- Production companies: Grand Slamm Children's Films; National Geographic Kids; Studio Baestarts
- Distributed by: Nickelodeon
- Release date: December 5, 2006
- Running time: 46 minutes
- Countries: United States; United Kingdom
- Language: English

The pilot, a Christmas special film titled I’ll Be Home for Christmas, was released on December 5, 2006.

==== Cast ====
- Katie Leigh – Toot
- Adam Wylie – Puddle
- Jessica DiCicco – Opal
- Walker Edmiston
- Julian Holloway
- Edie McClurg
- Annie Mumolo
- Natalia Nogulich
- James Sie
- Joe Whyte
