= Paper Source =

American stationery and gift retailer

Paper Source, Inc.
- Type: Private
- Industry: Retail
- Founded: Chicago, Illinois (1983)
- Headquarters: 125 S Clark Street, Chicago, Illinois 60603 & 7801 Industrial Drive, Forest Park, Illinois 60130, U.S.
- Number of locations: 129
- Key people: Jenica Myszkowski (CEO)
- Owner: Barnes & Noble
- Website: www.papersource.com

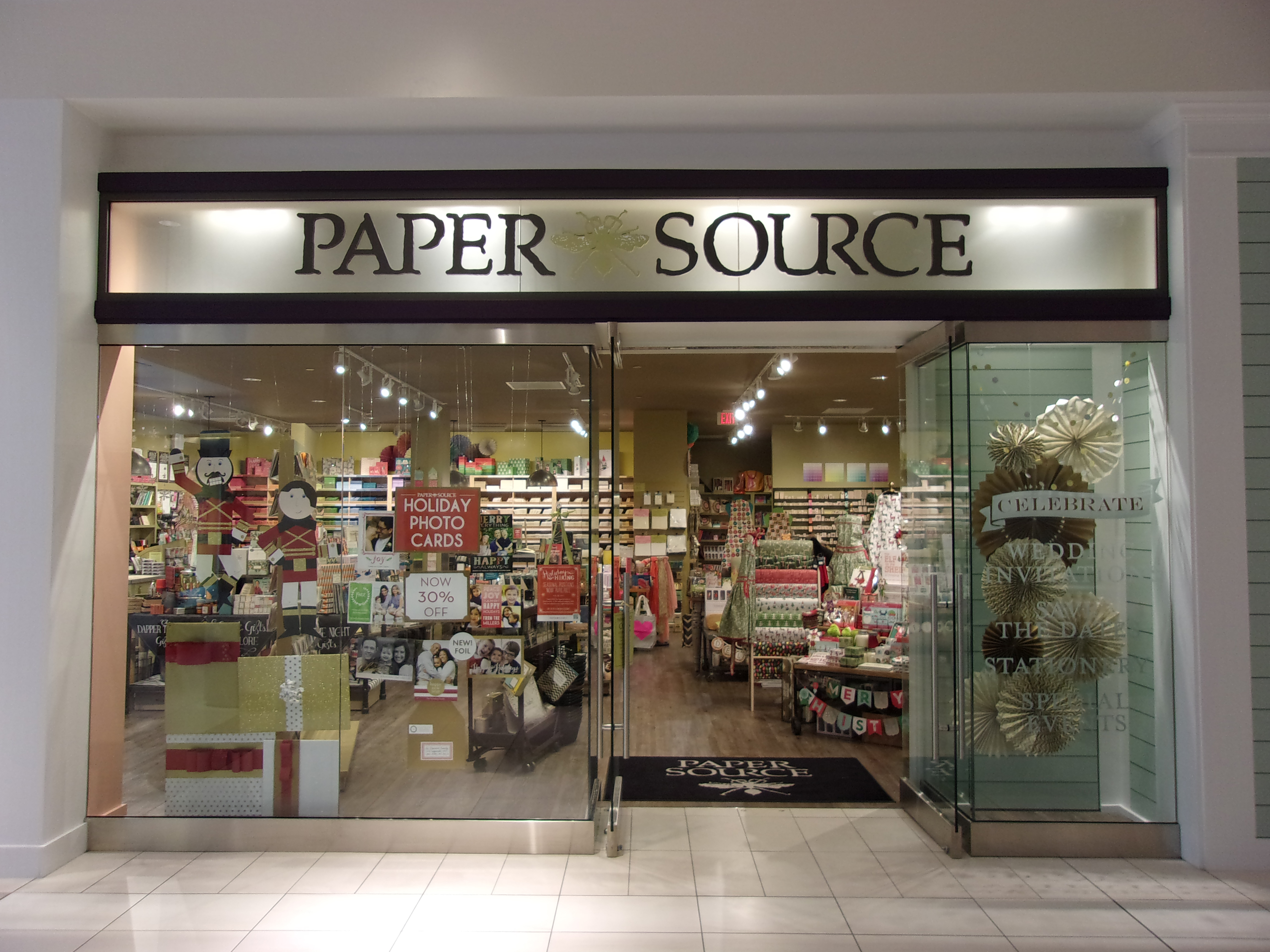
A Paper Source store in Indianapolis, Indiana, in 2015.

Paper Source is an American stationery and gift retailer based in Chicago, Illinois, that offers papers, custom invitations and announcements, gifts, greeting cards, gift wrap, paper craft kits, party supplies, and personalized stationery and stamps.

Paper Source was founded by Susan Lindstrom in 1983 after a trip to Japan exposed her to refined stationery. The first Paper Source store opened in Chicago's River North neighborhood to showcase handcrafted papers from around the world. Lindstrom retired as Chief Creative Officer in 2009.

== 2007 Sale to Brentwood Associates ==
In 2007, Brentwood Associates purchased a majority stake in the company and Sally Pofcher was named CEO. Under Pofcher's leadership, the retailer grew from 20 stores to 100.

== 2013 Sale to Investcorp ==
In 2013, Paper Source was sold to Investcorp. In 2015, after opening their 100th store, Paper Source hired a new CEO, Winnie Park, and opened a large warehouse facility in Forest Park, IL.

In March 2020, Paper Source acquired 30 stores from bankrupt stationery retailer Papyrus. With this acquisition, Paper Source grew to over 165 stores.

In March 2021, Paper Source filed for Chapter 11 bankruptcy.

== 2021 Sale to Barnes & Noble ==
On May 11, 2021, news sites started reporting that Paper Source had emerged from bankruptcy and sold to Barnes & Noble. The sale would save about 130 stores and 1,700 employees. Barnes & Noble CEO James Daunt will oversee both companies. While the two businesses plan to operate independently, it hinted at possible partnerships in the future.

On June 25, 2021, James Daunt appointed Jenica Myszkowski CEO. She had previously served as the company's Chief Operating Officer.

== Notable employees ==
Meghan, Duchess of Sussex, worked as a calligraphy instructor at the Beverly Hills branch of Paper Source from 2004 to 2005.
