= Carlton Cards =

Canadian greeting card company

- Type: Subsidiary
- Industry: Greeting cards
- Founded: 1920; 106 years ago
- Headquarters: Mississauga, Ontario, Canada
- Services: Greeting cards
- Parent: American Greetings
- Website: Official website

Carlton Cards Limited (French: Cartes Carlton Limitée) is a greeting card company in Canada. Its lines of cards include Carlton, Gibson and Tender Thoughts. It also distributes the American Greetings line of cards in Canada. Since 2009, "Carlton Card Retail" has been owned by Schurman Retail Group, its wholesale division remaining with American Greetings; the stores closed in 2020. The closure does not impact the 6000 Canadian retail locations that sell Carlton Cards products.

Carlton Cards was founded by Hubert Harry Harshman in Toronto, Ontario, in 1920. By 1933, it became incorporated. In 1956, Carlton Cards was purchased by American Greetings. Little is known about Harshman, but he did file a patent for card display with United States Patent and Trademark Office in 1928.

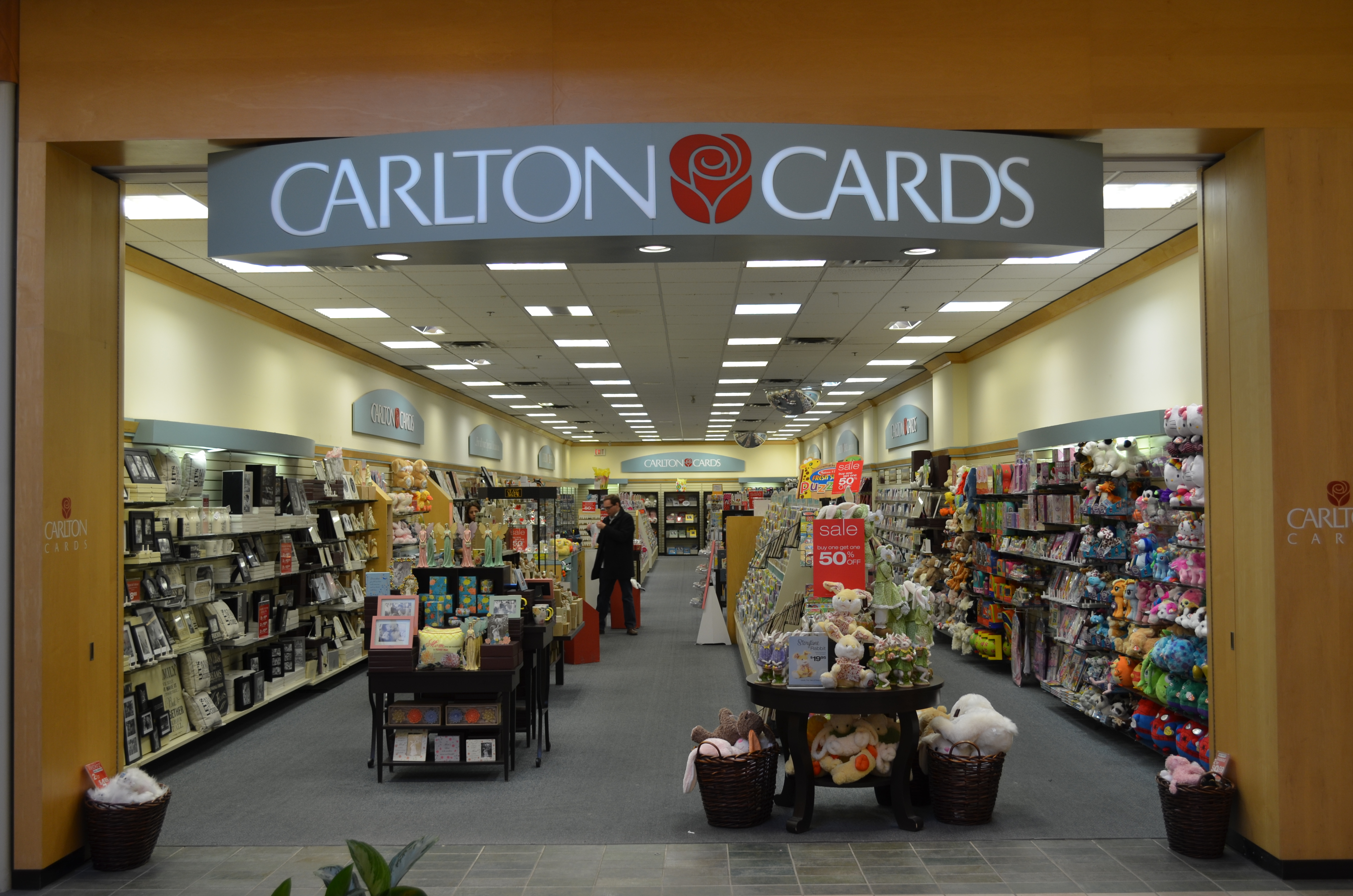
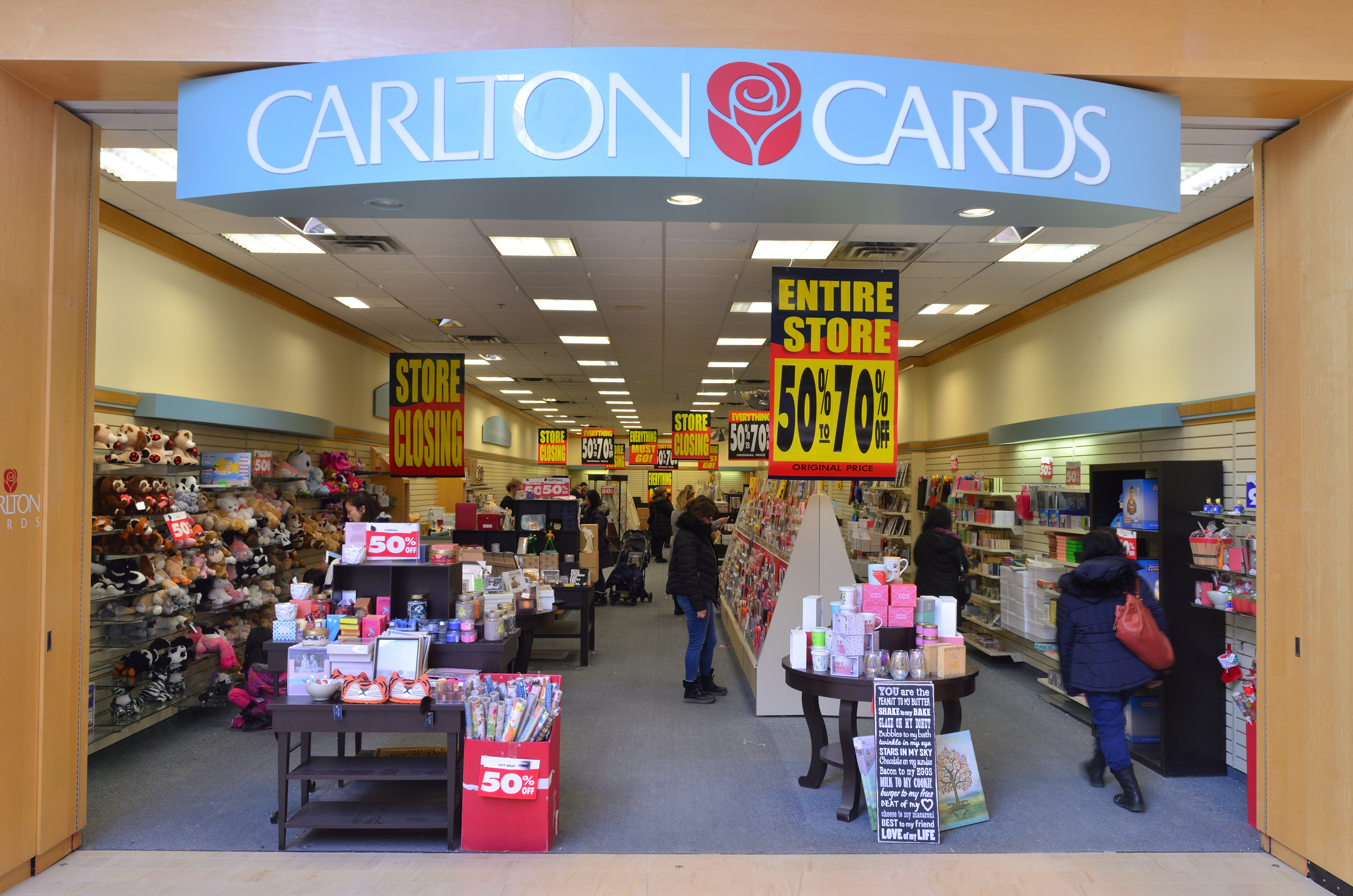
Carlton Cards at Hillcrest Mall in 2014 (left) and the same store during a store closing sale in 2020 (right).
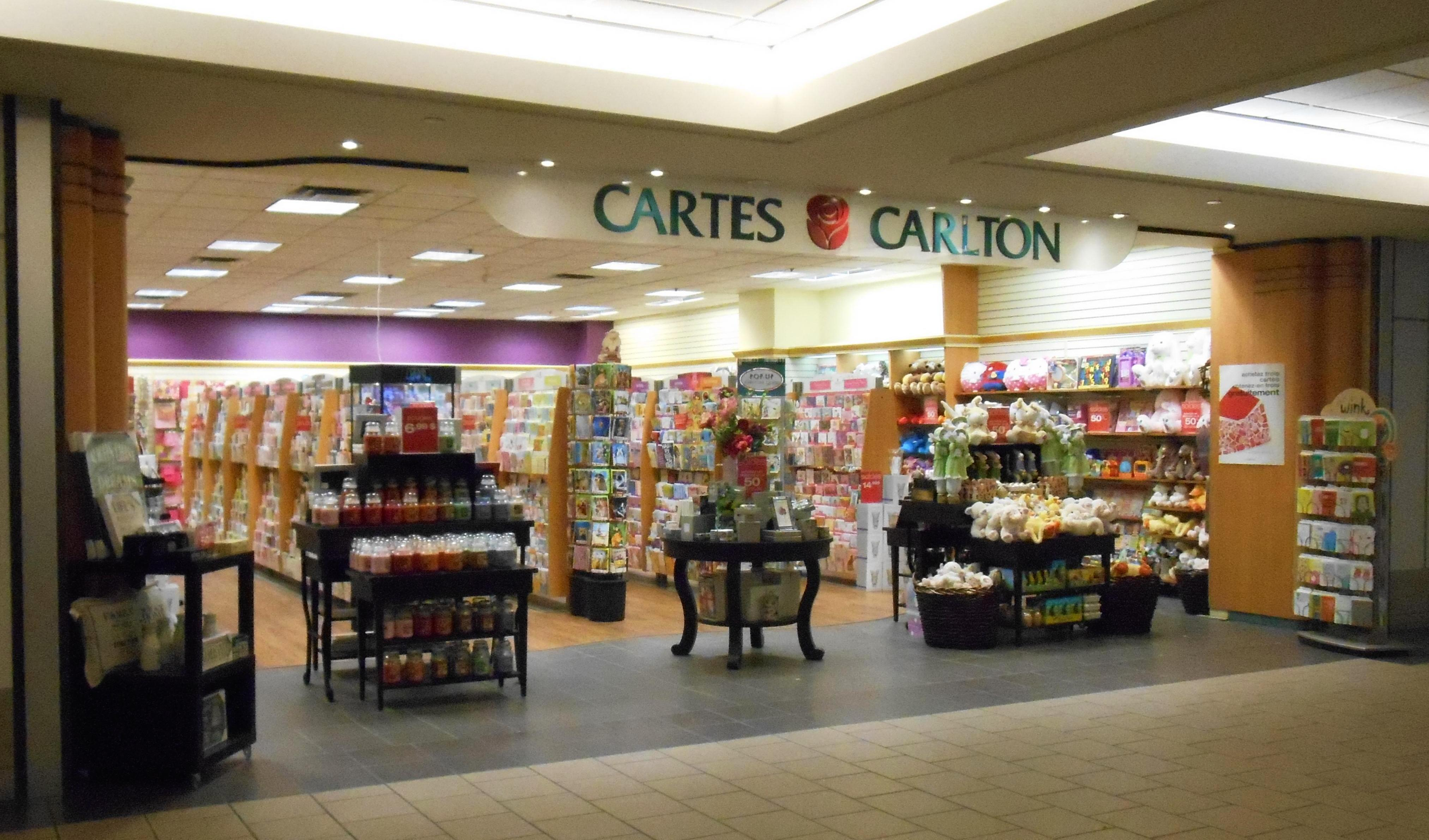
In Montreal Central Station
