= Holly Hobbie =

American writer and illustrator

- Born: Holly Ulinskas; 1944 (age 81–82); Watertown, Connecticut, U.S.
- Occupations: Writer; watercolorist; illustrator
- Spouse: Douglas Hobbie (m. 1964)

Denise Holly Hobbie (née Ulinskas; born 1944) is an American writer, watercolorist and illustrator. She is best known for creating the American Greetings character which, originally unnamed, is now also called Holly Hobbie. She also created the Toot & Puddle series of children's books.

== Personal life ==
She is from Connecticut and married Douglas Hobbie in 1964. She resides in South Deerfield, Massachusetts.

Born Holly Ulinskas from Watertown, Connecticut.

== Career ==
=== Author ===
Hobbie is the author of the popular Toot & Puddle children's books and the creator of the character bearing her name.

=== Namesake character ===
In the late 1960s, at the encouragement of her brother-in-law, Hobbie sold distinctive artwork of a cat-loving, rag dress-wearing little girl in a giant bonnet to American Greetings in Cleveland, Ohio. The artwork, based on Hobbie's own children and with rustic New England–style of a bygone era, became popular, and her originally nameless character (identified earlier as "blue girl") became known as Holly Hobbie.

== Works ==
=== Toot & Puddle series ===
Toot & Puddle are best friends, even though Toot likes to travel and Puddle likes to stay at home in Woodcock Pocket.

==== Books ====
- Toot & Puddle
- A Present for Toot
- You Are My Sunshine
- Puddle's ABC
- I'll Be Home For Christmas
- Top of the World
- Charming Opal
- The New Friend
- Wish You Were Here
- The One and Only
- Let It Snow
- How Does Your Garden Grow?

==== Television show ====
The adaptation of the books, Toot & Puddle was made in 2008 by Mercury Filmworks, National Geographic Kids, and Treehouse TV.

==== Film ====
In December 2006, Toot & Puddle: I'll Be Home for Christmas, serving as the pilot episode to Toot & Puddle, aired on Treehouse in Canada and on Noggin in the US. It was released on DVD by National Geographic.

=== Other books ===
- Elmore (2018)
- A Cat Named Swan (2017)
- Hansel and Gretel (2015)
- The night before Christmas (Text by Clement Clarke Moore) (2013)
- Gem (2012)
- Fanny (2008)
- Holly Hobbie's Happy Day Book (1978)
- Fanny & Annabelle (2009)
- Everything But The Horse: A Childhood Memory (2010)
- The Art of Holly Hobbie (1986)
- Holly Hobbie's the night before Christmas (1976)
