= American Greetings =

American greeting card company

American Greetings Corporation
- Logo used since 2017
- Formerly: Sapirstein Greeting Card Company (1906-1938)
- Type: Private
- Industry: Greeting card
- Founded: 1906; 120 years ago
- Founder: Jacob Sapirstein
- Headquarters: 1 American Boulevard, Westlake, Ohio, United States
- Area served: Worldwide
- Key people: John Compton (chairman); Joe Arcuri (president and CEO); Erwin Weiss (SVP); Gregory M. Steinberg (CFO)
- Products: Greeting cards; Gift wrap; Party goods; Giftware; Stationery; Electronic greetings; Calendars; Educational products
- Brands: Carlton Cards; Tender Thoughts; Just For You; Gibson; Papyrus; Strawberry Shortcake (formerly); Care Bears (formerly)
- Revenue: $1.67 billion (2012)
- Net income: $57.2 million (2012)
- Owner: Clayton, Dubilier & Rice (60%); Century Intermediate Holding Co. (Weiss Family, 40%)
- Number of employees: 27,500 (2012)
- Subsidiaries: UK Greetings
- Website: www.americangreetings.com

American Greetings Corporation is a privately held American company and is the world's second largest greeting card producer behind Hallmark Cards. Based in Westlake, Ohio, a suburb of Cleveland, the company sells paper greeting cards, electronic greeting cards, gift packaging, stickers and party products. In addition, the company owns the Carlton Cards, Tender Thoughts, Papyrus, Recycled Paper Greetings and Gibson Greetings brands.

American Greetings' former toy design and licensing division, initially called Those Characters From Cleveland, subsequently renamed AG Properties and American Greetings Entertainment and now separately owned as Cloudco Entertainment. American Greetings also holds an exclusive license for Nickelodeon characters.

== History ==
=== Sapirstein Greeting Card ===
Sapirstein Greeting Card Co. was founded in 1906 by Polish immigrant Jacob Sapirstein (1885–1987), who sold cards to stores from a horse-drawn cart, American Greetings has been run by members of the family since its inception. Irving Sapirstein, Jacob's oldest son, became Jacob's first partner in 1918 at age nine. Irving's brother Morris started working at the card company in 1926. Morris and Irving in 1928 got a post card contract worth $24,000. The company started using self-serve display cabinets for its greeting cards in 1929 further cementing its position in the market. Sapirstein Greeting began in 1932 making its own greeting cards.

In 1934, the company began hiring sales representatives. Harry, the youngest son, joined the business in 1935. In 1936, the company opened its first branch office and the first major manufacturing facility.

=== American Greetings ===
Sapirstein Greeting Card Co. was renamed in 1938 to American Greetings Publishers. In 1939, the firm first issued the Forget-Me-Not card line. Irving and his brothers changed their last name to Stone in the 1940s. American Greeting Publishers was incorporated in 1944. John Sands Pty. Ltd. of Sydney, Australia and the company signed a licensing agreement, the firm's first, in 1949.

The company changed its name to American Greetings Corporation as the company went public in 1952, issuing 200,000 shares. The funds raised were earmarked for acquisitions and expansion. In 1956, American Greetings formed Carlton Cards, Ltd., a Canadian subsidiary. Also that year, the Hi Brows humor studio card line was launched.

In July 1957, the company moved its headquarters to One American Road, Brooklyn, Ohio. In 1958, American Greetings went public. Jacob Sapirstein became chairman of the board while Irving assumed the company's president post in 1960. In Forest City, North Carolina, the company built a cabinet manufacturing plant in 1960. A Mexican subsidiary in Mexico City was set up in 1969. In 1971, a retail subsidiary was formed called Summit Corporation, later called Carlton Cards Retail, Inc.

Holly Hobbie premiered in 1967 as a line of greeting cards by American Greetings. The character's public appeal lead to the formation of Those Characters From Cleveland Inc. Sale the next year topped $100 million. In 1972, the company introduced Ziggy, created by Tom Wilson, which soon had a newspaper cartoon strip generating additional income. By 1977, Holly Hobbie became one of the top female licensed characters in the world.

Morry Weiss, Irving's son-in-law, and Irving Stone in 1978 were appointed president and chairman & CEO, respectively. Also that year, the corporation set up two new subsidiaries Plus Mark, Inc. and A.G. Industries, Inc. Plus Mark was formed to manufacture Christmas gift wrap, boxed cards, and accessories. A.G. Industries was a display fixture manufacturer. American Greeting had seen itself as a mass-marketer and was serving pharmacies, variety stores, discount stores, and supermarkets with low cost cards. Meanwhile, Hallmark Cards ignored the mass market outlets until 1959 with issuance of its Ambassador card line. The company then used its licensing revenue on national advertising and other efforts to gain market share from 1981 to 1985. While they had a net income increase of 613 percent over ten years, Hallmark still maintained its market share. Gibson Greetings started a price war in 1986 and ended in 1987 which had the three major greeting card companies taking a loss. With a drop in licensing revenue, American took until 1989 to recover.

Those Characters From Cleveland was started up by Tom Wilson on behalf of American Greetings in 1980. The first property out of Those Characters was Strawberry Shortcake, which generated in 1981 $500 million in retail sales, followed by the Care Bears with $2 billion in sales over its first two years.

AG came back with a doubled net income by 1991 with 10 percent growth in sales to Hallmark's 1 percent. Weiss was promoted to CEO while Ed Fruchtenbaum was elevated as the fourth and first non-family president. Weiss had streamlined operations, cut costs, and decreased its card idea development time frame to market. Fruchtenbaum stressed information systems technology with the development of software to aid the sales force, to managers and their retailers in order to track inventories and trends. The following year, Weiss and Fruchtenbaum were promoted again to chairman/CEO and president/chief operating officer, respectively, with Irving Stone becoming founder-chairman.

Custom Expressions, Inc., the CreataCard producer, was acquired in 1992, The CreataCard units had 1,000 card options and printed cards in under four minutes for $3.50 each. The company placed a few thousand units in mass-merchandise outlets in the US. By early 1994, 7,000 were installed. The kiosks generated modest profits off healthy revenue. With the Touch Screen Greetings and the Personalize It! method, Hallmark in 1992 sued AG over patent infringement with a 1995 settlement that allow both to use the technology worldwide. By 1995, the kiosks were being left behind by personal computers and the internet. The units were partially written off. American had also made deals with online services, Prodigy, CompuServe, and Microsoft Network in early 1996. Their website was redesigned to allow the cards to be designed on the website then mailed from its Cleveland fulfillment center in 1997. Two CD-ROM products, Personal CardShop for Home and Office and CreataCard Plus, were published. Both allowed for personalization. CardShop had 150 card choices and used the modem to order them to be printed and mailed by their fulfillment center. CreataCard had 3,000 predesigned greeting cards, invitations, stationery, and announcements, and three methods of fulfillment: print on home printer, by e-mail or via the company's center.

In the mid-1990s, American Greetings expanded its operations with acquisitions or starting up of new lines of business, and starting in 1996, the promotion of sideline product categories to semi-autonomous units. A reading glasses manufacturer, Magnivision, was purchased in 1993. In 1996, the party goods line was relaunched under the DesignWare name. The same year, American Greetings entered discussions with BEC Group Inc. to acquire Foster Grant Group, a sunglasses manufacturer, but declined to pursue the purchase. A candle line was relaunched in 1997 under the name GuildHouse. A supplemental educational products subsidiary, Learning Horizons, Inc., was set up in March 1997, but in August American Greetings sold two subsidiaries, Acme Frame Products, Inc. and Wilhold Inc., producer of hair accessory products, to Newell Company. Contempo Colours, a party goods company in Michigan with licenses including Monopoly and Sesame Street, was bought in August 1999 to add to DesignWare.

In Canada, the Forget-Me-Not brand was launched in 1993. In July 1997, American Greetings launched its "The All New American Way" marketing strategy that consisted of massive revamping of its everyday card lines over the next year and a half to meet nine American cultural trends.

In the 1990s, American Greetings pushed more into international markets. Acquisition occurred in 1995 with a purchase of 80% share of S.A. Greetings Corporation in South Africa and in 1996 with the purchase of John Sands, the top greeting card company in both Australia and New Zealand. In 1998, Camden Graphics Group and Hanson White Ltd. were purchased to add to its UK operations, while in 1999, a majority stake in Memory Lane Sdn Bhd, a Malaysian greeting card company, brought American to Asia for the first time.

American Greetings made a bid for Gibson Greetings, the third top card maker in the US, in March 1996, which was rejected. In 1999, the company agreed to buy rival Gibson Greetings and united the second and third largest U.S. greeting card makers. Through the Gibson purchase, American gained its strong UK unit and a 27% stake in Egreetings Network Inc.

In 1998, the company shares moved from trading on the NASDAQ to the New York Stock Exchange. AmericanGreetings.com, Inc., while not turning a profit, was announced in June 1999 to be taken public, but was withdrew due to the early 2000 tech stock collapse.

In March 1999, Hallmark started a price war with the introduction of a 99-cent card line forcing American to do the same. In 1999, the implementation of a new inventory system slowed shipments to retailers, but this reduced sales by $100 million, a 1.5% decrease, ending a 93rd consecutive year of increasing revenue.

Fruchtenbaum was terminated in June 2000 for insider trading policy violation after the board learned that he purchased stock via options, then sold them in December 1998 before the announcement of the new inventory system implementation's expected loss. Board member James C. Spira was then appointed vice-chairman.

In November 2000, Spira was appointed to oversee a massive overhaul. The company cut 1,500 jobs, closed six manufacturing and distribution centers, discontinued Forget-Me-Not, one of its four main U.S. card brands, and cut the offered greeting cards to 10,000 from 15,000. The firm also shifted to recognizing sales at the retailer's register, not when it was stocked on the retailer's shelves in order to better control inventory. This cost them $300 million, and was highly unprofitable in the 2001 and 2002 fiscal years.

In its online sector in 2001, American Greeting purchased the Egreetings Network shares that Gibson did not already own. In January 2002, the company purchased Blue Mountain Arts (BlueMountain.com) from Excite@Home with Excite to buy ads on American Greeting websites and Blue Mountain would continue providing ecards for Excite. The company thus had four online greeting cards website including BeatGreets.com, a musical greetings website. While the online operations expected to become profitable by the fourth quarter 2002, the division had a lower loss than in the prior year.

In 2003, Morry Weiss's sons, Zev and Jeffrey, became CEO and president respectively; Morry Weiss remained chairman. American Greetings had also branched out onto the internet and owned a network of websites. In October 2007, American Greetings bought Webshots from CNET for $45 million in cash.

In July 2004, American Greetings sold MagniVision to an affiliate of Foster Grant sunglasses manufacturer. In October 2005, American Greetings recalled its Sesame Street toy sunglasses sold from December 2003 through August 2005, because the lenses can separate from the frames, posing a choking hazard to young children.

American Greetings purchased Recycled Paper Greetings in February 2009. Two months later, in two cash deals with Schurman Fine Papers on April 17, the company sold its remaining 341 stores to them, and in the second deal bought Schurman's wholesale division, Papyrus brand cards and paper products, and a 15% equity stake in Schurman.

In April 2010, the company closed its DesignWare plant in Kalamazoo as the company moved to Amscan for manufacturing their party goods. American Greetings received $25 million and a warrant for 2 percent of common stock in AAH Holdings, Amscan's parent corporation, while Amscan received inventory, equipment and processes. In Mexico, the company moved strategically to a third party distributor model and closed its warehouse there.

In 2010, American Greetings planned to move its headquarters from Brooklyn, Ohio, to a new facility at Crocker Park within the nearby city of Westlake, but in 2013, the company delayed to move its operations to Westlake. Construction had been scheduled to start in early 2013. In 2014, American Greetings sold its Brooklyn, Ohio headquarters to developers and began renting its current offices from the new owners until the move to Westlake. American Greetings opened their new Westlake headquarters in September 2016. The company leases the building from the Wiess family until August 2031.

American Greetings forced Clinton Cards PLC in May 2012 into administration. In June, American Greetings acquired assets from Clinton Cards together with some of its subsidiaries including UK Greetings. UK Greetings' card brands at the time were Camden Graphics, Hanson White, Forget Me Not and Xpressions. Clinton operated stores under the Clinton and Birthdays brands. American Greetings brought in Dominique Schurman, CEO of Schurman Retail Group, to lead Clinton.

=== Private corporation ===
American Greetings went private once again in mid-2013, thus removing itself from all the public markets, agreeing to pay $18.20 per share, valuing the company at $878 million. The Weiss family-owned Century Intermediate Holding Co. purchased the public shares.

In 2018, the Weiss family sold a 60% majority stake of the company to the investment firm Clayton, Dubilier & Rice (CD&R). The Weiss Family would continue to operate as directors and shareholders of American Greetings as well as retain ownership of American Greetings Entertainment, which was spun off as Cloudco Entertainment. UK Greetings continued with American Greetings under CD&R while the Clintons retail chain in the UK remained with the Weiss family. On closing of the deal, David Scheible was named chairman in place of Morry Weiss and President John Beeder was promoted to CEO (the former chairman and co-CEOs remaining on the board). In January 2019, the Weiss family placed AG's headquarters up for sale.

Scheible had been replaced by John Compton as chairman. On March 1, 2019, the retiring CEO Beeder was replaced by Joe Arcuri. In January 2020, partially owned Schurman Retail Group filed for Chapter 11 bankruptcy, resulting in the closing of all of its stores, including American Greetings locations.

== Gibson Greetings ==
Acquired in 1999, Gibson was founded by brothers George, Robert, Samuel and Stephen in 1855 as Gibson & Company, Lithographers in Cincinnati. It eventually began making greeting cards in 1860s and 1870s, sold to brother George as Gibson Arts in 1883 and Gibson Greeting Cards Inc. in 1960. One of Gibson's most notable greeting card writers was Helen Steiner Rice. After being under RCA Corporation and other owners it was sold to American Greetings.

== Units ==
American Greetings operates with four divisions:

- North American Social Expression Products
- International Social Expression Products
- AG Interactive (Webshots was formerly part of AG Interactive)
- a non-reportable operating segment, sometimes referred to as "Retail"

== Subsidiaries and holdings ==
=== Current ===
- Recycled Paper Greetings
- John Sands, Australian subsidiary
- Schurman Retail Group (15%) runs American Greetings retail stores
- UK Greetings, British subsidiary

=== Former ===
- Those Characters From Cleveland (1980–2018; now Cloudco Entertainment)
- AmToy (1979–1988; sold to Tyco in June 1988)
- PhotoWorks, shut down and sold to Shutterfly in 2011.

== Cartoonists ==
- R. Crumb
- Peter Guren (Ask Shagg)
- Holly Hobbie
- Tom Wilson

== See also ==
- Cardmaking
