= The Care Bears Movie =

1985 film by Arna Selznick

- Theatrical release poster
- Directed by: Arna Selznick
- Screenplay by: Peter Sauder
- Produced by: Michael Hirsh; Patrick Loubert; Clive A. Smith
- Starring: Mickey Rooney; Jackie Burroughs; Cree Summer; Sunny Besen Thrasher; Hadley Kay; Georgia Engel; Billie Mae Richards
- Edited by: Jim Erickson; Tom Joerin; Gordon Kidd; Stephen Mitchell; Sheila Murray; Steve Weslak; Michael O'Farrell
- Music by: Patricia Cullen
- Production companies: Nelvana Limited; American Greetings; Those Characters from Cleveland, LLC
- Distributed by: The Samuel Goldwyn Company; (United States); Astral Films; Criterion Pictures Corporation; (Canada)
- Release dates: March 24, 1985 (New York City); March 29, 1985 (North America)
- Running time: 76 minutes
- Countries: Canada; United States
- Language: English
- Budget: $2 million (Note: Sources differ as to the actual cost of The Care Bears Movie.: US$2 million: Foley (2003), Stewart (2005); US$3 million: Salamon (1985), Daniell (1985), Stoffman (2002); US$3.5 million: Adilman (1987), Lerch (1988); US$4 million: Harmetz (1985), Walmsley (1985), Engelhardt (1986), Solomon (1986), Beck (2005); US$4.5 million: Thomas (1986))
- Box office: $34 million

The Care Bears Movie is a 1985 animated musical fantasy film directed by Arna Selznick from a screenplay by Peter Sauder. It was the second feature film made by the Canada-based studio Nelvana Limited after the 1983 film Rock & Rule, in addition to being one of the first films based directly on a toy line and the first based on Care Bears. It introduced the Care Bears characters and their companions, the Care Bear Cousins. (Note: Introduced by American Greetings in 1984, the Care Bear Cousins are a group of animals who serve as relatives to the Care Bears. The group consists of different species, such as monkeys, elephants and penguins.) The voice cast includes Mickey Rooney, Georgia Engel, Jackie Burroughs and Billie Mae Richards. In the film, an orphanage owner (Mickey Rooney) tells a story about the Care Bears, who live in a cloud-filled land called Care-a-Lot. While traveling across Earth, the Bears help two lonely children named Kim (Cree Summer) and Jason (Sunny Besen Thrasher), who lost their parents in a car crash, and also save Nicholas (Hadley Kay), a young magician's apprentice, from an evil spirit's influence. Deep within a place called the Forest of Feelings, Kim, Jason and their friends soon meet another group of creatures known as the Care Bear Cousins.

American Greetings, the owners of the Care Bears characters, began development of a feature film adaptation in 1981. Later on, the greeting card company chose Nelvana to produce it and granted them the film rights to the characters, in addition to financing the film along with cereal manufacturer General Mills and television syndicator LBS Communications. Nelvana's founders were producers, with fellow employee Arna Selznick directing the film. Production lasted eight months, with a production budget of at least $2 million, and took place in Canada, Taiwan, and South Korea. Carole King and John Sebastian contributed several songs for the film. Though major American film studios passed on the project, newly established independent distributor The Samuel Goldwyn Company acquired the distribution rights to the film and soon spent a record $24 million promoting it.

The Care Bears Movie premiered on March 24, 1985, in New York, and was released in North America on March 29, 1985; (Note: In the US and Canadian domestic market, wide release occurs when a film is playing in 600 or more theatres.) another Nelvana film, Strawberry Shortcake Meets the Berrykins, was released alongside it. It received mixed reviews from critics, who raised concern over its potential as a full-length advertisement for the title characters, among other aspects. It went on to earn $23 million domestically, making it the highest-grossing Canadian film during 1985 (with C$1.845 million), in addition to winning a Golden Reel Award. With over $34 million in worldwide sales, it set a box-office record for Canadian and non-Disney animation and has remained one of Goldwyn's largest-earning releases. The film's success, which saved Nelvana from closing, helped revive films aimed at children in the US market. It has since been cited as inspiring a spate of toy-based animated and live-action features; the film was later followed by two sequels, A New Generation (1986) and Adventure in Wonderland (1987), neither surpassing the original financially or critically.

== Plot ==
The Cherrywoods are a middle-aged couple who run an orphanage. Mr. Cherrywood tells the orphans a story about the Care Bears and Care-a-Lot, their home in the clouds. In the story, Friend Bear and Secret Bear search for people to cheer up. They meet Kim and Jason, two lonely youngsters who recently lost their parents in a car crash. Introducing themselves, Friend Bear and Secret Bear remind the kids of their ambitions, but neither sibling seems interested.

At an amusement park, Tenderheart Bear spots a magician's apprentice named Nicholas. While unloading a trunk of goods for his master, the "Great Fetuccini", Nicholas finds an old book with a diary-style lock. When he unlocks it, an evil spirit appears as a woman's face and corrupts him. With his help, it lays waste to the park and quests to remove all caring from the world.

Back at Care-a-Lot, the other bears work on their new invention: the Rainbow Rescue Beam, a portal that can send any bear to Earth and back. Two Care Bear cubs, Hugs and Tugs, interfere with the Rainbow Rescue Beam. They bring forth unexpected visitors: Friend Bear, Secret Bear, Kim, and Jason. The bears introduce themselves to the children, and give them a tour of their home. Tenderheart Bear returns on his now-out-of-control Rainbow Roller, just before a "Cloud-Quake", caused by the spirit, ruins Care-a-Lot. Tenderheart informs the others of Nicholas' troubles on Earth. Using the Rainbow Rescue Beam, he sends Kim and Jason to the park along with Friend Bear and Secret Bear. They end up in the Forest of Feelings when the portal malfunctions. From a nearby river, the other bears search for them aboard the Cloud Clipper. Good Luck Bear, Grumpy Bear, Grams Bear, and the cubs stay behind in Care-a-Lot.

Within the Forest, the children and their friends meet Brave Heart Lion and Playful Heart Monkey. Later on, more of these creatures are discovered: Cozy Heart Penguin, Lotsa Heart Elephant, Swift Heart Rabbit, and Bright Heart Raccoon. During their stay, the spirit attacks them in several disguises: a pike, a tree, and an eagle. After the Care Bears and their new friends defeat it, they venture back to Earth with more—Loyal Heart Dog, Proud Heart Cat, Gentle Heart Lamb, and Treat Heart Pig—to save Nicholas from the spirit's influence.

At the park, Nicholas obtains the ingredients for his spell against the children and the creatures. After he casts it, the Care Bears and company engage in a long battle. The bears shoot beams of bright light on him, forming their "Stare"; the Cousins help with their "Call". Good Luck Bear and Grumpy Bear arrive in time to help after fixing the Rainbow Rescue Beam. As the creatures' power drains away, Nicholas and the spirit briefly regain control. Kim and Jason assist Nicholas, who finally realizes his misdeeds; with Secret Bear's help, he re-traps the spirit in the book, saving himself, the park, and the world. He thanks the group and reunites with Fetuccini. Tenderheart Bear inducts the Care Bear Cousins into the Care Bear Family and gives them their own tummy symbols. Kim and Jason find new parents, who take them to one of Nicholas' shows.

As Mr. Cherrywood finishes his story, it is revealed that he is actually Nicholas. Tenderheart Bear, who has been listening from outside a window, returns to Care-a-Lot in his Cloudmobile.

== Voice cast ==
Name	Character(s)	Source
Mickey Rooney	Nicholas Cherrywood (adult)	
Jackie Burroughs	The Evil Spirit	
Georgia Engel	Love-a-Lot Bear	
Sunny Besen Thrasher	Jason	
Eva Almos	Friend Bear/Swift Heart Rabbit	
Patricia Black	Share Bear/Funshine Bear	
Melleny Brown	Cheer Bear/Baby Tugs Bear	
Bobby Dermer	Grumpy Bear	
Jayne Eastwood	Birthday Bear	
Anni Evans	Secret Bear/Champ Bear	
Gloria Figura	Bedtime Bear	
Cree Summer Francks	Kim	
Brian George	Mr. Fetuccini	
Janet-Laine Green	Wish Bear	
Luba Goy	Lotsa Heart Elephant/Gentle Heart Lamb	
Terri Hawkes	Baby Hugs Bear	
Dan Hennessey	Brave Heart Lion (speaking voice/singing voice; movie version)	
Jim Henshaw	Bright Heart Raccoon	
Hadley Kay	Nicholas Cherrywood (teenager)	
Marla Lukofsky	Good Luck Bear/Playful Heart Monkey	
Pauline Rennie	Grams Bear/Cozy Heart Penguin	
Billie Mae Richards	Tenderheart Bear	
Jayne Eastwood	Mrs. Cherrywood	
Brent Titcomb	Additional voices	
Harry Dean Stanton	Brave Heart Lion (singing voice; soundtrack version)	

== Production ==
=== Development ===
The Care Bears were created in 1981 by Those Characters from Cleveland (TCFC), a division of the Cleveland greeting card company American Greetings Corporation (AGC). That same year, the title characters made their debut on greeting cards by Elena Kucharik, while American Greetings began to develop a feature-length film using the characters. Kucharik, along with Linda Denham, Linda Edwards, Muriel Fahrion, Dave Polter, Tom Schneider, Ralph Shaffer, and Clark Wiley, created the original characters. Early in their tenure, the Bears appeared as toys from the Kenner company, and starred in two syndicated television specials from another Canadian animation studio, Atkinson Film-Arts of Ottawa: The Care Bears in the Land Without Feelings (1983) and The Care Bears Battle the Freeze Machine (1984).

Production of the first feature took place at another Canadian outlet, Toronto's Nelvana studio. This came in a period in the company's history which Nelvana co-founder Michael Hirsh refers to as its "dark years". (Note: According to Michael Hirsh, this period lasted from 1983 to 1986.) At the time, Nelvana had just finished production of its first full-length film, 1983's Rock & Rule, which was produced using almost all of its resources (for around US$8 million), and failed to find proper distribution. The film put them on the verge of closing down. Soon after, the Nelvana team began doing work on television shows like Inspector Gadget (from DIC Entertainment), 20 Minute Workout (from Orion Television), and Mr. Microchip. During this period, they also made syndicated specials based on American Greetings properties: Strawberry Shortcake, The Get Along Gang, and Herself the Elf. "In some instances," noted Harvey Levin, vice-president of marketing and entertainment communications at TCFC, "their capabilities [on the Strawberry Shortcake specials] surpassed Disney quality." Various companies vied to produce a Care Bears feature, and Nelvana was the first to do so; Hirsh sought to seize the opportunity after hearing of its development. DIC Entertainment also expressed interest. Thanks to the Strawberry Shortcake specials and their experience on Rock & Rule, Nelvana acquired the film rights to the characters and gained a contract from American Greetings to create the script. To convince the production partnership of TCFC and Kenner Toys, Hirsh held a competition inspired by Pepsi-Cola's "Pepsi Challenge" commercials of the time, in which he tested clips from Nelvana and other vying studios and checked the "animation quality, music, sound effects, and colour" of each. He then asked the producers to decide on the best demo, and Nelvana scored highest. Hirsh later recalled the words of his partners: "We know you've rigged this against everybody else because you've chosen the clips. But we like the approach."

=== Producers and crew ===
The Care Bears Movie was one of the first films to be based directly on an established toy line. It featured the ten original Bears, along with six additions to the line-up, and marked the media debut of the Care Bear Cousins. Produced for at least US$2 million, the film was financed by American Greetings, the owners of the Care Bears franchise; General Mills, the toys' distributor; and television syndicator LBS Communications. The Kenner company also took part in the production. Brought in under budget, The Care Bears Movie became Nelvana's second feature-length production, and was made over an eight-month period that lasted until February 1985. Michael Hirsh is quoted as saying in Daniel Stoffman's 2002 book, The Nelvana Story: "Nobody had ever made an animated movie for theatrical release for as little money and in as little time." In 2009 his partner, Clive A. Smith, told Canadian Business magazine: "I swear I grimaced at the thought of doing a Care Bears feature. But Michael [Hirsh] went out and actually brought that project in." Nelvana was responsible for the script, several special effects, including those for the "Care Bear Stare", and hired musicians and voice actors. With this project, Arna Selznick became the third of only four women ever to direct an animated feature; (Note: Before Selznick's Care Bears Movie, Lotte Reiniger of Germany directed 1927's The Adventures of Prince Achmed, and Great Britain's Joy Batchelor directed Halas and Batchelor's 1954 adaptation of Animal Farm. The fourth one, Brenda Chapman, was responsible for 1998's The Prince of Egypt, from DreamWorks Animation.) prior to this, she worked on several Nelvana productions, including Strawberry Shortcake and the Baby Without a Name. Nelvana's founders—Michael Hirsh, Patrick Loubert, and Clive A. Smith—participated as the main producers. The studio's roster included Charles Bonifacio, the director of animation, and supervising animator Darlie Brewster, who previously took part in the animation courses at Ontario's Sheridan College. Dale Schott, who served as a storyboard artist, remarked that "Nelvana had a lot to do with reviving the low-budget feature" with its efforts on The Care Bears Movie.

Four employees of the film's financiers served as executive producers: Louis Gioia Jr., president of Kenner's Marketing Services division; (Note: Credited as Lou Gioia.) Jack Chojnacki, co-president of TCFC; Carole MacGillvray, who became president of General Mills' M.A.D. (Marketing and Design) division in February 1984; and Robert Unkel, LBS' senior vice-president of programming. A fifth producer, American Greetings staffer W. Ray Peterson, went uncredited. Three associate producers worked on the film: Paul Pressler, another employee at Kenner; John Bohach, who later became LBS' executive vice-president; and Harvey Levin. Lenora Hume, the director of photography on Rock & Rule, was the supervising producer.

=== Animation ===
Along with Inspector Gadget, The Care Bears Movie was Nelvana's first foray into animation outsourcing. Production took place at Nelvana's facilities in Toronto, Cuckoo's Nest Studios in Taiwan and the newly established Hanho Heung-Up and Mihahn studios in South Korea. Delaney and Friends, a Vancouver-based outlet, did the uncredited work. Nelvana faced several problems with their Korean contractors, among them the language barrier between the Canadian crew and the overseas staff, and the unwieldy processes through which the film reels were shipped to the West. At one point, Loubert, Smith, and fellow staffer David Altman spent three days trying to persuade several unpaid animators to return important layout sketches. In exchange for the layouts, Nelvana gave them US$20,000 in South Korean won. By then, the production was falling behind schedule, and an opening date was already set; Loubert sent half of the work to Taiwan (where Lenora Hume supervised), while the remainder stayed in South Korea under Loubert's and Smith's watch.

Back in Canada, Hirsh tried to promote the unfinished feature before its deadline; unable to get available footage, he instead managed to show potential marketers some Leica reels and a few moments of completed colour animation. According to him, it was the first time an animated "work in progress" was screened to exhibitors; this ploy has since been used by Disney, particularly in the case of Beauty and the Beast (at the 1991 New York Film Festival). "People loved the movie anyway," he said of this experiment. "I was told it was considered great salesmanship. It made [them] feel that they were part of the process because they were seeing unfinished work."

=== Music ===
The Care Bears Movie: Original Soundtrack Album

Soundtrack album by Carole King, John Sebastian, NRBQ, and the Tower of Power
- Genre: Children's music / Soundtrack
- Labels: United States: Kid Stuff Records; DAR 3901 (LP) / DT 4901 (Cassette)
- Producers: Lou Adler; John Sebastian; Walt Woodward

The music for The Care Bears Movie was composed by Patricia Cullen. The soundtrack album was released in LP and cassette format by Kid Stuff Records in the United States, Six songs were performed by Carole King, John Sebastian, NRBQ, and the Tower of Power, actor Harry Dean Stanton had a guest appearance as Brave Heart Lion for the song "Home is in Your Heart". The songs were produced by Lou Adler and John Sebastian, with additional lyrics and music by Ken Stephenson, Walt Woodward, and David Bird, Nelvana crewmember Peter Hudecki prepared the song sequences.

Before The Care Bears Movie, Sebastian contributed to several other Nelvana specials, including The Devil and Daniel Mouse (1978) and Easter Fever (1980). When asked to compose three tracks for the film, he learned about the characters since he was unfamiliar with the franchise. Despite his misgivings on the marketing aspects, Sebastian said in April 1985, "I think their central theme—being candid about your feelings, sharing your feelings—is a very positive message for children."

Adele Freedman of Toronto's The Globe and Mail wrote positively about the music in the film:

A lot of caring has gone into the soundtrack. It doesn't attack the eardrum in the manner of so much current kids' stuff. It supposes that a child's ear can discriminate between good music and aural pollution as well as anybody else's. Carole King (of Tapestry fame) wrote and performed the theme song, "Care A Lot". The remaining songs, written by John Sebastian, are likewise entertaining and imaginatively arranged. The music does a lot to make the kingdom of Care-a-lot, where the goody-goody bears hang out on clouds monitoring life below on their Caring Meter, a slightly less irritable place.

Other critics tended to differ. The Houston Chronicle's Stephen Hunter found that "the film integrates its music into the story very clumsily. It's not merely that the numbers are forgettable—they are—it's that they're shoe-horned so obviously into the story that they don't amplify it, they stop it cold." Likewise, Michael Blowen of The Boston Globe said that "the uninspired songs ... add nothing to the banal plot."

No.	Title	Writer(s)	Performer(s)	Length
1.	"Care-a-Lot"	Carole King	Carole King
2.	"Nobody Cares Like a Bear"	John Sebastian	John Sebastian
3.	"Home is in Your Heart"	Carole King	Carole King, Harry Dean Stanton, Louise Goffin, Robbie Kondor & Levi Larky
4.	"When You Care, You're Not Afraid to Try"	John Sebastian	John Sebastian & Cast
5.	"Look Out, He's After You"	Walt Woodward, David Bird & Ken Stephenson	Walt Woodward, David Bird, Becky Goldstein, Susan Kross, Anne Marie Prunty, Christine Selbert, NRBQ & Tower of Power
6.	"In a Care Bear Family"	John Sebastian	John Sebastian

== Release ==
Swift Heart Rabbit staring at the Spirit's spell possessing a tree. An element from this scene was featured in an advertising campaign aimed at the film's potential older viewers, despite its target audience being young children.

In 1984, before the film's completion, Carole MacGillvray offered The Care Bears Movie for consideration to major studios in the US; since they did not see the financial potential in a picture aimed strictly at children, they declined the offer. MacGillvray told Adweek magazine in April 1985, "I made several trips, and I was really disappointed. They kept telling me things like 'Animated movies won't sell' and 'Maybe we'd consider it if you were Disney,' but most just said, 'You're very nice, good-bye.' " When few takers were left, she took it to the Samuel Goldwyn Company. A newcomer in the independent market, it agreed to release the film. Comparing the title characters' appeal to Hollywood stars like Barbra Streisand and Robert Redford, founder Samuel Goldwyn Jr. remarked: "Having my [two] children, I know these bears are stars, too."

According to the 1985 edition of Guinness Film Facts and Feats, the Samuel Goldwyn Company spent up to US$24 million on the publicity budget for The Care Bears Movie, the largest at that time. The film's advertising budget was US$4 million; Variety reported that "the beneficiaries of [its] merchandising tie-ins have earmarked [the remaining] $20,000,000 to promo Care Bear products in step with the film's release". For the film's promotion, Goldwyn's staff partnered with Kenner Toys and the fast food chain Pizza Hut; there were also tie-ins on Trix cereal boxes. Parker Brothers published two tie-in books, Meet the Care Bear Cousins and Keep On Caring, shortly after the film's release; (Note: ISBN 0-910313-98-9 (Meet the Care Bear Cousins); ISBN 0-910313-84-9 (Keep On Caring).) both were reissued in October 1985 by Children's Press.

The Goldwyn staff came up with two advertising strategies, which tested well with the company—one was aimed at the film's target audience of children as young as age five; another targeted grown-ups, parents, and older children. In the words of Cliff Hauser, the distributor's executive director of marketing, "We didn't want parents to think the movie was threatening. So the big debate was—although the formula for success in animated film is the triumph of good over evil—how can you do that in single-image ads?" Jeff Lipsky, vice-president of theatrical at Goldwyn, referred to the first one as "the cheery approach"; ads therein featured the Care Bears on clouds, and carried the tagline "A movie that'll make the whole family care-a-lot". Hauser said, "That's one that a mother can look at and know she can take the 2-year-old to it and not worry." The other campaign, which Lipsky called "more Disney-esque", featured an evil tree whose hands reached out to capture the Bears; its tagline, "What happens when the world stops caring?", was also seen on the official poster. Bingham Ray, Goldwyn's vice-president of distribution, was involved in the promotional efforts.

Around opening time, Hirsh predicted that The Care Bears Movie would be its decade's response to Pinocchio and Snow White and the Seven Dwarfs, both from Walt Disney Productions. Loubert added, "These characters say something important to children. Our challenge has been to create a very distinct character for each Care Bear. A lot of effort went into bringing out their individuality." Some time afterward, Hirsh conceded that parents had to come to the film, out of respect for the dark content within. "Frightening scenes," he said, "are a necessity for the reality of the hero and villain—just as it works in nursery rhymes. Kids work out their fears this way." TCFC's Jack Chojnacki offered this vindication in The Wall Street Journal: "We consider a film one of the many products we license. When we started the whole Care Bears project we knew the importance of bears in the market but that there was a void. There were no specific bears. In the movie marketplace there was a void for good family-fare films." And, in the words of Carole MacGillvray, "Toy recognition drives this movie."

=== North America ===
"Nelvana has proven that pure, wholesome entertainment for the 2-to-10 age group can be successful."

— Edward Hansen, vice-president of animation, administration and production for Disney

"[W]hen watching a movie as sweet and tasty as The Care Bears Movie, a 4-year-old girl needs to have all the luxuries a Saturday matinee brings to stay in the right mood."

— Dan Bennett, in a San Diego Union-Tribune report on the film's popularity with young viewers

"The Care Bears Movie has become a word-of-mouth success—out of the mouths of babes, so to speak."

— Betsy Sharkey

The Care Bears Movie premiered in Washington, D.C., on March 24, 1985, as part of a Special Olympics benefit; Georgia Engel, the voice of Love-a-lot Bear, attended this event. The film opened on March 29, 1985, in the United States and Canada, as Nelvana's first widely released feature. It became surprisingly successful at the North American box office, playing primarily at matinees and early evening showings. At the time, the North American film industry was bereft of children's and family fare; with The Care Bears Movie, Hirsh said, "There's such a large audience for a film that appeals primarily to 6-year-olds." He remarked later on, "What we've done [at Nelvana] is tailor the film to a pre-literate audience, the very young. It's interesting to see the audience. The kids are fixated on the screen. [It's] awesome to them." Clive A. Smith observed that some children came to showings with their Bears; long line-ups held back its audience in several cities. Among those attending the matinee screenings was John Waters, a filmmaker known for controversial and cult classics Pink Flamingos (1972) and Polyester (1981). The film made an appearance at the USA Film Festival in Dallas, Texas, during its release.

When shown in theatres, the feature was immediately followed by Nelvana's TV special, Strawberry Shortcake Meets the Berrykins. It was directed by Laura Shepherd and produced by Nelvana's founders along with Lenora Hume. The story involves Strawberry Shortcake and a tiny group of creatures called the Berrykins as they work to clear their home of Strawberryland of the "world's favourite perfume", a pungent odour which was unleashed from a purple cloud. LBS Communications syndicated it on US television around the time of The Care Bears Movie's theatrical tenure; a video release from Family Home Entertainment soon followed.

The Care Bears Movie ranked fourth at the North American box office on its first two weekends, grossing US$3.7 million and US$3.2 million respectively. It was screened in 1,003 venues during its first four weeks. After three months, it grossed about US$23 million in the United States, (Note: Approximately US$68.7 million in 2025 dollars.) and placed 40th among 1985's major films; it brought in US$9,435,000 in rentals for the Goldwyn company. In Canada, the film was released by Astral Films and Criterion Pictures Corporation, and made C$1,845,000 by the end of 1985. It was the year's highest-grossing release in that market, followed by Disney's One Magic Christmas and a Quebec production called The Alley Cat (Le Matou).

Several months after The Care Bears Movie, Walt Disney Pictures released its animated feature The Black Cauldron. Costing US$25 million, it was the most expensive animated film of its time, but grossed less than Nelvana's production (US$21.3 million). As a result, The Care Bears Movie's performance alarmed animators at the Disney Studios; Don Bluth, a former recruit, dismissed the "public taste" factor that it demonstrated. Another animator, Ron Clements, later reflected on this: "Everyone was kind of scared about the future of Disney animation. It wasn't a good time. It was really a terrible time." This sentiment was echoed in Waking Sleeping Beauty, Disney's 2010 documentary on the revival of its animation unit. While comparing The Black Cauldron with The Care Bears Movie, Eleanor Ringel of The Atlanta Journal-Constitution singled out the "putrid pastels" of Nelvana's production and commented that they "don't even deserve to be mentioned in the same review." Months afterward, a re-issue of Disney's One Hundred and One Dalmatians surpassed both The Care Bears Movie and The Black Cauldron, with over US$30 million in sales.

Sometime after the film's release, Vestron Video picked up the video rights to The Care Bears Movie for US$1.8 million. It was released in the United States on July 10, 1985, in VHS and Betamax formats. On August 10, 1985, it debuted in 26th place on Billboard's Top Videocassette Rentals chart. It ranked fourth on the first edition of the magazine's Top Kid Video chart (on October 5). It was tracked by Video Insider's children's chart (on August 30, 1985), as one of five toy-related titles on tape (along with two compilations of Hasbro's Transformers series; another with Hallmark Cards' Rainbow Brite; and the last with Strawberry Shortcake). By 1988, Vestron's edition sold over 140,000 copies. In 1990, Video Treasures reissued it on videocassette; on October 10, 1995, Hallmark Home Entertainment published another VHS edition as part of a six-title package from Goldwyn and Britain's Rank Organisation.

On September 5, 2000, MGM Home Entertainment re-released the film on VHS under the MGM Family Entertainment label; (Note: In 1996, John Kluge of the Metromedia company acquired the Samuel Goldwyn Company for US$125 million. Metromedia sold its film units—Goldwyn, Orion Pictures, and the Motion Picture Corporation of America—to Metro-Goldwyn-Mayer (MGM) in April 1997.) (Note: Unlike the 2000 U.S. VHS re-release of All Dogs Go to Heaven (which still have the "Available exclusively through Warner Home Video." notice on its back cover), the 2000 U.S. VHS re-release of The Care Bears Movie did not available exclusively through Warner Home Video.) the DVD edition premiered on August 6, 2002, and was packaged with the 1978 British family film The Water Babies. In 2003, the film was inducted into the MGM Kids line. In honour of the Care Bears' 25th anniversary, another DVD edition of the film was released on March 20, 2007, with restored picture quality; it contained the franchise's second Atkinson Film-Arts special, The Care Bears Battle the Freeze Machine, as an extra. American Greetings launched an official anniversary website and a Dodge Grand Caravan giveaway as part of the proceedings. By 2007, home video sales of The Care Bears Movie totaled over five million units. It was later re-released by 20th Century Fox Home Entertainment on DVD on March 5, 2013. To date, this is the only theatrical Care Bears movie from the 1980s to be known for being successfully reissued, outselling A New Generation, which had not been reissued after the 2003 DVD release.

The Care Bears Movie was scheduled to premiere on the US premium television network, Disney Channel, on June 28, 1986, but did so one month in advance. In September 1987, the film made its terrestrial broadcast premiere on the ABC network's Saturday morning schedule. It also aired on American Movie Classics on July 7, 1991, and on Showtime and The Movie Channel in the 2000s. The film aired on Starz Entertainment's Encore channel in September 2007, as part of its "Big '80s" Labour Day marathon, chronicling various releases from that decade. It was among the first films shown on Canada's Moviepix channel in October 1994.

=== International ===
Amid the US and Canadian success of The Care Bears Movie, Goldwyn took the film to the 38th edition of the Cannes Film Festival, where it was highly received; a group of costumed Care Bears strolled along the Croisette to promote the picture. Among its international distributors was Germany's Filmwelt, which released it on March 20, 1986, under the title Der Glücksbärchi Film. It sold 538,487 tickets in that territory, placing 47th among new releases, and grossed over DM4,013,000 (€2,051,600; US$2,868,000). (Note: In 1986, the average price of a movie ticket in Germany was equivalent to €3.81.) (Note: Filmwelt is abbreviated as "FW" on the InsideKino chart.) The film was released on VHS in October 1986 by the local division of CBS/Fox Video, and aired on national broadcaster ARD during the 1988 Christmas season.

The Care Bears Movie was released in the United Kingdom by Miracle Films in August 1985, and did well in matinee-only engagements; a video edition from Vestron's local branch came out some months later. It was also released in Australia on December 12, 1985. In February 1986, the film was released by France's Artédis under the franchise name Les Bisounours; publishing rights were held by Hachette Livre. It opened on March 20, 1986, in the Netherlands as De Troetelbeertjes. On July 21, 1986, the Bermudez de Castro company opened the film in Madrid, Spain, as Los osos amorosos; it grossed over 23,728,000 Pts (€142,606; US$199,500) from 93,294 admissions. Among that country's Catalan speakers, it is known as Els Óssos Amorosos. The film was released in Czechoslovakia by Ústřední půjčovna filmů on December 1, 1988, as Starostliví medvídci. It was advertised in Italy as Orsetti del cuore, and in Poland as Opowieść o Troskliwych Misiach.

In Mexico, The Care Bears Movie was released on April 24, 1986, as Los ositos cariñositos. In Brazil, the film was promoted as As novas aventuras dos ursinhos carinhosos. Television airings occurred on Australia's Nine Network in 1987, Philippines' ABS-CBN in December 1992, and Malaysia's TV2 (in August 1993) and Disney Channel in April 2002.

=== Post-release ===
As opposed to Rock & Rule (which Nelvana owned outright), the characters in The Care Bears Movie were the property of American Greetings, who paid Nelvana a service fee to work on the film. Nelvana, however, hardly received any profits from the production; this caused its founders to express regret about the situation. In The Nelvana Story, Patrick Loubert explained the catch-22 that they would face numerous times in the years to come: "We could have waived our fee and taken a big piece of the film. We were offered that deal. But if we had waived the fee, we couldn't have made the payroll. Once the picture was hugely successful, we thought we should have waived the fee. But we couldn't have." At the time of production, Nelvana had begun embarking on service work that other companies provided them, not only to help ease the debts the studio incurred after Rock & Rule, but also because it proved profitable in due time.

By 1989, The Care Bears Movie made over US$34 million worldwide, according to Maclean's magazine; (Note: Approximately US$102 million in 2025 dollars.) (Note: In 1987, Long Island's Newsday newspaper gave a US$40 million figure for both this film and its sequel, A New Generation.) this made it the highest-grossing animated feature film to come from Canada, and the highest grossing animated film of 1985. It also became the highest-grossing animated film not produced by the Disney company, surpassing the US$11 million of Atlantic Entertainment Group's 1983 release The Smurfs and the Magic Flute; Don Bluth's An American Tail (1986) and The Land Before Time (1988) later took over this position. As of 2023, that title is held by Illumination Entertainment and Nintendo's The Super Mario Bros. Movie (2023), with US$1.288 billion. The film virtually saved a fledgling Nelvana from going out of business, and was the company's highest-grossing venture. (Note: In 1993, Hirsh and Loubert served as executive producers for the live-action thriller, Malice; its US$46.4 million domestic gross surpassed The Care Bears Movie's worldwide earnings. The Nelvana studio, however, is not credited in that film.) It is also among the highest-grossing releases from either incarnation of Samuel Goldwyn.

== Reception and legacy ==
=== Critical analysis ===
"Movies for 6-year-old girls are as scarce these days as hot fudge sundaes in the Sahara and, if The Care Bears Movie satisfies a first-grader's craving for diversion, then I am satisfied."

— Scott Cain, The Atlanta Journal-Constitution

"No one but a grinch would point out that The Care Bears Movie has a strange similarity to a 75-minute commercial for the snuggly little greeting card varmints on which it is based.

"No one but a craven wretch would stoop to pointing out that the animation in this theatrical release is no better than the goshawful techniques used to grind out those despicable Saturday morning TV cartoons. After all, even the Disney people aren't making them like the Disney people used to do."

— Arkansas Democrat-Gazette

"Understand that Care Bears: The Movie simply and logically in the merchandisers' minds follows Care Bears: The Pyjamas, Care Bears: The Lunchboxes, Care Bears: The Pillow Cases and, of course, Care Bears: The Bears, the stuffed toys that started it all."

— Joe Fox, The Windsor Star

"These multi-coloured ursine cartoon characters, with names like Funshine Bear, Love-a-lot Bear, Baby Hugs Bear—I won't go on—are about as nourishing for children as sugar is for their teeth. Why even the Americans should bother to create this syrupy bear garden called Care-a-lot, dripping with singing quadrupeds who want to save the world from evil, is a mystery to anyone who has seen the fun and fibre that can be obtained from infinitely better children's stories, especially the droll moral fables in Winnie the Pooh."

— Lain Johnstone, The Times

"While the practice usually has been for the movie to come first and the products second, this time around an audience has been created in advance by the products. It must work, judging from the number of very tiny tots who are crowding the matinee performances of this program. There is a temptation to hark back to the early Disney films in reviewing a movie such as this. There is a similarity in spirit, certainly, but not in execution. The animation is certainly good, but beyond that there is less concern for character delineation, for continuous action, for straightforward storytelling."

— Tony Mastroianni, Akron Beacon Journal

The Care Bears Movie received mixed reviews. During its original release, The Care Bears Movie had varying degrees of success with critics. The New York Times' Richard Grenier wrote, "[The film] recalls vintage Walt Disney, both in substance and in the style of hand animation." Rick Lyman of Knight Ridder News Services said in his review: "Any movie—even an animated one—that has characters with names such as Funshine Bear, Love-a-lot Bear, and Lotsa Heart Elephant is obviously going to rank quite high on the cute meter. And this one sends the needle right off the chart. You've never seen such cuteness." Adele Freedman also gave it a positive review, commenting: "[It] has a lot going for it if you can tolerate the Bears." Edward Jones of Virginia's The Free Lance-Star praised it, but stated that "More comedy would have helped broaden [its] appeal to older youngsters." The Deseret News of Utah gave it three stars out of four (a "Good" grade) with this comment: "Sticky sweet, but a nice message."

Michael Blowen began his review of the film by stating that "[it] satisfies the primary obligation of a bedtime story—before it's half over the children will be fast asleep." He added that "this sugar-coated trifle could only satisfy the most ardent Care Bears fan", and that "the characters themselves lack definition". The Arkansas Democrat-Gazette said, "Who except a callous scrooge would carp about the fact that The Care Bears Movie espouses a psychopop philosophy of 'sharing our feelings' that seems drawn straight from the pages on one of those insufferable self-motivation tomes? No one, that's who." Paul Attanasio of The Washington Post wrote, "The best cartoons recognize the dark side of kids, their penchant for violence, their fearful fantasies. [This movie] just patronizes them. It even has a child chortling, 'Aren't parents great!' Well, they are and they aren't, and kids know that."

The animation in the film received mixed reviews as well. Adele Freedman praised the style and backgrounds, and called the special effects "stunning". Likewise, John Stanley wrote that "The style is cartoonish and cute" in his 1988 film guide, Revenge of the Creature Features. While complimenting it as "a harmless film diversion", Stephen Hunter said that "the movie has the lustrous, glossy look of the very best in children's book illustrations". "On the other hand," he added, "the producers obviously couldn't afford an expensive [multiplane] camera, the staple of the Disney product, and so the scenes have a depressing flatness to them. And the backgrounds, so brilliantly developed in Disney, tend to be blurry and hastily done." Jim Moorhead of Florida's The Evening Independent said, "[Nelvana's] animation is not the best. Far from it. Everything's in pastels, fine details are largely missing, mouth movements are minimal and the motions of the figures are scarcely better than some of those awful Saturday morning cartoons on TV." The staff at Variety magazine stated that the "style ... tends towards a primer reading level." Halliwell's Film Guide called it "sluggishly animated and narrated". As with the Atlanta Journal-Constitution, The New York Times' Janet Maslin found that the quality paled in comparison to Disney features (in this case, 1940's Pinocchio).

The Los Angeles Times' Charles Solomon (in his 1989 book Enchanted Drawings: The History of Animation), and Michael Janusonis of Rhode Island's Providence Journal, faulted the plot. The Evening Independent's Moorhead and Jim Davidson of the Pittsburgh Press noticed at least two parallel storylines in the film, one of which involved the magician Nicholas. The National Coalition on Television Violence counted at least 20 acts of violence throughout the picture.

Critics questioned its purpose as a feature-length advertisement for Care Bears merchandise; among them were Charles Solomon, Paul Attanasio, The Morning Call of Pennsylvania, and Bill Cosford of The Miami Herald. The Boca Raton News' Skip Sheffield commented, "I couldn't help being bothered by the blatant commercialism of this whole venture." The British magazine Films and Filming remarked: "The purpose of the film is presumably to sell more toys as it unashamedly pushes the message that without at least one Care Bear around life can be very lonely." Stoffman observed, "one of the youngest target audiences of any animated movie", as did the Halliwell's staff; film critic Leonard Maltin (in his Movie Guide); and Henry Herx (in his Family Guide to Movies on Video).

The 1986 International Film Guide called it "an elementary piece of animation lacking colour and character, with not much humour, quite lacking in charm, and indifferently scored". Maltin gave it two stars out of four in his Movie Guide; similarly, the Gale Group publication, VideoHound's Golden Movie Retriever, gave it two bones out of four in its 1997 edition. (Note: The Golden Movie Retriever uses bones as its equivalent of stars. According to the staff's "Bone Ratings" system, a title given two bones "May be perfectly delightful for certain tastes. A waste of time for others. Usually uninspired genre flicks.") According to Derek Owen of Time Out's Film Guide, "Adults forced to accompany three-year-olds to the movie would have had a little moment of satisfaction when the time came to shovel the Care Bears toys out of the house into landfill sites."

The mixed reception carried on in the years ahead: in her 1995 book Inside Kidvid, Loretta MacAlpine said of the film and its subsequent follow-ups, "If you can hack the sugarcoated attitudes of this group of cuddly bears, more power to you! There's nothing insidious about the Care Bears, but their overbearing sweetness may not appeal to all viewers." She cautioned parents of the merchandising aspect behind the tapes. Dave Gathman of Illinois' Courier-News wrote in 1998, "One Care Bears Movie ... can give all G-rated entertainment a bad name." In 2003 the Erie Times-News acknowledged its financial success, but commented on its "lack of a creative title". Animation expert Jerry Beck wrote in his 2005 book, The Animated Movie Guide, "It's a simple, serviceable adventure with several standout sequences. ... There's no doubt about it, this is a children's film aimed at the under-seven crowd. But it's one of the better animated children's films produced during this period."

Common Sense Media gave this movie some average reviews, as the group stated "The Care Bears Movie was made for young kids, but this movie's plot has some dark scenes and parents will want to be close at hand to comfort young viewers."

The Care Bears Movie holds a 50% rating on Rotten Tomatoes based on 8 reviews.

In the words of Jerry Beck, "[The Care Bears Movie's] box-office gross signalled to Hollywood a renewed interest in animated features, albeit for children. This is something The Secret of NIMH tried to accomplish but failed to do." A plethora of children's and family film entertainment followed in its wake, such as Sesame Street Presents: Follow That Bird from Warner Bros., and a re-issue of Universal Studios' E.T. the Extra-Terrestrial. Atlantic Releasing joined this movement by establishing Clubhouse Pictures, which showed G-rated films during 1986. Nelvana's film helped to bring back matinee engagements to prominence across North America.

Mentioning The Care Bears Movie as "the most recent example", Charles Solomon brought up the subject of feature-length toy adaptations in an April 1985 interview on Los Angeles' KUSC-FM. He spoke to Warner Bros. animator Chuck Jones, who replied: "I feel that it's proper—after all, that's the way Alice in Wonderland was written: the dolls were all made first, then they made the picture about the dolls, right?" In July 1985, Sarah Stiansen of United Press International (UPI) called The Care Bears Movie "another licensing innovation for TCFC", following the department's previous endeavours. UPI's Vernon Scott (in 1985), and Bruce A. Austin (in his 1989 book Immediate Seating), observed how the merchandising arrived in advance of the film's release. In forthcoming years, several media adaptations based on established toy lines would follow a similar marketing tactic. Examples included films based on Hasbro's Transformers (in 1986 and 2007) and My Little Pony (in 1986, 2017, and 2021); Tonka's GoBots (Battle of the Rock Lords) and Pound Puppies (Legend of Big Paw); and a television series and feature with Hallmark's Rainbow Brite.

=== In popular culture ===
The Care Bears Movie was parodied in "At the Movies", a 1991 episode of Nickelodeon and Klasky Csupo's animated series Rugrats. In that episode, the Pickles family goes to see The Land Without Smiles, starring the Dummi Bears (although Grandpa Lou, while disgruntingly viewing said feature, would later call it "Land Without Brains").

=== Allusions ===
Critics of the film compared the Spirit (voiced by Jackie Burroughs) to The Queen from Disney's Snow White and the Seven Dwarfs.

In his Christian Science Monitor review, David Sterritt observed that The Care Bears Movie was mostly influenced by The Sorcerer's Apprentice, a 1797 poem by German author Johann Wolfgang von Goethe, along with "a trace of H. P. Lovecraft that probably wasn't intended. ... I also noticed a subtle sexism at work. Why must it be the little girl [Kim] who dreams of being a nurse and the little boy [Jason] of being a jet pilot—and not the other way around, to stimulate young imaginations instead of echoing past patterns?" Blowen wrote that the two children both get turned "from cynics to idealists". Joe Fox of Ontario's The Windsor Star, and Stephen Hunter, compared the Bears' home of Care-a-lot to King Arthur's mythical castle of Camelot; Blowen commented that in this place, "altruism is king". Hunter noted that "the celestial physics are left vague", concerning Kim and Jason's trip from Care-a-lot to the Forest of Feelings. Critics compared at least two aspects of the film to Disney's Snow White and the Seven Dwarfs: the Spirit received similarities to the Magic Mirror and the Wicked Queen, but Charles Solomon said that the Bears lacked the individual qualities of the Dwarfs. Solomon noted that in animated features of that era, villains such as the Spirit "lacked motivation—if the viewer accepts their evil intentions, it's only because he's been told to". According to Tom Ogden (in his 1997 book Wizards and Sorcerers: From Abracabadra to Zoroaster), the Bears' Stare against the Spirit serves as a kind of white magic. (Note: According to Ogden's Wizards and Sorcerers, "White magic calls on natural forces or appeals to angelic spirits in order to provide benevolent results.") Bruce Bailey wrote in The Montreal Gazette, "Such a non-violent solution, should sit well with peace lobbyists". According to a 2005 article in The Times of London, an Internet reviewer called The Care Bears Movie "a fine example of Christian socialism".

=== Accolades ===
At the 1985 Genie Awards in its native Canada, The Care Bears Movie won the Golden Reel Award for being the country's highest-grossing film of the year. Ron Cohen, president of the Academy of Canadian Cinema and Television, presented the award to producers Hirsh, Loubert, and Smith. John Sebastian's "Nobody Cares Like a Bear" received a Genie nomination for Best Original Song; his performance was part of CBC's live telecast of the ceremony on March 20, 1986. The film received a Young Artist Award nomination for "Best Family Animation Series or Special", but lost to the CBS series The Charlie Brown and Snoopy Show. During its 21st annual award ceremony on October 17, 1985, Nashville's performance rights organization SESAC honoured Woodward and Bird for their songwriting efforts.

== Follow-ups ==
After the release of The Care Bears Movie, DIC Entertainment produced a syndicated 11-episode television series featuring the title characters. Another series, Nelvana's The Care Bears Family, premiered on ABC in the US and Canada's Global in September 1986, and was subsequently broadcast in 140 countries. Nelvana followed the first film with another two theatrical installments, Care Bears Movie II: A New Generation (1986) and The Care Bears Adventure in Wonderland (1987); neither made as much of a critical or commercial impact. A New Generation, released by Columbia Pictures, made over US$8.5 million in North America and US$12 million worldwide Adventure in Wonderland was self-financed by Nelvana and released by Cineplex Odeon Films, and grossed US$2.608 million domestically, with worldwide earnings of US$6 million; it barely recovered its costs. Because of this, Michael Hirsh later declared, "It was just one sequel too many." The Bears returned for one more animated production, Care Bears Nutcracker Suite, which debuted on video and television in December 1988. The franchise's next feature film, 2004's Journey to Joke-a-lot, also premiered on video (via Lionsgate and Family Home Entertainment).

== See also ==
- Canadian films of the 1980s
- List of Nelvana franchises
- List of animated feature-length films

== Notes ==
Awards
Preceded by The Dog Who Stopped the War (La Guerre des tuques) (1985)	Canadian Golden Reel Award; 1986	Succeeded by The Decline of the American Empire (Le Déclin de l'empire américain) (1987)
