= Arna Selznick =

Canadian animator

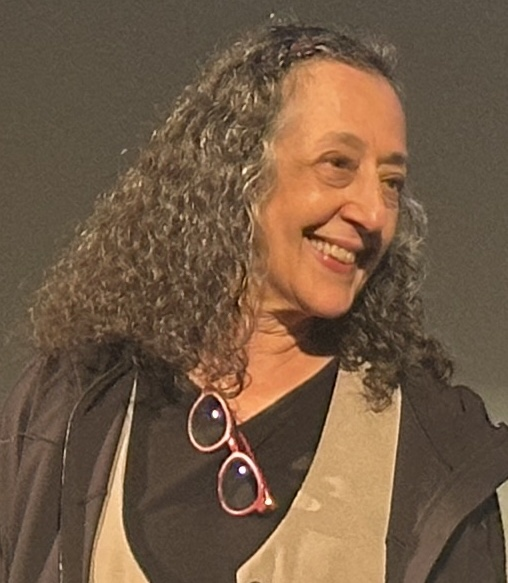
- Selznick in 2025
- Occupation: Animator
- Years active: 1980s–present
- Employer: Nelvana (1980s)
- Known for: Directing The Care Bears Movie (1985)
- Spouse: John van Bruggen
- Children: Max Douglas
- Website: dancingmonkeys

Arna Selznick is a Canadian animator, best known for directing Nelvana's 1985 animated film The Care Bears Movie. Arna owns and operates a studio called Dancingmonkeys with her husband/partner John van Bruggen.

== Career ==
Selznick began her career at Toronto's Nelvana studio, participating in several efforts such as a layout artist on Rock & Rule, Story Supervisor on 64 half-hours for Inspector Gadget and Director on Strawberry Shortcake and the Baby Without a Name. There, she met future husband John van Bruggen. She moved on to direct The Care Bears Movie, released in 1985 by the Samuel Goldwyn Company in the United States, and Astral Films and Criterion Pictures Corporation in Canada. The film won Canada's Golden Reel Award for highest-grossing local production in 1985, with the Canadian gross of $22,934,622.00. Quite remarkable, since children's admission at the time was about $3.50 or less. At the time of that film's release, Arna was probably only the third woman to direct an animated feature (after Lotte Reiniger of 1927's The Adventures of Prince Achmed, and Joy Batchelor of 1954's Animal Farm). (Note: In 1998, Selznick was followed by Brenda Chapman of DreamWorks Animation's The Prince of Egypt.) Selznick was part of the layout unit on the next two Care Bears films, A New Generation (1986) and Adventure in Wonderland (1987), and was also a story artist on Wonderland.

In 1986, Selznick launched the dancingmonkeys studio in Toronto, partnering with director/screenwriter John van Bruggen. In 2005, she and van Bruggen created Coolman!, part of the FunPak series on Canada's YTV network. Selznick has been on story teams for several other children's films and television series, among them Nelvana's Clone High; Disney's Return to Never Land; the British animated feature The King's Beard; the Nicktoons sci-fi saga Skyland; Treehouse TV's Toot & Puddle; and many other productions (Beetlejuice, Doug, Miss Spider's Sunny Patch Kids, Bob and Margaret, among others).

While Stephen Hunter of the Houston Chronicle gave a mixed response to the animation of The Care Bears Movie, he wrote that director Selznick "has a nice feel for the dynamics of action animation; several of the set-pieces zing along nicely."

Selznick completed two years, 2014-2016 as a key member of the story team of the CG animated feature film, The Nut Job 2, produced in Toronto by ToonBox Entertainment.

From 2017 to 2018, she directed the award-winning The Most Magnificent Thing for Corus's Nelvana, based on the popular children's book by Ashley Spires, narrated by Whoopi Goldberg, screenplay by John van Bruggen. In it, a young girl receives a tool kit as a gift and decides to make something magnificent for her faithful dog companion, but the creative process proves more challenging than expected.

From 2019 to 2020, she was a story artist on the feature animated film: PAW Patrol: The Movie.

From 2020 to 2021, she was the development director for an independent animated short.
