= Strawberry Shortcake Meets the Berrykins =

1985 Canadian animated television special

- Genre: Animation; Musical
- Written by: Peter Sauder
- Directed by: Laura Shepherd
- Starring: Russi Taylor; Jeri Craden; Susan Roman; Chris Wiggins; Robert Ridgely; Melleny Brown; Laurie Waller; Susan Snooks
- Narrated by: Chris Wiggins
- Theme music composer: Patricia Cullen; Songs composed by: John Sebastian
- Country of origin: Canada
- Original language: English

Production
- Executive producers: Carole MacGillvray; Paul Pressler
- Producers: Michael Hirsh; Patrick Loubert; Clive A. Smith
- Editor: Gordon Kidd
- Running time: 23 minutes
- Production companies: Nelvana Limited; Those Characters from Cleveland (uncredited)

Original release
- Release: March 29, 1985

Strawberry Shortcake Meets the Berrykins is a Canadian animated television special that premiered on March 29, 1985. This is the third and final Strawberry Shortcake television special from Nelvana Limited, and the last one to feature the American Greetings character up until DIC revived the franchise for a new generation in 2003. Unlike the previous two specials which were distributed by LBS Communications, the third special was distributed in syndication.

In 1985, the special gained popularity in the United Kingdom when it was used as a theatrical featurette with The Care Bears Movie, premiering the same day that the special premiered, introducing the Strawberry Shortcake franchise to a British public who at the time were largely unaware of it.

== Synopsis ==
Strawberry rids Strawberryland of a strange, horrible smelling purple cloud with the help of her new friends, the Berry Princess and her helpers, the Berrykins.

Strawberry Shortcake Meets the Berrykins featured the first (and only) animated appearance of new friend Banana Twirl, and the Berry Princess, mystical guardian of the sprite-like Berrykins.

Strawberry's friends Blueberry Muffin, Raspberry Tart, Lemon Meringue and Lime Chiffon were all featured in this special, but they were not merchandised as part of 1985's "Berrykins" line of dolls by Kenner. Furthermore, Mint Tulip, who was produced as a "Berrykins" doll, was the only one not to appear in this special.

== Release ==
This special was released on VHS on March 13, 1992 by Family Home Entertainment.

Preceded by Strawberry Shortcake and the Baby Without a Name	1980's Strawberry Shortcake specials 1985	Succeeded by N/A
