= Strawberry Shortcake and the Baby Without a Name =

1984 animated TV special

- Genre: Animation; Comedy; Family; Musical
- Written by: Peter Sauder
- Directed by: Arna Selznick
- Starring: Russi Taylor; Chris Wiggins
- Theme music composer: Patricia Cullen; Songs composed by: Bob Chimbel; Merry Loomis
- Country of origin: Canada
- Original language: English

Production
- Producers: Michael Hirsh; Patrick Loubert; Clive A. Smith
- Editors: Rob Kirkpatrick; Alison Clark; Don Lauder; Keith Traver
- Running time: 23 minutes
- Production companies: MAD Productions; Nelvana Limited; Those Characters from Cleveland (uncredited)

Original release
- Network: Syndication
- Release: March 24, 1984

Strawberry Shortcake and the Baby Without a Name is a 1984 American animated television special that first premiered on March 24 in New York City and on March 30 in Los Angeles. This is the second Strawberry Shortcake television special produced by Nelvana Limited and the fifth to feature the American Greetings character.

== Synopsis ==
Strawberry Shortcake and the Baby Without a Name chronicles Strawberry Shortcake's annual summer camping trip, where she and her friends encounter a monster that the Pieman and Sour Grapes attempt to capture to get rich.

== Cast ==
Name	Character	Source
Russi Taylor	Strawberry Shortcake	
Robert Ridgely	Purple Pieman	
Jeri Craden	Sour Grapes / Fig-Boot	
Melleny Brown	Lemon Meringue / Lime Chiffron	
Cree Summer (Note: Credited as Cree Summer Francks.)	Orange Blossom	
Monica Parker	The Baby	
Susan Roman	Peach Blush / Blueberry Muffin	
Laurie Waller	Plum Puddin'	
Chris Wiggins	Mr. Sun / Narrator	

== Production ==
As with Housewarming Surprise, Bernard Loomis and Carole MacGillvray served as executive producers on Baby Without a Name.

== Release ==
The special aired on March 24, 1984, on WCBS-TV in New York City, and on March 30 on KTLA in Los Angeles.

== Home media ==
A VHS cassette of this special was released in 1984 by Family Home Entertainment.

== Notes ==
Preceded by Strawberry Shortcake: Housewarming Surprise	1980's Strawberry Shortcake specials 1984	Succeeded by Strawberry Shortcake Meets the Berrykins
