= Peter Hudecki =

Canadian animator

- Born: 1954; Canada
- Occupations: Animator, Professor
- Years active: 1977–present
- Awards: Gemini Awards, Emmy Awards

Peter Hudecki (born 1954) is an animator. He directed the Roseanne Barr animated series Little Rosey, and was Chief Modelmaker for Gemini Award- and Emmy Award-winning series Rolie Polie Olie.

== Biography ==
Peter Hudecki, a 45-year veteran in the animation industry, has fulfilled multiple roles, including director and producer. Some of his earlier experiences include animation work for television series such as Scooby-Doo and The Flintstones.

== Career ==
Hudecki originally was an animator at Nelvana starting from A Cosmic Christmas in 1977 through Rock & Rule in 1983. He was storyboard supervisor for the first season of Inspector Gadget. He was a line producer for 1986's Care Bears Movie II: A New Generation, as well as for Ewoks and Droids for Lucasfilm. In 1990, he directed the Roseanne Barr animated series Little Rosey, produced by Nelvana for the American Broadcasting Company.

He was line producer for Babar, and a second-unit director on the series The Adventures of Tintin. He was a storyboard artist for the live action films Cocktail, The Freshman, Searching for Bobby Fischer, A Simple Wish and Bless the Child. In television, he was also a storyboard artist for Nickelodeon's Animorphs and Nick Jr.'s The Backyardigans. He also had the same job for Showtime's original movies Deacons for Defense, Soldier's Girl and Jasper, Texas.

He was Chief Modelmaker for Gemini Award- and Emmy Award-winning series Rolie Polie Olie.

He has been involved various commercials, including Rice Krispies, 7Up, and Planters Peanuts; and provided the main lip sync and facial animation for the Bud Light commercial Smooth Monkey during the 2004 Super Bowl.

Hudecki has lectured and taught at various post-secondary institutions, and is a senior instructor on the digital animation program at Durham College.

== Awards ==
Years	Awards
2005	Lip sync in Animation, Toronto Animated Image Society
