= Dale Schott =

Canadian animator, writer and storyboard artist

- Born: Norfolk, Ontario
- Education: Sheridan College
- Occupation: Animation crewmember
- Years active: 1979–present
- Known for: Directing Care Bears Movie II: A New Generation (1986)

Dale Schott is a Canadian animator, writer and storyboard artist, best known for directing the 1986 animated film Care Bears Movie II: A New Generation.

== Career ==
Over the years, Schott has served on various productions as an "animator, overseas animation supervisor, storyboard artist, director, writer and story editor". After graduating from the animation program at Ontario's Sheridan College in 1979, he started working at several studios, among them Toronto's Nelvana. He was a "'junior' animator" on its TV special Take Me Up to the Ball Game, and its first feature, 1983's Rock & Rule. He was a storyboard artist for the first season of the DIC television series, Inspector Gadget, which was produced at Nelvana as work-for-hire.

Schott also storyboarded 1985's The Care Bears Movie, and made his directorial debut in the 1986 follow-up A New Generation. Later on, he was also among the crew of Ewoks (a Nelvana/Lucasfilm collaboration), the original Babar series, and Rupert.
