= Care Bears Movie II: A New Generation =

1986 animated film by Dale Schott

- Theatrical release poster
- Directed by: Dale Schott
- Written by: Peter Sauder
- Produced by: Michael Hirsh; Patrick Loubert; Clive A. Smith
- Starring: Maxine Miller; Pam Hyatt; Cree Summer; Hadley Kay; Alyson Court; Billie Mae Richards; Chris Wiggins
- Edited by: Evan Landis
- Music by: Patricia Cullen
- Production companies: Nelvana Limited; LBS Communications; Wang Film Productions; Those Characters from Cleveland, LLC
- Distributed by: Columbia Pictures
- Release dates: March 7, 1986 (limited); March 21, 1986 (North America) (Note: In the U.S. and Canadian domestic market, wide release occurs when a film is playing in 600 or more theatres.)
- Running time: 76 minutes
- Countries: Canada; United States
- Language: English
- Budget: At least $3.4 million
- Box office: $12 million

Care Bears Movie II: A New Generation is a 1986 animated musical fantasy film co-produced by LBS Communications and Nelvana Limited, and released by Columbia Pictures. It is the third animated feature from Nelvana and a prequel to The Care Bears Movie and second film in the Care Bears franchise. It was directed by Dale Schott, written by Peter Sauder, and produced by Nelvana's three founders; Michael Hirsh, Patrick Loubert, and Clive A. Smith. It stars the voices of Alyson Court, Cree Summer, Maxine Miller and Hadley Kay. In the story, The Great Wishing Star (voiced by Chris Wiggins) tells the origins of the Care Bears and the story of their first Caring Mission. True Heart Bear and Noble Heart Horse lead the other Care Bears and Care Bear Cousins in aiding Christy, a young camper who is tempted by the evil shape-shifting Dark Heart. This is also the first appearance of the Care Bear Cubs, who also had their own line of toys.

A New Generation was made over a seven-month period at Nelvana's Toronto facilities, with additional work handled by Taiwan's Wang Film Productions, and involved several crew members who had worked on The Care Bears Movie. Patricia Cullen served as composer, and Los Angeles musicians Dean and Carol Parks worked on the film's six songs.

Upon its release in March 21, 1986, A New Generation gained negative attention for its unnecessary merchandising tie-ins, poor animation quality, and frightening themes for a children's movie. Some of its key elements received comparisons to the German legend Faust and J. M. Barrie's Peter Pan. The film grossed only $8.5 million in North America, about a third of what the previous installment earned, and over $12 million worldwide. It was released on video in August 21, 1986, and the final home media release to date was a Blu-ray issued in August 2021. The film was followed by The Care Bears Adventure in Wonderland in 1987.

== Plot ==
On the ocean, a yellow bear named True Heart Bear and a purple horse named Noble Heart Horse sail a giant ship, looking after a pack of baby animals known as the Care Bear Cubs and Care Bear Cousin Cubs. (Note: Introduced by American Greetings in 1984, the Care Bear Cousins are a group of animals who serve as relatives to the Care Bears. The group consists of different species, such as a monkey, an elephant and a penguin; Noble Heart Horse is one of them. The characters made their official debut in The Care Bears Movie.) Their journey is disrupted when a red sea serpent attacks. The serpent is one of many forms of Dark Heart, an evil shape-shifting spirit that brings chaos to the land. They escape by following a rainbow up to the sky, their boat transforming into the Cloud Clipper. (Note: The Cloud Clipper is seen and mentioned by name in "Lost at Sea", an episode of Nelvana's The Care Bears Family.) In the sky, they meet the Great Wishing Star, who gives each creature a unique symbol on their chest, indicating their role or specialty. True Heart and Noble Heart become the founders of the Kingdom of Caring, a land which comprises Care-a-Lot and the Forest of Feelings.

For the Bears' first Caring Mission, True Heart and Swift Heart Rabbit travel to Earth at a summer camp. There, they meet Christy, a kind and determined young girl, and her best friends, twins John and Dawn. The children are frustrated by the boastful "Camp Champ", who dominates every contest. When they confront him, he assigns them to trash duty. Upset, Christy runs away with her friends, only to get lost in the forest. True Heart rescues John and Dawn, bringing them to the Kingdom of Caring. The twins learn about the Caring Meter, which measures caring on Earth. While Noble Heart and True Heart search for Dark Heart and Christy, the twins are tasked with babysitting the Cubs. In the forest, Christy meets Dark Heart disguised as a teenage boy. She wishes to become the new Camp Champ; he grants her wish, but warns she must pay him back later. Aware of Dark Heart's potential, True Heart and Noble Heart relocate the Bear Cubs to Care-a-Lot and the Cousin Cubs to the Forest of Feelings. Both sets quickly mature to become the Care Bear Family.

Later, as the Family prepares an anniversary celebration for the Kingdom's founders, Dark Heart infiltrates Care-a-Lot disguised as a repairman. The Star Buddies, the Great Wishing Star's standing army, repel him, and the Family unites against him, using their "Care Bear Stare" and "Care Cousin Call" to drive him away. True Heart and Noble Heart depart to pursue Dark Heart, leaving the Family to handle missions. During the Family's patrol, they spot Christy stranded in a canoe, but Dark Heart attacks as an aura of mist. The Family is captured and trapped in his magic bag, fulfilling the favor Christy owed. Realizing Christy's alliance with Dark Heart, Tenderheart Bear holds a press wheel in the Hall of Hearts. John and Dawn, after being rescued from a possessed moose, join the Family's discussion of their plan to defeat Dark Heart.

That night, Dark Heart brainwashes the campers to wreak havoc. The Family attempts to rescue its captured members, only for Dark Heart to imprison them inside rubies on a chandelier. John and Dawn convince the guilt-ridden Christy to turn against Dark Heart by admitting her deed and vowing to stop him. True Heart and Noble Heart, tricked earlier by Dark Heart into leaving the Family alone, join the children in a raid on Dark Heart's lair. When Dark Heart foils the party's attempt to steal a necklace with a key, Christy confronts Dark Heart and demands that he release the Family. He refuses, reveals the trapped Family, and attacks True Heart and Noble Heart. Christy tries to intervene, but is struck by one of Dark Heart's lightning bolts. Before seemingly dying, she flicks a marble into the lever holding up the chandelier, breaking it and freeing the Family. With her last breaths, Christy tells Dark Heart that whether good or bad, he is still a person.

Dark Heart's evil magic fades and he begs the Family to save Christy. Everyone, including the Family, the twins, a hesitant Dark Heart, and the film's audience, chants that they care. Christy is revived, and the group escapes Dark Heart's collapsing lair. Dark Heart, freed from the dark magic, permanently becomes human. After a large celebration, the Family bids farewell to the campers and returns home. The film ends with the Great Wishing Star delivering an ending speech thanking the viewers, followed by Harmony Bear and Brave Heart paddling a rowboat past the castle and flashbacks of the Family's childhood.

== Cast ==
Name	Character
Hadley Kay	Dark Heart/The Boy
Chris Wiggins	Great Wishing Star
Cree Summer (Note: Credited as Cree Summer Francks.)	Christy
Alyson Court	Dawn
Michael Fantini	John
Sunny Besen Thrasher	Camp Champ
Maxine Miller	True Heart Bear
Pam Hyatt	Noble Heart Horse
Dan Hennessey	Brave Heart Lion
Billie Mae Richards	Tenderheart Bear
Eva Almos	Friend Bear
Bob Dermer	Grumpy Bear
Patrice Black	Share Bear/Funshine Bear
Nonnie Griffin	Harmony Bear
Jim Henshaw	Bright Heart Raccoon
Melleny Brown	Cheer Bear
Janet-Laine Green	Wish Bear
Marla Lukofsky	Playful Heart Monkey
Gloria Figura	Bedtime Bear

== Production ==
=== Development ===
The Care Bears franchise was created in 1981 by Those Characters from Cleveland, a division of the greeting card company American Greetings. Early in their tenure, the characters appeared as toys from the Kenner company, and also in greeting cards by Elena Kucharik. They starred in two syndicated television specials from a Canadian animation studio, Atkinson Film-Arts of Ottawa: The Care Bears in the Land Without Feelings (1983) and The Care Bears Battle the Freeze Machine (1984). After the specials, Toronto's Nelvana studio produced the first Care Bears Movie in less than eight months. It was distributed in the United States by The Samuel Goldwyn Company, an independent outfit, and grossed US$22.9 million at the North American box office, the largest amount for a non-Disney animated film at the time. This success guaranteed production of a second film, which was in consideration by May 1985. As with the original, production took place at Nelvana's facilities and Taiwan's Wang Film Productions; the Canadian studio also hired South Korean personnel to handle inking and painting. This time, over one hundred Nelvana animators worked on the film over a seven-month period that lasted until February 1986; the company itself received credit for the story development. American Greetings and Kenner commissioned Nelvana to make the sequel on contract; television syndicator LBS Communications, a co-financier of the first one, became the producer and presenter.

Care Bears Movie II was Nelvana's third animated feature film, after 1983's Rock & Rule and The Care Bears Movie. It marked the directorial debut of Dale Schott, a Nelvana staff member who served as assistant director on the first Care Bears Movie, as well as the Nelvana/Lucasfilm TV series Ewoks. Several other crewmembers from the first film returned to the fold; Nelvana's founders (Michael Hirsh, Patrick Loubert and Clive A. Smith) served as producers, while Peter Sauder wrote the screenplay and Charles Bonifacio handled animation duties. Jack Chojnacki, the co-president of American Greetings' licensing division Those Characters from Cleveland, served once again as an executive producer. A roster of Toronto voice actors—among them Cree Summer, Sunny Besen Thrasher, Dan Hennessey and Hadley Kay—appeared in this follow-up. Mickey Rooney and Georgia Engel, who appeared in the first film, did not return.

At one point, The Samuel Goldwyn Company was about to release A New Generation, but lost the distribution rights after turning down demands from the producers. Eventually, Nelvana went into negotiations with Columbia Pictures, which acquired worldwide theatrical rights in early 1986. (Note: Up to this point, Columbia Pictures had also acquired several foreign and independently produced films since the 1950s and 1960s, all made outside its facilities. As Clive Hirschhorn states in The Columbia Story, the company was mainly involved in the advertising campaign for said product.) This led founder Samuel Goldwyn Jr. to remark: "The fact that Columbia is distributing the Care Bears sequel is typical of the greed of the big studios. Someone else has to go in and prove something works, then a studio will charge in." By contrast, Goldwyn acquired the rights to the original film after major U.S. studios passed on it; they did not see the financial potential in a movie aimed strictly for children.

=== Allusions ===
To help save Christy, True Heart Bear (Maxine Miller) turns to the film's audience and tells them, "If you have ever cared, do it now." Critics found this scene similar to one in J. M. Barrie's Peter Pan.

According to Richard Freedman of the Newhouse News Service, "This must be the first version of the Faust myth in which not only does Faust (or Faustina [Christy], here) manage to weasel out of the pact with the Devil, but succeeds in regenerating him, as well." Elliot Krieger of Rhode Island's Providence Journal also took note of such a theme, headlining his review "Faust goes to summer camp". In regards to continuity issues, a reviewer in The Scarecrow Movie Guide observed a "montage showing the Care Bears and their Cousins growing up together from infancy to full Care Bear maturation—nullifying everything that happened in the first movie". (Note: The Scarecrow Movie Guide mentions this scene as occurring at the start of the film; it actually occurs nearly half an hour in.) (Note: In the original Care Bears Movie, the Care Bears met the Cousins in the Forest of Feelings; those characters only received their tummy symbols at the end of the film. In A New Generation, the Bears and Cousins received their symbols when they were orphan Cubs.) Mike McLane of Florida's Gainesville Sun gave a few suggestions of the storyline's possible religious subtext. He compared the Great Wishing Star to God, the Bears' "beautiful cloud kingdom" of Care-a-Lot to Heaven, and Dark Heart to Satan; he also hinted that the Bears protected humankind like angels did.

Charles Solomon pointed out that the film's climax, in which the Bears help revive Christy, "borrows...flagrantly from Peter Pan". The Scarecrow contributor took note of this aspect, writing, "There's an excruciating scene where the Care Bears turn to the audience and plead for help in the form of excessive and focused caring." In his critique, Hal Lipper called it the "Tinker Bell Principle", whereupon the audience must come together to save a dying character. In Vincent Canby's opinion, the Great Wishing Star "looks like Tinker Bell if she were a star-shaped beanbag".

=== Music ===
Care Bears Movie II: Original Soundtrack Recording

Soundtrack album by Dean Parks, Carol Parks, Debbie Allen and Stephen Bishop
- Released: 1986
- Genre: Children's music
- Labels: Kid Stuff Records; DAR 3905 (LP) / DAT 4905 (Cassette)
- Producers: Dean and Carol Parks

As with the original film, Patricia Cullen composed the score for Care Bears Movie II. The soundtrack album was released in LP format by Kid Stuff Records. Los Angeles musicians Dean and Carol Parks were credited as producers, writers and performers of the film's six songs, which were included on the album. Stephen Bishop, performer of the Oscar-nominated "It Might Be You" from Tootsie, and Debbie Allen from the TV series Fame, were on hand as vocalists. John Braden arranged and edited the album.

The Parks recorded their contributions to the project at their home. At the time of production, they shared their experiences of working on the soundtrack:

Our children helped us tremendously with their feedback as real Care Bear fans. When we took on this project, we made up our mind not to write down to children. There's a huge library of over-simplistic music available to children, but kids love music and they have very sophisticated tastes. When Debbie came over to the house to record 'Care Bears Cheer Song,' she brought her baby and nanny and manager and everyone had a great time.

— Carol Parks

The songs are particularly important because they forward the movement and reflect the action and feelings of the story. We try to make it so that everyone can relate to the music.

— Dean Parks

Paul Attanasio of The Washington Post gave a mixed response to the film's music. "The songs are dopey," he said, "but the score [...], which is mostly seven kinds of sprightly, has its occasional moments." Vincent Canby wrote in his review, "[There are] unseen loudspeakers [that] pour out a nonstop Hit Parade of songs to be interred by, including 'I Care for You,' 'Our Beginning' and 'Forever Young.'" But Joe Fox of The Windsor Star recommended it, adding, "[W]henever things start to drag a snappy tune comes along to get everyone interested."

Song	Vocal(s) by	Notes
"Our Beginning"	Carol Parks	
"Flying My Colours"	Dean and Carol Parks	Additional lyrics: Alan O'Day; Background vocals: Amanda and Acacia Parks (Note: Amanda and Acacia are the Parks' daughters.)
"I Care for You"	Stephen Bishop	Background vocal: Carol Parks
"Growing Up"	Stephen Bishop	Background vocal: Carol Parks
"The Fight Song"	Debbie Allen	Background vocals: Carol, Acacia and Amanda Parks
"Forever Young"	Carol Parks	

== Release ==
Care Bears Movie II: A New Generation introduced the Care Bear Cubs and the Care Bear Cousin Cubs, younger versions of the franchise characters.

=== North America ===
Initially intended for a mid-year release, Care Bears Movie II opened on March 7, 1986, in the U.S. and Canada, grossing US$243,161 from 55 theatres, and US$449,649 by its first few days. At this stage, it managed to rank above a reissue of Disney's 1959 production Sleeping Beauty, which also premiered that same weekend. However, when the final weekend box office results were announced Sleeping Beauty outgrossed Care Bears II by $59,000. Its wide-release opening on March 21 brought in $2.5 million from 1,446 theatres, placing seventh on the box office chart. Over the next two weekends, it earned little more than $1 million in 12th place. During release, it faced competition from another toy-based film, Atlantic Releasing's GoBots: Battle of the Rock Lords. At the time A New Generation opened, Richard Martin of the Ottawa Citizen commented: "... The first Care Bears movie has become the most successful non-Disney animated feature ever. This second movie from Nelvana could very well surpass that record, since it held the attention of all but the youngest members of the first-night audience and even has something to offer adults." Ultimately, this installment earned US$8,540,346 (Note: Approximately US$24.8 million in 2025 dollars.) in North America—about a third of what the previous one earned; over US$1 million of this total came from Canada. By 1988, it made over US$12 million worldwide. (Note: Approximately US$35.2 million in 2025 dollars.)

=== Overseas ===
Care Bears Movie II made its debut in the United Kingdom, via Columbia-EMI-Warner Distributors, on July 25, 1986; it later appeared on home video in that country under the RCA/Columbia Pictures and Video Collection International labels. Warner-Columbia Film of France released it on April 8, 1987 as Les Bisounours II—Une nouvelle génération; publishing rights were held by Hachette Livre. It was released in the Netherlands on April 9, 1987, as De Troetelbeertjes Deel 2: Nieuwe Avonturen Van De Troetelbeertjes. The film is also known as Gli orsetti del cuore II in Italy, and Krambjörnarna: på nya äventyr in Sweden.

The Warner-Columbia branch in West Germany released it under the title Glücks-Bärchis, Teil 2—Jetzt im Abenteuerland (Care Bears lucky, Part 2 Now in Adventureland) on December 11, 1986. It sold 174,550 tickets and ranked 84th place among the year's releases in that market (excluding re-issues), grossing approximately €665,000 (the equivalent of DM1,300,000, or US$824,000). (Note: In 1986, the average price of a movie ticket in Germany was equivalent to €3.81.) By comparison, Filmwelt's release of the first film that same year placed 47th with 538,487 tickets. (Note: Filmwelt is abbreviated as "FW" on the InsideKino chart.) On October 13, 1987, RCA/Columbia Pictures released the local version of Care Bears Movie II on video.

The film was released in Mexico on December 25, 1986, as Los Ositos Cariñositos II, and on April 3, 1987 in the Philippines. By the early 1990s, it was marketed as Ursinhos Carinhosos II in Brazil. In China, it is known under the title of Baby Love Bears (Chinese: 爱心熊宝宝; pinyin: Àixīn xióng bǎobǎo). In Russia, the movie was distributed under several names, such as Wonder Bears: The New Generation (Russian: Чудо-мишки. Новое поколение), in a more corresponding translation to the original (Russian: Заботливые Мишки 2: Новое поколение) and other. In Japan, the film was released direct to video through the VHS market on November 21, 1990, under the title Little Bears of the Fairy Star (Otogi no hoshi no ko gumatachi (おとぎの星のこぐまたち)). Subtitled and dubbed versions have been released.

== Reception ==
=== Critical response ===
"The second movie just made a mockery of the first. I wasn't impressed with it at all."

— Rob Robinson, a Care Bears memorabilia collector living in Great Britain

The film was lambasted by critics, in part because of their theory that Care Bears Movie II: A New Generation was part of the franchise's marketing scheme at the time of release. This led The New York Times' Vincent Canby to begin his review by proclaiming, "Product merchandising marches on." Another reviewer claimed to have seen almost every collectible within the film's first twenty minutes. The film was produced to serve as the franchise introduction of the Care Bear Cubs and the Care Bear Cousin Cubs, who also had their own line of toys from Kenner. The plushes, measuring 11" in height, consisted of Bedtime Cub, Cheer Cub, Funshine Cub and Share Cub; the line of Care Bear Cousin Cubs included Li'l Bright Heart Raccoon, Li'l Proud Heart Cat and Li'l Swift Heart Rabbit. Kenner announced the introduction of the Cubs in 1985, shortly before the film opened, and showcased them at the American International Toy Fair in February 1986.

In The Motion Picture Guide 1987 Annual, Jay Robert Nash wrote that its title "refers to the new featured characters who, more than coincidentally, have ended up on the toy shelves of stores everywhere." Steve Millburg from the Omaha World-Herald, however, found it misleading and complained that the Cubs "are not 'a new generation' at all". Several critics considered the film a prequel to the original: the Omaha World Herald reviewer; Edward Jones of Virginia's The Free Lance-Star; Charles Solomon of the Los Angeles Times; and Bill Cosford of The Miami Herald. According to Michael H. Price of the Fort Worth Star-Telegram, "Care Bears Movie II is what the film industry calls a 'requel,' (Note: According to film critic Roger Ebert's Movie Glossary, the requel is a "practice common among long-running film series of copying plots of previous films in the series while maintaining those films as part of the series continuity.") tracing the origin of the Care Bear family and relatives of other species."

In his Animated Movie Guide, animation expert Jerry Beck gave Care Bears Movie II a half-star (½) out of four, and offered this consensus:

Unfortunately not many critics cared for the television standard limited animation, bland songs, and blatent [sic] product placement in this film. Strictly for toddlers over age six, [it] tries too hard to cram new characters into the plotline. The characters are obviously introduced to create toy lines. This is the weakest of the Care Bear movies. Avoid at all costs.

John Stanley expressed his views likewise in his 1988 film guide, Revenge of the Creature Features:

[This] inferior sequel [is] rather charmless. This is strictly Saturday Morning at the Cartoons, a blatant commercial for Care Bear toys and related products ... [T]he bulbs are out as far as ideas are concerned.

"Care Bears Movie II is a sort of pre-sequel that, I suspect, requires its audiences to have some prior knowledge of Care Bears," Vincent Canby said in his New York Times review. "Very young kids may love this, but anybody over the age of 4 might find it too spooky." Hal Lipper of the St. Petersburg Times remarked that it "is an enormously engaging cartoon—quite a feat when you consider the saccharine psychobabble passing for dialogue". The Miami Herald's Bill Cosford gave it two and a half stars out of four, the same rating he had applied to its predecessor. Edward Jones commented that "The animation can't compare with the best of Disney. Take a look at Sleeping Beauty [...] and you'll see the difference." Likewise, Italian critic Paolo Mereghetti complained, "[This is an] ugly sequel with awkward animation, and not even the small fry will find it fun."

Charles Solomon said, "The new Care Bears film...is even more sloppily made and hawks its goods even more shamelessly. [...] The film makers seem more concerned with showcasing the toys than providing entertainment; shared profits obviously count for more than shared feelings. If someone started selling 'Hate Bears,' there undoubtedly would be a film about them." Gene Siskel awarded the film zero stars out of four (along with "Thumbs Down" on At the Movies—the Siskel & Ebert TV show having not been introduced yet (Note: The Siskel & Ebert TV show first aired September 13, 1986, but the film debuted in March 1986. (In the U.S. and Canadian domestic market, wide release occurs when a film is playing in 600 or more theatres.))), while Leonard Maltin gave it a "BOMB" rating in his Movie Guide, and added: "Your kids deserve better entertainment than this treacly stuff about the Kingdom of Caring. Prefab animation from the era of toy merchandising tie-ins." The Gale Group publication, VideoHound's Golden Movie Retriever, gave it one bone out of four in its 1992 edition, but revised it to two later on. (Note: The Golden Movie Retriever uses bones as its equivalent of stars. According to the staff's "Bone Ratings" system, a title given one bone demonstrates "Poor use of camera, film, sets, script, actors, and studio vehicles." A title given two bones "May be perfectly delightful for certain tastes. A waste of time for others. Usually uninspired genre flicks.") In 2001, the Los Angeles-based Hastings Bad Cinema Society picked A New Generation as one of The 100 Worst Movies of the 20th Century. "Even suffering through a Barney video would be preferable to sitting through this," said compiler Michael Lancaster. The film itself had also been nominated for Worst Picture back at their 1986 awards.Common Sense Media gave it slightly negative reviews, as the group responses "Young preschoolers may be frightened by this movie, which offers very little in the way of learning.". The group also aged this movie 6+, as the subplot is too dark for the Care Bears.

The film received some positive reviews, however. Writing for The Advocate of Baton Rouge, Louisiana, Norma Dyess Michaud deemed it "a must-see for preschoolers, especially those who are in the throes of the current Care Bear mania". Richard Martin praised the script and climax, along with the performances of the orphan Cubs. "Their pastel, birthday-cake-and-whipped-cream world has never looked sweeter," he stated. The Philadelphia Daily News commented that it was "even better than the first one, which was good".

=== Home media ===
Care Bears Movie II: A New Generation was released on VHS and Betamax by RCA/Columbia Pictures Home Video on August 21, 1986, and debuted in 12th place on Billboard's Top Kid Video Sales chart on September 27 that same year. The film aired during 1987 on the Disney Channel, a premium television station, and was broadcast in later years on CBS, HBO, Showtime and The Movie Channel. It returned on VHS as part of the Columbia TriStar Family Collection on August 13, 1996. Columbia TriStar Home Entertainment premiered it on DVD on April 8, 2003, as the film is digitally remastered with the picture and color enhanced. The only special features in this edition were trailers for several of the company's family-oriented titles. This was the last animated feature to be released by Columbia Pictures until Final Fantasy: The Spirits Within in 2001. As of 2018, there are consequently no plans for this prequel to be reissued on DVD, even a Blu-ray release has yet to occur. However, a widescreen version of this film (unlike the DVD release, which only contains the full screen version), is available to purchase on iTunes, Amazon Prime, and VUDU. The original theatrical trailer can be viewed in the iTunes Store.

== Sequel ==
In 1987, Nelvana followed A New Generation with The Care Bears Adventure in Wonderland. In this third film, the Bears and Cousins travel to Wonderland and save its Princess from a wizard; Alice, a girl from the real world, takes her place. Self-financed by Nelvana and released by Cineplex Odeon Films, it was the last Care Bears movie of the 1980s to go into theatres. It grossed US$2.6 million in the North American market, and US$6 million worldwide by February 1988. The Care Bears would not appear in another feature production until 2004's direct-to-video effort, Care Bears: Journey to Joke-a-lot.

== See also ==
- Canadian films of the 1980s
- List of Nelvana franchises
- List of animated feature-length films
