= Jack Chojnacki =

American businessman

- Born: c. 1941 (age 83–84); Milwaukee, Wisconsin
- Occupation(s): Co-president of Those Characters from Cleveland, AGC's licensing division
- Years active: 1970s–1980s
- Employer: American Greetings
- Known for: Strawberry Shortcake; Care Bears; Holly Hobbie

Jack Chojnacki (Note: The surname's pronunciation has been given variously as "hoy-not-ski", "hoy-nof-ski" and "why-nat-ski".) (born c. 1941) served as the co-president of Those Characters from Cleveland Inc., a division of U.S. greeting card company American Greetings (AGC), in the 1980s. He assisted in the creation of several AGC franchises, including Strawberry Shortcake and the Care Bears.

== Career ==
A native of Milwaukee, Wisconsin, Chojnacki graduated from the city's Marquette University High School in 1958. During the 1970s, he was among the staff of American Greetings, a card company based in Cleveland, Ohio; he licensed the Holly Hobbie character early in his tenure there. Later that decade, he set up the company's licensing branch Those Characters from Cleveland with another AGC employee, Tim Wilson (the creator of the comic strip Ziggy). Its first franchise, Strawberry Shortcake, made its public debut in 1980.

Beginning in the early 1980s, Chojnacki served as co-president of Those Characters from Cleveland along with Wilson, and vice-president of AGC's licensing operations. Starting in February 1981, he assisted in the creation of another American Greetings franchise, the Care Bears. He served as executive producer of 1985's The Care Bears Movie, along with its 1986 prequel A New Generation; he also was a creative consultant for the 1987 follow-up, Adventure in Wonderland. After the Care Bears, Chojnacki helped out with another two AGC properties, Madballs and Popples. In 1989, the Licensing Industry Merchandisers' Association (LIMA) inducted him into the Murray Altchuler Licensing Industry Hall of Fame, as a charter member.
