= The Care Bears Adventure in Wonderland =

1987 animated film by Raymond Jafelice

- Theatrical release poster
- Directed by: Raymond Jafelice
- Written by: Peter Sauder
- Screenplay by: Susan Snooks; John de Klein
- Produced by: Michael Hirsh; Patrick Loubert; Clive A. Smith
- Starring: Bob Dermer; Eva Almos; Dan Hennessey; Jim Henshaw; Marla Lukofsky; Luba Goy; Keith Knight; Tracey Moore; Colin Fox; John Stocker; Don McManus; Elizabeth Hanna; Alan Fawcett; Keith Hampshire; Alyson Court
- Edited by: Evan Landis
- Music by: Patricia Cullen
- Production company: Nelvana Limited
- Distributed by: Cineplex Odeon Films
- Release date: August 7, 1987
- Running time: 75 minutes
- Country: Canada
- Language: English
- Budget: $5 million (Note: In February 1987, the Toronto Star gave a budget range of US$5–7 million for the film.)
- Box office: $6 million

The Care Bears Adventure in Wonderland is a 1987 Canadian animated musical fantasy film and the third theatrically released film in the Care Bears franchise. It was released in the Canada on August 7, 1987, by Cineplex Odeon Films, and is based on Lewis Carroll's Alice stories. The fourth feature film made at Toronto's studio Nelvana Limited, it was directed by staff member Raymond Jafelice and produced by the firm's founders (Michael Hirsh, Patrick Loubert and Clive A. Smith). It stars the voices of Keith Knight, Bob Dermer, Jim Henshaw, Tracey Moore and Elizabeth Hanna. In the film, the Care Bears must rescue the Princess of Wonderland from the Evil Wizard and his assistants, Dim and Dumb. After the White Rabbit shows them her photo, the Bears and Cousins search around the Earth for her before enlisting an unlikely replacement, an ordinary girl named Alice, to save her true look-alike. Venturing into Wonderland, the group encounters a host of strange characters, among them a rapping Cheshire Cat and the Jabberwocky.

Adventure in Wonderland was co-produced and self-financed by Nelvana Limited, after a consortium of American companies helped them with the first two films. Animation was handled by Nelvana Limited and Taiwan's Wang Film Productions. The film featured a musical score by Patricia Cullen along with songs by pop musicians John Sebastian and Natalie Cole. Upon its North American release, the film opened weakly to mixed reviews, and ended up with a $2.6 million gross worldwide. In the years since it opened, the film has received a VHS and DVD release in various countries outside North America.

== Plot ==
In Care-a-lot, the Care Bears are visited by the White Rabbit, the uncle of Swift Heart Rabbit. The White Rabbit gives the Care Bears the task of finding the missing Princess of Heart, who is to be crowned queen in Wonderland, otherwise the villainous Wizard of Wonderland will gain the throne.

Tenderheart, Grumpy, Good Luck, Brave Heart, Lotsa Heart, Swift Heart and the White Rabbit search all over the world for the Princess, but to no avail. Grumpy is pointed to a girl who resembles the Princess, Alice, who believes she is not special. The Care Bears decide that Alice could act as the Princess until the real one is found. The group is separated by the power of the Wizard, forcing Grumpy, Swift Heart and the White Rabbit to use a rabbit hole to reach Wonderland.

In Wonderland, Tenderheart's group gain directions to Heart Palace from Officer Caterpillar. The Wizard sends his minions Dim and Dum (loosely based on Tweedledum and Tweedledee from Alice Through The Looking Glass) to capture Alice using large battle robots, but the Care Bears defeat them with a Care Bear Stare. Grumpy's group reunite with the others as the Cheshire Cat appears, portrayed as a rapper. The Cheshire Cat splits the group of two, directing Tenderheart, Lotsa Heart, Alice and the White Rabbit to Heart Palace, and Brave Heart, Grumpy, Good Luck and Swift Heart to look for the Mad Hatter, who knows where the Princess is. The Wizard captures Alice briefly and explains to her that when he rules he will make Wonderland less insane and more controlled. Alice flees and runs into the Queen of Hearts' throne room, where the Queen accepts Alice as her daughter whilst knowing she is not. Brave Heart's group locate the Mad Hatter who takes them to the lair of the Jabberwocky, where the Princess is. Grumpy rescues the princess, but the Jabberwocky gets a thorn in his foot which is removed by the Care Bears. In gratitude, the Jabberwocky (or "Stan" as he prefers to be called) decides to help them back to Heart Palace.

As the Princess' coronation day arrives, the Wizard decides to expose Alice's identity to the court via the Princess Test, to prove that she is not the princess. Alice climbs a mountain to retrieve some water from a spring, aided secretly by Tenderheart and Lotsa Heart; however, Alice gives the water to an injured unicorn. Angered by this, the Wizard demands that Alice make the flowers in the palace garden bloom magically. The princess secretly steps in and makes the flowers bloom. The Wizard, who had not been anticipating the Princess' return, suddenly exclaims he had her kidnapped, exposing his crime. The Care Bears, Alice, and the Wonderland characters confront the Wizard but the appearance of the Jabberwocky drives the villain insane, and he is arrested. The princess is crowned the new queen, and she helps Alice and the Care Bears return home.

== Cast ==
The cast of the film:

Name	Character
Bob Dermer	Grumpy Bear
Eva Almos	Swift Heart Rabbit
Dan Hennessey	Brave Heart Lion / Dum
Jim Henshaw	Tender Heart Bear
Marla Lukofsky	Good Luck Bear
Luba Goy	Lotsa Heart Elephant
Keith Knight	White Rabbit
Tracey Moore	Alice
Colin Fox	Wizard
John Stocker	Dim / Cheshire Cat
Don McManus	Caterpillar
Elizabeth Hanna	Queen of Wonderland
Alan Fawcett	Flamingo
Keith Hampshire	Mad Hatter / Jabberwocky ("Stan")
Alyson Court	Princess of Wonderland

== Production ==
A third feature film based on American Greetings' Care Bears characters was under development at Toronto's Nelvana studio as early as June 1986, a few months after the release of the second installment, Care Bears Movie II: A New Generation. Nelvana had also begun production of a Care Bears television series set to air on the ABC network in the U.S., and Global in Canada. Whereas the other two were co-financed with U.S. companies, Nelvana raised its own money (US$5 million) for the new instalment, with assistance from Middlefield Entertainment Group. Production of Adventure in Wonderland, Nelvana's fourth animated feature, took place at the Toronto company's facilities; overseas work was handled by Taiwan's Wang Film Productions. Raymond Jafelice, the director, was previously involved in the original Care Bears Movie as a storyboard artist. (Note: Jafelice was credited in The Care Bears Movie with the first name Ray.) Nelvana's founders—Michael Hirsh, Patrick Loubert and Clive A. Smith—were once again producers. Jack Chojnacki, the co-president of American Greetings' licensing division Those Characters from Cleveland, served as a creative consultant on this instalment; for the previous ones, he was an executive producer. In December 1986, Toronto actor Colin Fox recorded his lines for the film at the Nelvana studios.

== Release ==
=== North America ===
Cineplex Odeon Films, the distribution branch of Canadian cinema chain Cineplex Odeon Corporation, acquired the North American rights to The Care Bears Adventure in Wonderland in February 1987. According to the Long Island newspaper Newsday, Cineplex Odeon chairman Garth Drabinsky "shrugged off [this film] as 'a favour to the Canadian producer.'" Tie-ins appeared at department stores as part of the film's promotion; also, costumed Care Bears spread the word at daycare centres, hospitals and parades, and through radio. Universal Pictures was named sub-distributor of the film, which handled the physical release of the animated feature, but the relations are strictly one of the major contracted as subdistributor for the Cineplex Odeon Films. Opening on August 7, 1987, Wonderland only grossed US$2,608,000 in the U.S. and Canadian domestic market, (Note: Approximately US$7.39 million in 2025 dollars.) with US$1,000,000 in rentals; on its opening weekend, it grossed little more than US$1 million in 20th place on 1,094 screens. It was Cineplex Odeon's second-highest-grossing release as a distributor, alongside Sign o' the Times (which made only US$3 million). The film premiered on videocassette in December 1987, thanks to MCA Home Video, and reissued by GoodTimes Home Video in 1996; a U.S. LaserDisc release occurred on May 16, 1991. The film aired on premium cable's Disney Channel in August 1988; in Canada, television rights were held by the Family Channel. Although the first two Care Bears films have received DVD releases, a Region 1 DVD for the third one has yet to be scheduled due to suffering complications from its first sequel, although it did receive a DVD release in Australia.

Adventure in Wonderland only managed to break even with worldwide earnings of US$6,000,000, (Note: Approximately US$17 million in 2025 dollars.) which led Nelvana co-founder Michael Hirsh to say, "It was just one sequel too many." The Bears would return for a television special, Care Bears Nutcracker Suite, which premiered on video and television in December 1988. They would no longer appear in animated features until 2004's Journey to Joke-a-lot. Their next theatrically released film, Oopsy Does It!, was screened in the U.S. in August 2007.

=== Overseas ===
As with the original Care Bears Movie, Adventure in Wonderland made an appearance at 1987's Cannes Film Festival. The film was released in Germany by CineVox through Warner Bros. on November 27, 1987 as Bärchis Abenteuer im Wunderland. It sold 104,478 tickets and ranked 96th place among the year's releases in that market (excluding re-issues), and grossed approximately €403,000 (the equivalent of DM788,750, or US$570,000). (Note: In 1987, the average price of a movie ticket in Germany was equivalent to €3.86.) The film was released on video by VCL/Virgin on March 22, 1988.

Adventure in Wonderland was released in the Netherlands on December 17, 1987, as Troetelbeertjes in Wonderland. Starting in March 1988, it was screened in matinees across the United Kingdom by Virgin Films, as part of an agreement with the local branch of 20th Century Fox. As late as 1992, distribution rights in France were held by NDP, who released it as Les Bisounours au pays des merveilles. In Spain, the film is entitled Los Osos Amorosos en el País de las Maravillas (among Castilian speakers) and Els Óssos Amorosos al país de les meravelles (among Catalan speakers). Elsewhere in Europe, it is known as As Aventuras dos Ursinhos Carinhosos (in Portugal), Krambjörnarna i Underlandet (in Sweden), and Troskliwe Misie w Krainie Czarów (in Poland).

In Australia, the film was released theatrically in December 1988, and on video in July 1989 by Virgin; it was airing on that country's Nine Network by February 1996. South African video rights were held by Ster Kinekor in 1989. On February 23 that same year, it was released in Mexico as Aventuras de Alicia en el país de las maravillas y los ositos cariñositos. As of 2010, the film has been sold on DVD in several European countries. The Australian edition treats it as an episode rather than a feature-length film.

== Reception ==
"It's always been hard to care for these bears. These adventures do not change them for the better."

— International Film Guide, 1989

Like the first Care Bears Movie, Adventure in Wonderland received mixed reviews from critics. Henry Herx in The Family Guide to Movies and Videos deemed it a "vastly superior sequel" to the "failed original": "[It is] a lively, colourful, complexly designed and orchestrated travelolgue through Wonderland ... Director Raymond Jafelice holds even adult interest with his fast cuts and engaging fantasy characters", while the Bantam Books guide Movies on TV and Video Cassette gave it two and a half stars out of four and called it "Enjoyable [...] for the tyke set." The 1988–1989 edition of the Film Review called it "the best of the trio", adding that it "may well please the youngsters" with its "non-stop entertainment"; this view was also shared by Carole Kass of the Richmond Times-Dispatch. John Teerds of Brisbane, Australia's Sunday Mail wrote of the film positively, while another Australian critic, Rob Lowing of Sydney's The Sun-Herald, gave it two and a half stars out of four and noted that there was "nothing original here, although that also means nothing to shock". Similarly, the Christian Science Monitor wrote that "The animated action holds few surprises for grown-ups, but the cute characters and fetching designs should enthrall young children."

In her New York Times review, Caryn James said, "[The] movie is paced so it won't strain the attention span of a 6-month-old, but there is nothing to spark a child's imagination." As noted Hal Hinson of The Washington Post, "Watching [this movie] is like being pelted mercilessly for 75 minutes with Lucky Charms. It's nonfatal (unless you have a sugar problem, in which case you're likely to lapse into a coma), but it's not exactly my idea of fun either." Rick Groen of Toronto's The Globe and Mail expressed disappointment over the way the villain was handled.

Comparing this installment to its predecessors, Newsday's Joseph Gemlis declared that Wonderland "aspires to be more than a merchandising gimmick. It has a story to tell". However, he criticized the plot and treatment of the fictional land's denizens. Film critic Leonard Maltin called it a "typically bland kiddie outing", awarding it two stars out of four. Halliwell's Film Guide called it "Undemanding and uninteresting whimsy for the under-sixes", while London's Time Out referred to it as "Hemlock to Lewis Carroll fans." In a 1988 issue, the Video Librarian labelled it a "dud".

Adventure in Wonderland was nominated for Best Music Score (by Patricia Cullen) and Best Original Song ("Rise and Shine" by Maribeth Soloman) at the 1987 Genie Awards in Canada. At the Young Artist Awards, it was also nominated for Best Motion Picture in the Animated category.

== Allusions ==
The film is based on Lewis Carroll's Alice's Adventures in Wonderland and its sequel, Through the Looking-Glass. "Basically", said Michael Hirsh, "we borrowed from [these two works] because we thought it would be interesting for the Care Bears to go into a classic adventure and get involved with classic characters." Likewise, Patrick Loubert said, "By combining Alice and those wonderful Lewis Carroll characters from Wonderland with the Care Bears, the new film will now introduce all these magnificent characters to a whole new generation." Parts of this film are inspired by the literary works The Prisoner of Zenda and Androcles and the Lion, and their cinematic counterparts from 1937 and 1952 respectively. According to Johanna Steinmetz of the Chicago Tribune, Wonderland borrowed some elements from The Wizard of Oz.

== Music ==
"First we hear the song 'Everything Is Wonderful in Wonderland.' That contrasts with the villain's song, when he tells how he's going to bring 'order' to Wonderland by taking the color out and turning everything right side up. I don't think he is really scary. Just mean."

— Michael Hirsh

The songs in The Care Bears Adventure in Wonderland were composed and performed by John Sebastian, who performed "Nobody Cares like a Bear" in the first Care Bears Movie. For this instalment, Sebastian sang "Have You Seen This Girl?" and the "Wonderland" song, while singer and songwriter Natalie Cole performed the film's opening song, "Rise and Shine". The score was written by Patricia Cullen (who had previously scored the first two films), and orchestrated and conducted by Milton Barnes. Todd Sussman of The Miami News said, "A musical score of seven forgettable songs is ornamental and does little to advance the plot. Even the opening number is unmemorable. It's hookless, and it never fails to surprise."

Song	Writer	Performer(s)	Producer(s)
"Rise and Shine"	Maribeth Solomon; Arr. Micky Erbe	Natalie Cole	David Greene
"Have You Seen This Girl?"	John Sebastian	John Sebastian	John Sebastian; David Greene
"Wonderland"	John Sebastian	John Sebastian	John Sebastian; David Greene
"Mad About Hats"	John Sebastian	Keith Hampshire	John Sebastian; David Greene
"The King of Wonderland"	John Sebastian	Colin Fox	John Sebastian; David Greene
