= Carol Parks =

American singer and composer (1949-2010)

- Birth name: Carol Celeste Carmichael
- Born: November 30, 1949; Pasadena, California, U.S.
- Died: October 21, 2010 (aged 60); Valley Village, California, U.S.
- Occupation(s): Singer, composer
- Instrument: Vocals

Carol Celeste Parks (born Carol Celeste Carmichael; November 30, 1949 – October 21, 2010) was an American singer and composer.

== Early life ==
Parks was born in Pasadena, California, daughter of contemporary Christian music composer, conductor and arranger Ralph Carmichael.

As a teenager, Parks was a member of the Jimmy Joyce Children's Choir, performing with Art Linkletter (Kids Say the Darndest Things), Ann-Margret and Johnny Green.

== Career ==
=== Vocalist ===
Parks was a Hollywood studio singer in the 1970s and worked with Andy Williams and Tom Jones in shows and was in the choir for Sonny & Cher, Cher, and Danny Kaye.

She was featured as backing vocalist on several popular songs of the 1970s including "Desiderata", "It Never Rains in Southern California", "Undercover Angel", "Rock Me Gently", "The Goodbye Girl", "Little Green Apples", "Train of Thought", "The Night the Lights Went Out in Georgia" and "Delta Dawn". During the mid-70s, she joined up with David Gates, founder member of the band Bread, and became his backing singer for a number of his solo tours, alongside her future husband. Together, they also supported the reunited Bread during their 1978 tour of the UK, although the 1978 UK TV special featured Parks singing from off stage.

She sang on several commercials for Ernest and Julio Gallo, AVCO Financial Services Corporation, Bank of America, Toyota, Datsun and other clients.

Under the aliases "Honey White and the Night Man,” "Kim Carmichael," and "Carol Carmichael,” she recorded two albums Songs My Father Taught Me, The Carol Carmichael Songbook, and two singles, "All Night's Alright", "Shake A Hand". She also recorded two albums Chitty Chitty Bang Bang and Touring The Motor City, plus a single "Summertime Love" with The New Christy Minstrels. Additionally, Parks sang main titles for Where's Poppa? (1970), Save the Tiger (1973), Teenager (1974), Lifeguard (1976), and the television show Ironside, as well as all of the songs from The Care Bears Movie II: A New Generation. She also sang for some of the Christian albums produced by her father.

Parks recorded "The Persuader" on the first automated recording console invented by George Massenburg at The Complex in the early eighties.

=== Assistant record producer ===
She also worked as an assistant producer of records for several pop music groups of the era including Rita Jean Bodine and Hodges, James and Smith in the 1970s, New Monkees in the eighties and associate produced for Donald Fagen, Walter Becker and Rickie Lee Jones in the nineties. She contracted recordings for Kenny Rogers, Dolly Parton, Johnny Rivers, Lambert & Potter, Michael Omartian, Marty Paich, Melanie, Lee Greenwood, Helen Reddy, Alan O'Day, Andy Kim, Albert Hammond, David Gates, Johnny Mathis, Vicki Carr, Billy Joel, and many others.

Along with her former husband Dean Parks, she co-wrote and sang the score for Care Bears Movie II: A New Generation. Her children, Amanda and Acacia Parks, also sang on several tracks.

=== Artist ===
Parks conducted workshops for art teachers such as Sabrina Ward Harrison and SARK.

== Personal life ==
Parks was married to musician Dean Parks. She lived and worked in Southern California's NoHo Arts District until her death in Valley Village, California.
