= Lenora Hume =

Canadian animation Producer, Cinematographer, and Production Executive

- Born: Vancouver, British Columbia
- Education: Havergal College (graduate, 1970); University of Waterloo (graduate, 1974)
- Occupation: Animation crewmember
- Years active: 1976–present
- Employer(s): Nelvana (1976–1990); The Walt Disney Company (1990–2006); Hit Entertainment (2006–2010)

Lenora Hume is a Canadian animation Producer, Cinematographer, and Production Executive who has worked for Nelvana, The Walt Disney Company, and Hit Entertainment.

== Career ==
Hume graduated from Toronto's Havergal College in 1970, and received a Bachelor of Arts degree at the University of Waterloo four years later. In 1976, the Toronto animation company Nelvana hired her as a cinematographer, a position she held for several of its first television specials including The Devil and Daniel Mouse. Hume served as director of photography for its first animated feature, 1983's Rock & Rule. For its next effort, 1985's The Care Bears Movie, she served as supervising producer and worked with Korean and Taiwanese crew.

Lenora also began producing television animation. Ewoks and Droids for Lucasfilm and The Care Bears are amongst her producing credits, which also include the award-winning Babar (1989, Gemini Award for Best Animated Program or Series) and Beetlejuice (1990, Daytime Emmy for Outstanding Animated Program).

By 1990, Hume moved to Walt Disney Television Animation, where she became Director of International Production, overseeing production on all animated shows produced between 1990-2003 featured in The Disney Afternoon syndicated package. In 1995, she was its international vice-president. With a career spanning 16 years, she rose within the organization to become Senior Vice President of Worldwide Production for both Walt Disney Television Animation and DisneyToon Studios. During which time, she oversaw production of shows including TaleSpin, Darkwing Duck, Gargoyles (TV series), Bonkers (TV series), Goof Troop and feature films including DuckTales the Movie: Treasure of the Lost Lamp and A Goofy Movie, as well as its sequel An Extremely Goofy Movie.

In 2006, she left Disney and joined HIT Entertainment as Executive Vice President of Production & Programming and was tasked with preparing the production side of the private equity owned company for a sale. While at HiT, Lenora refreshed some of the most successful pre-school properties in the world, including: Thomas the Tank Engine, Bob the Builder, Barney the Dinosaur, Angelina Ballerina, and Fireman Sam. Additionally, during her tenure, her team developed a robust slate of new properties including Mike the Knight, HiT’s first new property to move into production since Bob the Builder.

Having completed her assignment at HiT, Lenora re-settled in California and launched an independent production and consulting company in the media sector. Her current roster of clients include TeamTO, one of the leading animation studios in Paris, France and Alloy Digital, where she is producing the content for Shut Up! Cartoons one of the new funded channels on YouTube.

== Personal life ==
Hume lives in the greater Los Angeles area; her son is a graduate of the Tisch School of the Arts at New York University.
