= Take Me Up to the Ball Game =

1980 television film

- Screenplay by: Ken Sobol
- Directed by: Ken Stephenson
- Starring: Phil Silvers; Anna Bourque; Melleny Brown; Bobby Dermer; Don Ferguson; Maurice LaMarche; Derek McGarth; Paul Soles
- Country of origin: Canada
- Original language: English

Production
- Producers: Michael Hirsh; Patrick Loubert
- Production company: Nelvana

Original release
- Release: September 18, 1980

Related
- Easter Fever (1980)

Take Me Up to the Ball Game is a 1980 Canadian animated television special that premiered on CBC in Canada and in syndication in the United States on September 18, 1980. It is the last television special in Nelvana's 1977 to 1980 series of specials. It was also the last Nelvana television special to be distributed by Viacom Enterprises in the United States. The title is a play on the 1908 song title "Take Me Out to the Ball Game".

== Plot ==
A children's baseball team (consisting of anthropomorphic animals) encounters a talent scout from outer space named Irwin (voiced by Phil Silvers), who offers them the chance to play against a team from another planet. They later discover that they are playing in a championship game, and that the opposing team has never been defeated because making up one's own rules — which Earthlings call "cheating" — is a common practice in interplanetary baseball.

During the first few innings, the Earth team (no doubt hamstrung by the fact that there are only seven of them) is not doing well against their opponents, and some of the players suggest that they should cheat as well; the team's leader, however, insists that it would be wrong because "cheaters never prosper" (an assertion that provokes laughter from the entire stadium).

The Earth players start anticipating their opponents' tricks and countering them without breaking the rules; the spectators are thrilled by this unexpected turn of events, and the home team actually enjoys having a genuine challenge to face despite the fact that the Earthlings are now winning. Irwin, who had bet heavily against the Earth team, tries to put the odds back in his favor by entering the game himself, but it is no use; the Earthlings win the game.

== Voice cast ==
- Phil Silvers as Irwin
- Anna Bourque as Edna
- Melleny Brown as The Mole (Alex)
- Bobby Dermer as The Beaver (Irwin)
- Don Ferguson as The Commissioner
- Maurice LaMarche as Jake
- Derek McGarth as The Eagle (Leroy)
- Paul Soles as The Announcer

== Songs ==
There are three songs in this special, all sung by Rick Danko of The Band:

1. "Hey Kids", in which Irwin is talking the Earth team into playing against the alien team.
2. "We'll Find a Way", during which the Earth team is being badly beaten by their opponents.
3. "Cheaters Never Prosper", during which the Earth team is making a comeback.

== Availability ==
This special was paired with Easter Fever on the VHS videocassette Nelvanamation Volume 2 (1982); this tape is currently out of print.

Paul Edison and his cousins Ray and Roy are seen watching Take Me Up To The Ballgame in the "Twinners" episode of The Edison Twins (which Nelvana also produced).
