= Greg Salata =

American actor (born 1949)

- Born: Gregory Salata; July 21, 1949 (age 75); New York City, New York, U.S.
- Occupation: Actor
- Years active: 1975–2006

Gregory Salata (born July 21, 1949) is an American actor who first came to prominence in the 1975 film Deadly Hero. He is an actor, known for Weekend at Bernie's, The Pink Panther and Rock & Rule.

== Filmography ==
Year	Title	Role	Notes
1975	Deadly Hero	N/A	
1982	Girls Nite Out	Hagen	
1983	Rock & Rule	Omar	Voice role
1983	Ryan's Hope	Stanley Bosworth	TV series; 2 episodes
1984-1988	Kate & Allie	Ted Bartelo	TV series; 13 episodes
1986	Rockabye	Cab Driver #2	Television film
1986	Comedy Factory	Tom	TV series; episode "Hearts of Steel"
1986	Spenser: For Hire	Frank Scanlon	TV series; episode "Home Is the Hero"
1987	Leg Work	Eddie Randazzo	TV series; episode "The Best Couple I Know"
1989	Mother's Day	N/A	Television film
1989	Weekend at Bernie's	Marty, Vito's Assistant	
1991	Teenage Mutant Ninja Turtles II: The Secret of the Ooze	Promoter	
1991	Dear John	Mitch	TV series; 4 episodes
1994	NYPD Blue	Medical Examiner	TV series; episode "Rockin' Robin"
1997	The Devil's Own	Tony	
2001	Law & Order	Lieutenant Braschi	TV series; episode "Judge Dread"
2003	Little Kings	Uncle Mike	
2003	Manhunt	Hoods	Video game
2006	The Pink Panther	Security Chief	
