= Melleny Melody =

Canadian actress

- Born: Melleny Brown; May 12, 1953 (age 73); Toronto, Ontario, Canada
- Other name: Melleney Brown
- Occupations: Actress; singer; DJ
- Years active: 1978–present
- Spouse: Clive A. Smith (m. 1995)
- Children: 1
- Awards: Juno Award (nominated 2008)
- Website: melleefresh.com

Melleny Melody (born Melleny Brown; May 12, 1953), also known as Melleefresh, is a Canadian actress and singer.

== Biography ==
Melleny Brown was born in Toronto, Ontario. Originally known for her vocal work in cartoons, she played Cheer Bear and Baby Tugs in DIC Entertainment and Nelvana's animated Care Bears franchise. During the 1980s, she starred as female villains in Inspector Gadget, and Star Wars: Ewoks. She also appeared in Nelvana's first feature film, Rock & Rule, in 1983.

During the 1990s, Brown legally changed her name to Melleny Melody and became active in the dance music scene, first in live performances in Toronto and then as a recording artist. Though her legal name remains Melleny Melody, she now records under the Melleefresh moniker. She is also the president of the label Play Records, which produces and releases electronic dance music. In 2008, Melleefresh was nominated for a Juno Award for her collaboration with deadmau5, entitled "Afterhours".

Melleny Melody has also developed several film and video production projects with her husband Clive A. Smith under the banner Musta Costa Fortune, including music videos for Play Records' artists.

== As Melleny Melody and Melleefresh ==
At home in Toronto, she first came to the attention of the pop art scene with her use of everyday items as decoration and her pink "Princessmobile", a Volkswagen adorned with everything from plastic baby dolls and trophies to boa-trimmed seat covers. She also became a much sought-after baker of "art cakes".

Breaking into the music industry as Melleny Melody in the 1990s, she opened the Bubbalicious Lounge in Toronto, where she would dress up in vibrant costumes and wigs to produce and host a rowdy show of ribald classics and new renditions on old themes. Using her knowledge of the dance, disco and deep house music culture, she then founded Gay Records, a label devoted solely to down ‘n’ dirty and kitschy music. She also teamed with DJ Peace Harvest to form Play Records, a North American house music label where she has been President of Play Records since 2001 when DJ Peace Harvest left to pursue other interests.

Since 2005, she has performed under the moniker Melleefresh as a vocal artist in dance music. She has worked with a number of electronic dance music producers, including deadmau5, Billy Newton-Davis, and many other producers around the world.

When working with deadmau5 as "melleefresh", she has provided main vocals for several notable tracks, such as "Hey Baby", "Sex Slave", "Attention Whore", and "Afterhours". In 2008, they were nominated for a Juno Award for their single "Afterhours" in the Dance Recording of the Year category.

In 2010, she began working closely with Southern California producers SpekrFreks. Additionally, she branched out into mixing dance music albums.

== Discography ==
The discography consists of singles, collaborations with various producers and DJs, and compilation albums featuring various remixes of her songs as well as compilation albums she mixed.

=== Singles ===
==== As Melleefresh ====
- 2006: "Beautiful, Rich, and Horny" (with Dirty 30)
- 2006: "Hey Baby" (with deadmau5 as Melleefresh)
- 2006: "Cocktail Queen" (with deadmau5 as Melleefresh)
- 2007: "Afterhours" (with deadmau5 as Melleefresh)
- 2007: "Something Inside Me" (with deadmau5 as Melleefresh)
- 2007: "Sex Slave" (with deadmau5 as Melleefresh)
- 2007: "Whispers" (with deadmau5 as Melleefresh)
- 2007: "Dancin Girl" (with Nino Anthony and disKo loKO)
- 2007: "Let's Get Dirty" (with Stereo Scum)
- 2008: "The Money" (with Scandalis and Dirty 30)
- 2008: "Beautiful, Rich, and Horny" (with Dirty 30 and deadmau5)
- 2008: "How Dangerous" (with Stereo Scum)
- 2008: "Fukchat" (with Billy Newton-Davis and Cajjmere Wray)
- 2008: "Do You Want It" (with J-Break and Wutam)
- 2008: "Attention Whore" (with deadmau5 as Melleefresh)
- 2008: "DJ Boy" (with DJ Zya)
- 2008: "Something Inside Me – Deep Inside" (with deadmau5 and Sage)
- 2008: "Take My Clothes Off" (with Soundsreal and Dirty Machine)
- 2009: "White, Trashy, & Blonde" (with CyberSutra)
- 2009: "Kisses" (with Tyler Michaud and Christopher Manik)
- 2009: "Depo"" (with DJ Zya)
- 2009: "Iron" (with Thomas Sagstad)
- 2009: "Sleazy Bitch" (with HouseAmigo DJs and Per QX)
- 2010: "Juicy" (with Cajjmere Wray)
- 2010: "Back It Up (Melleefresh Vs. Jerome Robins Velvet Fog Mix)" (with Jerome Robins, Billy Newton-Davis, and SpekrFreks)
- 2010: "Sleezee" (with Keoki, Decoding Jesus and David Christopher)
- 2010: "Disco DJ" (with Paul Anthony and ZXX)
- 2010: "Jingle Bellz"
- 2010: "Candy" (with Billy Newton-Davis and SpekrFreks)
- 2013: "Peekaboo" (with Jay Frog)
- 2016: "Courage"
- 2017: "Disco Bunnee"
- 2018: "Candy Cane"
- 2018: "White Horse" (with Jerome Robins)
- 2019: "Pussy" (with DJ Kez and Karol N)

=== Compilations and collaborative albums ===
==== As Melleny Melody ====
- 1994: "Car Toons: Songs to drive You Crazy" with John Henry Nijenhuis

==== As Melleefresh ====
- 2007: "Hey Baby Remixes" with deadmau5, Burufunk, Noir, The House Moguls, and Adam K
- 2007: "Dancin Girl Remixes" with Nino Anthony, Dominatorz, Kid Dub, Kaysh, Ale Avila, and Paul Bingham
- 2007: "Kisses Remixes" with Nosmo, Kris B, Tyler Michaud, Ale Avila Christopher Manik, Discrete Minds, The Hitmen, Kid Dub, and Kaysh
- 2008: "The Money Remixes" with Kid Dub, Dirty 30, Rod Debyser, Dextress, Scandalis, DJ Zya, Neon Stereo, Kaysh and deadmau5
- 2008: "Attention Whore Remixes" with deadmau5, Zoltan Kontes, Jerome Robins, Kaysh, Soundsreal, Ice, Phil Chanel, and DJ Zya)
- 2009: "deadmau5 at Play" with deadmau5, Adam K, and BSOD
- 2009: "Dirt Hott" (Play Digital) (with Spydabrown)
- 2009: "Attention Whore Melleefresh Vs. 10 Djs" (Play Digital)
- 2009: "White, Trashy, & Blonde" (with CyberSutra, Danny Jay, Phat Elvis, OK Sure, Dylan Holshausen, Smut Pushers, Tek Freaks)
- 2009: "Sex Slave – Melleefresh Vs. 13 Djs" (Play Digital)
- 2009: "deadmau5 at Play Volume 2" with deadmau5, Billy Newton-Davis, and BSOD
- 2010: "Candy" (with Per Hammer, Zoltan Kontes, Jerome Robins, Billy Newton-Davis, and SpekrFreks)
- 2010: "deadmau5 at Play Volume 2 DJ MIX" with deadmau5 and Billy Newton-Davis
- 2010: "deadmau5 at Play DJ MIX" with deadmau5
- 2010: "deadmau5 at Play Volume 3" with deadmau5
- 2010: "Best Of Electro Volume 1" (tracks selected & mixed by Melleefresh)
- 2010: "Sleezee" with Keoki, SoundSex, Dirtyloud, Superstrobe, Carlos Barbosa, Decoding Jesus, Jerome Robins, Mateo Murphy, SpekrFreks, and David Christopher)
- 2010: "The Album" (Track: "Disco DJ" with Paul Anthony and ZXX)
- 2010: "Best Of Progressive Volume 1" (tracks selected & mixed by Melleefresh)
- 2010: "Sleezee" [Lets Beat Milo Records] (with Blunt Headed, The Speaker Tweakerz, Keoki, Astro Dudes, SoundSex, Dirtyloud, Brian S, Superstrobe, Carlos Barbosa, Decoding Jesus, Alternate Reality, Jerome Robins, SpekrFreks, and David Christopher)
- 2010: "Mix-Mas 2010" (tracks selected & mixed by Melleefresh)
- 2011: "Dirt Hott Vol. 2" (Tracks: "Candy" with Billy Newton-Davis and SpekrFreks, "Attention Whore – Zoltan Kontes & Jerome Robins" with deadmau5, Zoltan Kontes, and Jerome Robins, mixed by Spydabrown)
- 2011: "Valentine Beatz" (with SpekrFreks)
- 2011: "Mellefresh vs deadmau5 at Play" with deadmau5
- 2017: "Breathless" with Boy Pussy
- 2017: "Work My Body" with Boy Pussy
- 2019: "Melleefresh At Play, Vol 1" (tracks selected & sung by Melleefresh)

=== Music videos ===
==== As Melleny Melody ====
- 1994: "I'm So Happy" (with John Henry Nijenhuis)

==== As Melleefresh ====
- 2009: "Afterhours" (with deadmau5)
- 2009: "Attention Whore" (with deadmau5)

=== Soundtrack ===
As Melleny Brown

- 1983: Rock & Rule – "Hot Dogs and Sushi" (writer and singer)

== Filmography ==
All credits to Melleny Brown, except where otherwise stated.

- Sketches of a Strangler (1978) – Nude Model
- Easter Fever (1980) – Scrawny Chicken
- Take Me Up to the Ball Game (1980) – Mole
- B.C.: A Special Christmas (1981) – The Cute Chick
- The Edison Twins (1982) – Gina (1 episode)
- Strawberry Shortcake: Housewarming Surprise (1983) – Lime Chiffon
- Rock & Rule (1983) – Dementia the Carnegie Hall Groupie
- Inspector Gadget (1983) – Various characters
- Strawberry Shortcake Meets the Berrykins (1984) – Banana Twirl, Bananakin
- Strawberry Shortcake and the Baby Without a Name (1984) – Lemon Meringue, Lime Chiffon
- Unfinished Business (1984) – Larissa, Larry
- The Care Bears Movie (1985) – Cheer Bear, Baby Tugs Bear
- Care Bears (1985) – Cheer Bear
- Ewoks (1985) – Lady Urgah Gorneesh
- Care Bears Movie II: A New Generation (1986) – Cheer Bear
- The Great Heep (1986) – Darva
- The Care Bears Family (1986–1988) – Cheer Bear, Baby Tugs Bear
- Stickin' Around (1996) – Ms. Mobley (as Melleny Melody)
- Inspector Gadget: Gadget's Greatest Gadgets (1999) – Vespella (segment: Prince of the Gypsies)
