= Peter Sauder =

Canadian screenwriter

Peter Sauder is a Canadian film and TV writer, television producer and animator best known for his contributions to Nelvana franchises such as Care Bears (whose three movies he wrote), Babar, Strawberry Shortcake and Star Wars: Droids. Peter, who is originally from Toronto, wrote the first ever story for another hit Nelvana series, Franklin. He is sometimes credited as Pete Sauder.

Sauder also served as head writer for the first season (1983–84) of DiC's Inspector Gadget (the first season was co-produced with Nelvana), as well as Disney Channel/CBC's live-action series The Edison Twins. In the late 1990s, he was story editor for the animated television programs Rolie Polie Olie and Donkey Kong Country.

Sauder started his career working as animator on A Cosmic Christmas, Romie-0 and Julie-8, Intergalactic Thanksgiving and Easter Fever.

Among his later projects are Lunar Jim, The Doodlebops, The Cat in the Hat Knows a Lot About That! and Doki.

== Screenwriting credits ==
=== Television ===
- Inspector Gadget (1983) (series head writer)
- The Get Along Gang (1984)
- The Edison Twins (1984)
- Star Wars: Droids (1985–1986) (series head writer)
- The Care Bears Family (1986–1987)
- My Pet Monster (1987) (series head writer)
- Beetlejuice (1989)
- Babar (1989–1991)
- Little Rosey (1990)
- Rupert (1991–1992)
- Dog City (1992–1994) (series head writer)
- Tales from the Cryptkeeper (1993–1994, 1999) (series head writer)
- The Neverending Story (1995) (series head writer)
- Blazing Dragons (1996) (series head writer)
- Donkey Kong Country (1997) (series head writer)
- Franklin (1997, 2002)
- Rolie Polie Olie (1998)
- George Shrinks (2000)
- Zeroman (2004)
- The Doodlebops (2007)
- Busytown Mysteries (2007–2010)
- Best Ed (2009)
- The Cat in the Hat Knows a Lot About That! (2010)
- Kid vs. Kat (2010)
- Justin Time (2011)
- Doki (2013, 2015)

=== Film ===
- Strawberry Shortcake: Housewarming Surprise (1983)
- Rock & Rule (1983)
- Strawberry Shortcake and the Baby Without a Name (1984)
- The Care Bears Battle the Freeze Machine (1984)
- The Care Bears Movie (1985)
- Strawberry Shortcake Meets the Berrykins (1985)
- Care Bears Movie II: A New Generation (1986)
- The Care Bears Adventure in Wonderland (1987)
- Babar: The Movie (1989)
- Babar: King of the Elephants (1999)
