= Carole MacGillvray =

- Born: Carole Ann Bienkowski; 1937 (age 87–88); Boston, Massachusetts, U.S.
- Years active: Late 1970s–mid-1990s
- Employers: Hasbro (late 1970s); General Mills (1980s); Kenner-Parker Toys (1980s)

Carole MacGillvray Rappeport was an employee of the General Mills Toy Group. As early as 1978, she was associate vice-president of Hasbro's toy marketing unit; in the early 1980s, she served as vice-president of U.S. marketing at General Mills' CPG (Consumer Products Group) division. In February 1984, she became president of General Mills' M.A.D. (Marketing and Design) service, replacing Bernard Loomis. In the mid-1990s, she ran a toy consulting company in Santa Barbara, California.

MacGillvray was a boss to fellow General Mills/Kenner staffer Paul Pressler. Both were executive producers for 1985's The Care Bears Movie, produced by Canada's Nelvana studio. Before its completion, MacGillvray's search for a distributor led to rejections from major U.S. studios; The Samuel Goldwyn Company, an independent outfit, eventually acquired the film for U.S. release.

== Personal life ==
MacGillvray was born Carole Ann Bienkowski in Boston in 1937 to Adam and Eleanor Bienkowski.

In 1961, she married Edward A. Locklin.
