= Rock & Rule =

- Theatrical release poster
- Directed by: Clive A. Smith
- Screenplay by: Peter Sauder; John Halfpenny
- Story by: Patrick Loubert; Peter Sauder
- Produced by: Patrick Loubert; Michael Hirsh
- Starring: Don Francks; Susan Roman; Paul Le Mat; Catherine O'Hara
- Cinematography: Lenora Hume
- Edited by: G. Scott LaBarge
- Music by: Patricia Cullen
- Production companies: Nelvana Limited; Famous Players
- Distributed by: United Artists (through MGM/UA Entertainment Co.)
- Release dates: April 12, 1983 (United States); August 12, 1983 (Canada)
- Running time: 77 minutes (American release); 82 minutes (Canadian release)
- Country: Canada
- Languages: English; French
- Budget: $8 million
- Box office: $30,379 (US)

Rock & Rule (known as Ring of Power outside North America) is a 1983 Canadian adult animated musical science fantasy film featuring the voices of Don Francks, Greg Salata, and Susan Roman. It was produced by Michael Hirsh and Patrick Loubert and directed by Clive A. Smith from a screenplay by John Halfpenny and Peter Sauder.

Centering upon rock and roll music, Rock & Rule includes songs by Cheap Trick, Debbie Harry, Lou Reed, Iggy Pop, and Earth, Wind & Fire. It takes place in a post-apocalyptic United States populated by animalistic humans. The film was a commercial failure due in large part to its extremely small limited theatrical release by distributor MGM/UA, grossing $30,379 on an $8 million budget. Nonetheless, Rock & Rule has developed a cult following, with public knowledge of the film boosted by the Internet.

== Plot ==
Mok Swagger, a legendary rock musician, is on the search for a special voice whose frequencies can unleash a powerful demon from another dimension, his dwindling popularity driving him to destroy the world in vengeance and immortalize himself in the process. Returning to his hometown of Ohmtown, he discovers Angel, a young musician performing with her rock band at a local nightclub. Convinced Angel has the voice he needs, Mok invites the band to his mansion where he kidnaps her and takes her to Nuke York, where his summoning, disguised as a concert, will be performed.

Angel overhears Mok confirming his plans with his computer. At this time, the computer informs Mok that the only way to stop the demon is with "One voice, one heart, one song", but when Mok asks who can do this, the computer replies that there is "no one". Angel tries to escape while her band races to rescue her. After several failed attempts, Mok relocates the summoning to Ohmtown, whose power plant has enough energy for the invocation. Mok forces Angel to sing and open a portal to the demon's dimension. A massive demonic entity emerges from the portal and begins wreaking havoc on all those present.

Omar, Angel's bandmate and love interest, frees Angel from her electronic shackles before the demon can turn on her. Angel tries singing to banish the demon, but her lone voice only pushes him back. Omar then joins in harmony with Angel, and thus the creature is weakened, injured and driven back into its own dimension. Mok is thrown into the portal by one of his minions in vengeance for his brother having died by the demon, while saving Omar. As Mok falls, he realizes that "no one" did not mean that the demon could not be stopped; it meant instead that "no one voice" could, acting alone; two voices and two hearts singing as one were needed for the counter-spell. Mok then plunges into the portal's depths as it seals itself shut. The duo continues their song in triumph as the band is announced as the new super rock band sensation.

== Cast ==
- Don Francks as Mok Swagger
  - Lou Reed as Mok's singing voice in "My Name is Mok" and "Triumph"
  - Iggy Pop as Mok's singing voice in "Pain & Suffering"
- Greg Salata as Omar
  - Paul Le Mat as Omar in the American version
  - Robin Zander as Omar's singing voice
- Susan Roman as Angel
  - Debbie Harry as Angel's singing voice
- Samantha Langevin as Mok's computer
- Dan Hennessey as Dizzy
- Greg Duffell as Stretch and Zip
- Chris Wiggins as Toad and Narrator (uncredited for the latter)
- Brent Titcomb as Sleazy
- Donny Burns as Quadhole and the first radio announcer
- Martin Lavut as Mylar and the second radio announcer
- Catherine Gallant as Cindy
- Keith Hampshire as additional computers
- Melleny Brown as a Carnegie Hall groupie
- Anna Bourque as Edna and a pinball voice
- Nick Nichols as a border guard
- John Halfpenny as Uncle Mikey
- Maurice LaMarche as a sailor
- Catherine O'Hara as Aunt Edith

== Production ==
Rock & Rule was Nelvana's first animated feature film and it was the first Canadian animated feature to be produced in English. The 1971 Canadian film Tiki Tiki and the 1981 Canadian-American co-production Heavy Metal were also produced in English, but Tiki Tiki combined animation with footage from the 1967 Russian live-action film Aybolit-66 while Heavy Metal was an anthology film. Both films were directed by Gerald Potterton. Le Village enchanté, a 1955 production from Quebec, was the country's first overall. The film began production in 1978 as a children's film entitled Drats!. Nelvana used $8 million to finance and produce the film. The premise remained the same, centering on a post-apocalyptic rock band composed of fuzzy mutant creatures who evolved from rats in a world where the human race was wiped out and only the street animals: cats, dogs and rats survived. However, instead of wiring her to the soundboard, Mok transforms Angel into a guitar, and literally plays her to summon the beast. The crew felt that it would be easier to animate cartoony characters but, as the film evolved, they gradually became humans with animalistic features, and Hollywood acquaintances encouraged them to skew the tone towards an older audience.

The film was produced without a well-defined script, so the crew would develop and work on sequences, leaving holes for more layers of the story to be added later.

The cost of production, $8 million in studio resources, nearly put Nelvana out of business. Over 300 Nelvana animators worked on the film. The film went $3 million over budget.

The animation was of unusually high quality for the era, and the special effects were mostly photographic techniques, as computer graphics were in their infancy. Computers were used to generate only a few images in the film, with a computer-controlled multiplane camera system being developed to add depth. One effect was called "controlled streak photography", where glowing effects are made by combining backlit animation with a computer-controlled camera.

== Release ==
Prior to its completion, Rock & Rule was picked up by Hollywood film studio MGM/UA in April 1983. However, they did not care about the animated feature and gave it only an extremely small limited release in theatres on April 15, 1983. Due to some scenes involving adult themes such as sexuality and profanity, the film was uniquely marketed.

The film's lack of release nearly bankrupted Nelvana and it sold half its interest in NAC (Nelvanas Animated Commercials) to keep from bankruptcy. Many of the major animators who worked on it never again came back to the studio. Some would remain for a few more years but most went on to become animators at Disney, DreamWorks, Warner Bros and other well known studios around the world. To recover, the company turned to more commercial fare. Strawberry Shortcake: House Warming Surprise, Herself the Elf, The Get-Along Gang (the half-hour special, not the series which was produced by DIC), and Strawberry Shortcake Meets the Berrykins were half-hour service jobs that were used to fill the gap giving animation staff two months on each to remain financially alive. Nelvana was saved from bankruptcy by a successful film, The Care Bears Movie. A senior animator from Rock and Rule was brought in to do a one-minute Care Bear promo that was sold as a test for American Greetings Cards (the same animator who animated the now famous Nelvana polar bear logo which is now seen at the end of every Nelvana production); it was shown at an AGC meeting and sold the movie. To the shock of the Canadian film community the film went on to become Canada's highest grossing film that year and taking the coveted "Golden Reel" award at the Canadian Genie Awards (It also was nominated for best original song). This spawned the Nelvana Care Bears franchise with television series on the ABC network and two more Care Bear features were to follow. Successful children's series My Pet Monster, Beetlejuice, Mr. Microchip, Babar and DiC's Inspector Gadget, as well as Droids and Ewoks (based on the Star Wars franchise) were to follow. Thus, Nelvana was on its way to becoming one of the most prolific and well-known animation companies in the world.

=== Alternative versions ===
==== American ====
The American distributor, MGM/UA Entertainment Company, disliked Greg Salata, who voiced Omar, and insisted that he would be re-dubbed by an actor with name recognition, along with several edits being made to the film, such as some scenes being shortened, dialogue being redubbed and a slightly different ending. Paul Le Mat was cast and most scenes involving Omar were altered to tone down his obscenities. The prologue was also altered, further muddying the fact that the characters are supposed to be animalistic humans. Released through United Artists in April 1983, the revised film was unable to find an audience at the box office, grossing only $30,379. It was this chopped version that quickly found its way to VHS and LaserDisc.

==== Canadian ====
The American version of the film was initially broadcast on the Canadian Broadcasting Corporation in 1985 (uncut and including parental warnings). In 1988, the Canadian Broadcasting Corporation began airing the original cut, which featured extra footage, a different, clearer audio mix, the original voice of Omar, original shots that had been replaced by alternate footage, and a shot of Zip regaining consciousness at the conclusion.

=== Home media ===
Original home video release copies of Rock & Rule are extremely difficult to find. MGM/UA Home Video released the film on VHS and Betamax in 1984 and on LaserDisc in 1986. Both of these editions soon went out of print. Bootleg copies of the film ended up being sold at comic book conventions, but these copies erroneously listed the film as having been done by Ralph Bakshi. Soon after its demise in the home entertainment market, copies of the film could be acquired only by writing to Nelvana, who charged a fee of $80 to create and send a video copy of the film.

On June 7, 2005, Unearthed Films released the film for the first time on DVD. The first disc includes the theatrical cut and the second disc includes the original cut of the film (though the original print was destroyed in a fire; this was taken from a VHS source) and The Devil and Daniel Mouse, the TV special that was the inspiration for Rock & Rule. Other features were the alternate 'Ring of Power' introduction sequence and a slightly different rough-cut version of the ending. Also included is the trailer for Electric Dragon 80.000 V, a 2001 Japanese film written and directed by Sogo Ishii. On September 28, 2010, a Blu-ray Disc was released by Unearthed Films and has two versions of the film in one disc. Both Unearthed Films releases have since gone out-of-print.

Nelvana uploaded the film to its YouTube channel, Retro Rerun, on November 30, 2019 (which was presented in the American VHS and LaserDisc formats). The upload has since been made private on the website as of April 2022 (which was available on Amazon Prime Video after Amazon's acquisition of MGM Holdings on March 17, 2022, renamed currently known as Amazon MGM Studios).

=== Merchandise ===
Because of MGM's lack of interest in the film, little promotion was given. The film was mentioned in an episode of Night Flight, when Lou Reed was interviewed and incorrectly credited as the speaking voice of Mok. Marvel Comics published a comic book adaptation with authentic pictures from the film and its production in Marvel Super Special #25. According to letterer and assistant editor Michael Higgins, the comic sold well despite the film having a limited release.

== Reception ==
The film received mostly positive reviews. Spin called Rock and Rule "the greatest oddball scifi musical ever committed to animation cels". Critic Janet Maslin of The New York Times commented that "The animation ... has an unfortunate way of endowing the male characters with doggy-looking muzzles. In any case, the mood is dopey and loud." American Film magazine described it as a "nominee for the Instant Midnight Movie Award." Graham Young of the Birmingham Mail said "The antithesis of Disney, and flawed but ahead of its time, Rock & Rule will surprise and delight anyone whose combined interests include graphic novels, animated films and rock music." Mike McPadden of Vice wrote that "it's enjoyable on its own merits and potently nostalgic." Keith Breese of Contact Music described Rock & Rule as "a masterpiece of outré animation and wildly ambitious vision and remains a triumph in animated feature film". The film has since developed a cult following.

== Soundtrack ==
Rock & Rule

Soundtrack album by Various artists
- Released: Unreleased
- Genres: Rock, pop

Songs from Iggy Pop, Lou Reed, Cheap Trick, Debbie Harry, and Earth, Wind & Fire feature on the soundtrack.

Presumably, due to the film's limited release and the fact that the artists were under contract to different record labels, a proper album was never issued, although a promotional cassette was given to the press featuring nine songs from the film. The only songs to be commercially released are three by Cheap Trick, which were issued in their 1996 boxed set Sex, America, Cheap Trick, as well as Earth, Wind and Fire's sole contribution entitled "Dance, Dance, Dance", which was released as a digital single in 2012, and Iggy Pop's "Pain and Suffering", which was included as a bonus track on the 2019 re-release of his 1982 album Zombie Birdhouse (an entirely different recording of the song was included on the album's 1991 reissue). Additionally, Harry revised the lyrics to "Angel's Song" and retitled it "Maybe for Sure", which was featured on her 1989 album Def, Dumb & Blonde.

=== Reception ===
LA Weekly called the soundtrack "a mixed bag of rock songs" with the "standout track" being "Earth, Wind & Fire's funky club jam 'Dance, Dance, Dance'". Keith Breese of Contact Music noted that the soundtrack "certainly feels contemporary", with "Debbie Harry's addictive 'Angel Song' as the highlight".

=== Track listing ===
No.	Title	Artist	Length
1.	"Angel's Song"	Debbie Harry
2.	"Send Love Through"	Debbie Harry
3.	"Send Love Through-Finale"	Debbie Harry & Robin Zander
4.	"Pain & Suffering"	Iggy Pop
5.	"My Name Is Mok"	Lou Reed
6.	"Triumph"	Lou Reed
7.	"Born to Raise Hell"	Cheap Trick
8.	"I'm the Man"	Cheap Trick
9.	"Ohm Sweet Ohm"	Cheap Trick
10.	"Dance Dance Dance"	Earth, Wind & Fire
11.	"Hot Dogs and Sushi"	Melleny Brown

== See also ==
- List of animated feature films
- Power pop
- Heavy Metal, another Canadian animated movie featuring a soundtrack with various rock and metal artists.

== Works cited ==
- Mazurkewich, Karen (1999). Cartoon Capers: The History of Canadian Animators. McArthur & Company Publishing. ISBN 1-55278-093-7.
