= Clive A. Smith =

British director and animator (born 1944)

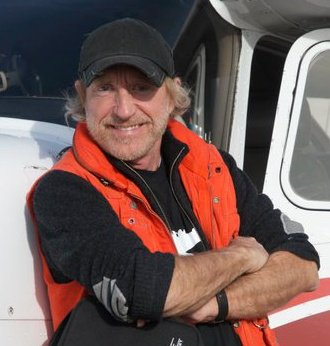
- Born: 1944 (age 81–82); London, England, UK
- Citizenship: United Kingdom; Canada
- Occupations: Film director; animator
- Spouse: Melleny Melody (m. 1995)
- Children: Zachary "Spydabrown" Smith

Clive A. Smith (often credited as Clive Smith) (born 1944) is a British-Canadian director and animator who, along with Michael Hirsh and Patrick Loubert, founded Canadian animation studio Nelvana in 1971.

== Life and career ==
Smith worked on some of his studio's first TV specials, including A Cosmic Christmas (1977), which was broadcast on CBC Television in Canada and syndicated in the United States, proving to be Nelvana's breakthrough production. He also directed the studio's next special, The Devil and Daniel Mouse, in 1978. Additionally, he served as the director of Nelvana's first feature film, 1983's Rock and Rule, as well as its 1997 animated adaptation of the Pippi Longstocking saga. Smith's directing credits also include "A Wookiee's Christmas" (also known as "The Faithful Wookiee") for George Lucas and eight episodes of Family Dog for Tim Burton and Steven Spielberg. Smith retired from Nelvana in 2001, the year after he and his co-founders sold the studio to Corus Entertainment.

Smith was born in London, England, in 1944 and was educated at the Ealing School of Art, where he graduated with a degree in Design and Kinetic Art. In 1964, he joined the Halas and Batchelor animation studio in West London, where he worked on animated series such as The Beatles and The Lone Ranger. In 1967, he moved to Canada and worked as a senior animator and designer on commercials and short films with Al Guest and Vladimir Goetzleman. It was during this time that he met Hirsh and Loubert, and later went on to co-found Nelvana.

Since leaving Nelvana, Smith co-founded Musta Costa Fortune with Melleny Melody.
