= Patrick Loubert =

Canadian film producer

- Born: Toronto, Ontario, Canada
- Occupation: Film producer
- Years active: 1971-present

Patrick Loubert is one of the founders of the Canadian animation studio, Nelvana Limited, along with Clive A. Smith and Michael Hirsh. He has produced, and executive-produced, many of the company's films and television shows.

At the beginning of his career, Loubert published The Great Canadian Comic Books, a 1971 book focusing on the early days of local comic lore, with partner Hirsh. With Don Haig, he scripted and directed 125 Rooms of Comfort, another live-action project, in 1974. He also produced the first season of Inspector Gadget for DIC Entertainment with show's creator Jean Chalopin (The first season was animated and co-produced by Nelvana), Gargoyles: The Goliath Chronicles for Disney and Buena Vista, the adventure game Toonstruck and the American thriller film Malice (starring Alec Baldwin, Nicole Kidman and Bill Pullman) and worked as a storyboard artist and story writer for Nelvana's first feature-length film Rock and Rule and executive story editor for the third Care Bears feature film The Care Bears Adventure in Wonderland. He also created the live-action TV series for Nelvana The Edison Twins and T. and T. (starring Mr. T) with Michael Hirsh and wrote scripts for the company's first two animated specials A Cosmic Christmas and The Devil and Daniel Mouse as well as writing the scripts for Babar: The Movie.

Loubert and his colleagues won an Emmy Award in 1990 (in the category Outstanding Animated Program) for the children's television series Beetlejuice.
