= Charles Bonifacio =

Canadian animator

Charles Bonifacio is a Canadian animator who worked on Nelvana productions such as Rock and Rule, Inspector Gadget, Star Wars: Ewoks, the Care Bears television series and the first two Care Bears movies of the 1980s. He was director of animation on The Care Bears Movie and on Care Bears Movie II: A New Generation. In the 1990s, he worked on FernGully: The Last Rainforest and several Disney animated films.

Bonifacio's other animation credits include A Cosmic Christmas, Watership Down (uncredited), The Devil and Daniel Mouse, Romie-0 and Julie-8, Intergalactic Thanksgiving, Easter Fever, the last three Strawberry Shortcake TV specials, The Land Before Time, All Dogs Go to Heaven, Rock-A-Doodle and Once Upon a Forest. Bonifacio has also worked on Disney's The Hunchback of Notre Dame, Mulan, Lilo & Stitch, Return to Never Land, Tarzan II and Brother Bear 2.

In the late 1980s and 1990s, Charles taught classical animation at Sheridan College. Clive A. Smith, one of Nelvana's founders, recruited Bonifacio from Sheridan College among a host of young animators from that institution, one of the few animation schools in the world at the time.
