= Chris Wiggins =

Canadian actor

- Born: Christopher John Wiggins; January 13, 1931; Blackpool, England
- Died: February 19, 2017 (aged 86); Elora, Ontario, Canada
- Occupation: Actor
- Years active: 1954–2015
- Known for: Friday the 13th: The Series; Swiss Family Robinson
- Spouse(s): Sandra Crysler-Wiggins (m. 19??; died December 14, 2009)
- Awards: Genie Award for Best Actor (Non-Feature)

Christopher John Wiggins (January 13, 1931 – February 19, 2017) was an English-born Canadian actor.

== Career ==
Wiggins was born January 13, 1931, in Blackpool, England. He started out as a banker in his home country before he began his acting career in Canada, where he moved in 1952.

Wiggins is probably best recognized for his role as Jack Marshak, the benevolent, resourceful expert on the occult in the syndicated television horror show Friday the 13th: The Series, and which ran from 1987 to 1990. Another well known role was Johann Robinson (Father) on Swiss Family Robinson.

He won a Canadian Film Award in 1969 for Best Actor in a Non-Feature for his role in The Best Damn Fiddler from Calabogie to Kaladar.

In addition to his television and film work, Wiggins was also a very popular radio actor, making over 1,200 appearances in various series over the years, particularly on CBC Radio. One of his most popular roles was that of Dante, the insufferably brilliant (and insufferably arrogant) computer that ran the Aleph-9: the high-speed interdimensional spacecraft belonging to Johnny Chase: Secret Agent of Space. Wiggins also made numerous guest appearances on such CBC Radio programs as Nightfall, Vanishing Point and dozens of others.

Wiggins also lent his voice to many animated TV series and movies. He was the voice of the villain Mysterio in Spider-Man, Will Scarlet on Rocket Robin Hood, the Great Wishing Star in 1986's Care Bears Movie II: A New Generation, and the villain No Heart on the Nelvana version of Care Bears. He also voiced the character Dimetro in Dinosaucers. His other roles in animated series and films include ALF Tales, Star Wars: Droids, Rock & Rule, Star Wars: Ewoks, Babar, Babar and the Adventures of Badou, Rupert, The Busy World of Richard Scarry, Franklin, and Redwall.

== Death ==
Wiggins was married to Sandra Crysler-Wiggins, who died in 2009, and had no children. He died at a nursing home in Elora, Ontario, on February 19, 2017, from complications of Alzheimer's disease.

== Filmography ==
=== Film ===
Year	Title	Role	Notes
1969	The Best Damn Fiddler from Calabogie to Kaladar	Emery	Genie Award for Best Actor (Non-Feature)
1970	King of the Grizzlies	Colonel Pearson	
1973	The Neptune Factor	Captain Williams	
1977	Welcome to Blood City	Gellor	
1977	Why Shoot the Teacher?	Lyle Bishop	
1978	High-Ballin'	King Caroll	
1978	Two Solitudes	Captain Yardley	
1979	Murder by Decree	Doctor Hardy	
1979	Jigsaw	MacKenzie	
1979	Fish Hawk	Marcus Boggs	
1980	Virus	Dr. Borodinov	
1983	Rock & Rule	Toad (voice)	
1984	The Bay Boy	Charlie McInnes	
1986	Care Bears Movie II: A New Generation	Great Wishing Star (voice)	
1989	Babar: The Movie	Cornelius (voice)	
1991	Married to It	Dave	
1995	Butterbox Babies	Senator Danver	
1995	Voices	Angus Fergusson	
1997	Pippi Longstocking	Fridolf (voice)	
1999	Babar: King of the Elephants	Cornelius (voice)	
2001	Franklin's Magic Christmas	Mr. Collie (voice)	Direct-to-video
2002	The Snowman Who Saved Summer	Santa Claus (voice)	Direct-to-video

=== Television ===
Year	Title	Role	Notes
1954–61	General Motors Theatre	Jonah Grundeen, Sweeney, George, Sgy. Wyeth, Booking Agent	
1957	Hawkeye and the Last of the Mohicans	Mort Bailey, Major Conn, Major Duffy, Mr. Travers, Sheriff Peterson, Jess Adams	6 episodes
1958–59	The Unforeseen	King, Monfort	7 episodes
1959–60	R.C.M.P.	George Needham, Kurt Hummel, Bush Pilot Watt, Martinson	4 episodes
1961	The United States Steel Hour	Charles Blake	2 episodes
1961–64	Playdate	Heinrich, Grandpa, Vanderkemp, Dr. Bahn	5 episodes
1965	The Forest Rangers	Professor Mandell, Porter	2 episodes
1965	Moment of Truth	Dexter	1 episode
1966	The Marvel Super Heroes	Balder, Grey Gargoyle, Thor, additional voices	
1966	Julius Caesar	Cassius	Television film
1967–68	Rocket Robin Hood	Will Scarlet, Infinata, Baron Blank (voice)	6 episodes
1967–70	Spider-Man	Mysterio, Infinata, Harley Clivendon (voice)	8 episodes
1968	Wojeck	Gilbert	3 episodes
1969	Adventures in Rainbow Country	Fred Vincent	Episode: "The Eye of the Needle"
1971–72	Paul Bernard, Psychiatrist	Paul Bernard	Main role
1973	Tom Sawyer	Lawyer	Television film
1974	The National Dream	Donald Smith	4 episodes
1974–76	Swiss Family Robinson	Johann Robinson, Buckley	26 episodes
1977	A Cosmic Christmas	Mayor (voice)	Television special
1978	The Devil and Daniel Mouse	Beelzebub (voice)	Television special
1979	Riel	Middleton	Television film
1979	Intergalactic Thanksgiving	Pa Spademinder (voice)	Television special
1979	An American Christmas Carol	Nathaniel Brewster	Television film
1979–81	The Littlest Hobo	Ed Thompson	2 episodes
1980	The Courage of Kavik the Wolf Dog	Vic Walker	Television film
1980	Jack London's Tales of the Klondike	Finis	1 episode
1980	Easter Fever	Santa Claus (voice)	Television film
1981	Escape from Iran: The Canadian Caper	John Sheardown	Television film
1981	Titans	Galieo	Episode: "Galieo"
1982	Shock Trauma	Dr. McCall	Television film
1982	Mazes and Monsters	King	Television film
1982–86	Hangin' In	Ward, Abe	3 episodes
1983	Strawberry Shortcake: Housewarming Surprise	Mr. Sun (voice)	Television film
1983	Cook & Peary: The Race to the Pole	Roberts	Television film
1983	A Case of Libel	Colonel Douglas	Television film
1984	Strawberry Shortcake and the Baby Without a Name	Mr. Sun, Narrator (voice)	Television film
1985	Faerie Tale Theatre	Alderman	Episode: "The Pied Piper of Hamelin"
1985	Strawberry Shortcake Meets the Berrykins	Mr. Sun (voice)	Television film
1985	Jimmy Valentine	Victor Adams	Television short
1985–86	The Edison Twins	Lafayette, Old Trainer	2 episodes
1985–86	Night Heat	Picard, Maxim Gates	2 episodes
1986	Barnum	Olmstead	Television film
1986	Spearfield's Daughter	Sylvester Spearfield	3 episodes
1986	Adderly	Belkin	Episode: "Mailman"
1986–88	The Care Bears Family	No Heart (voice)	46 episodes
1987	Ford: The Man and the Machine	Malcolmson	Television film
1987	Mariah	Timothy Quinlan	7 episodes
1987	Dinosaucers	Dimetro (voice)	18 episodes
1987–90	Friday the 13th: The Series	Jack Marshak	72 episodes
1989–91	Babar	Cornelius (voice)	65 episodes
1989–94	Keroppi and Friends	Narrator (voice)	
1990	Divided Loyalties	William Johnson	Television film
1990	Maniac Mansion	Santa Claus	Episode: "Good Cheer on Ya"
1990	Counterstrike	Sgt. Luther	Episode: "Art for Art's Sake"
1990–92	Street Legal	Ronald Spencer, Judge Ritter	2 episodes
1991	Counterstrike	Kistler	Episode: "It's All in the Game"
1991	Mark Twain and Me	Captain	Television film
1992	Road to Avonlea	Mr. McCorkadale	Episode: "Aunt Janet Rebels"
1992	A Cry in the Night	Clyde	Television film
1992–93	By Way of the Stars	Captain Harris	6 episodes
1993	Kung Fu: The Legend Continues	Mike West	Episode: "Blind Eye"
1994	RoboCop	Roger Yung	Episode: "Prime Suspect"
1994	Tales from the Cryptkeeper	Slim (voice)	Episode: "The Haunted Mine"
1994	Scales of Justice	Lawyer	Episode: "L'Affaire Belshaw"
1995	Black Fox	Ralph Holtz	Miniseries
1995	Sailor Moon	Narrator, Mr. Baxter (voice)	3 episodes
1995–96	The Neverending Story	Mr. Correander, Thonkas	11 episodes
1995–98	The New Adventures of Sherlock Holmes	Robert Cansington (voice)	
1996	Sins of Silence	Father Flannigan	Television film
1997	Fast Track	Carl Scannel	Episode: "Triangle"
1997	Windsor Protocol	Charles Ferguson	Television film
1997–98	Freaky Stories	Narrator (voice)	3 episodes
1998	Earth: Final Conflict	Tim O'Malley	Episode: "The Secret of Strandhill"
1998	Pippi Longstocking	Fridolf (voice)	2 episodes
1998	Birdz	Officer Pigeon (voice)	Episode: "One Giant Leap"
1998	Evidence of Blood	Horace Talbott	
1998	Thunder Point	Charles Ferguson	Television film
1998–99	Mythic Warriors	Elderly Stablehand, King Proteus, Great Oracle (voice)	2 episodes
1999–2002	Redwall	Abbot Mortimer (voice)	39 episodes
2000–04	Franklin	Mr. Groundhog (voice)	4 episodes
2001–02	Pecola	Pecolius (voice)	12 episodes
2003	The Piano Man's Daughter	James Kilworth	Television film
2005	ReGenesis	Vascily Popov	3 episodes
2005	Our Fathers	Priest	Television film
2006	Four Minutes	Burnett	Television film
2010–11	Babar and the Adventures of Badou	Cornelius (voice)	17 episodes

=== Video games ===
Year	Title	Role	Notes
2011	Warriors: Legends of Troy	Anchises, Theseus	

== Awards and nominations ==
Year	Award	Category	Production	Result
1969	Canadian Film Awards	Best Performance by an Actor (Non-Feature)	The Best Damn Fiddler from Calabogie to Kaladar	Won
