= Easter Fever =

1980 animated TV special

- Also known as: The Jack Rabbit Story
- Screenplay by: Larry Mollin
- Directed by: John Celestri; Greg Duffell; Ken Stephenson
- Starring: Garrett Morris; Maurice LaMarche; Jeri Craden; Don Ferguson; Jim Henshaw; Melleny Brown; Larry Mollin; Catherine O'Hara; Chris Wiggins
- Music by: Patricia Cullen
- Country of origin: Canada
- Original language: English

Production
- Producer: Michael Hirsh
- Running time: 25 minutes
- Production companies: Nelvana Limited; Topcraft Limited Company

Original release
- Release: March 30, 1980

Easter Fever is a 1980 Canadian animated Easter themed television special that premiered in syndication in the United States and on CBC on March 30, 1980.

== Summary ==
In the special, Jack Rabbit (voiced by Saturday Night Live cast member Garrett Morris) leaves his job as the Easter Bunny and is treated to a celebrity roast until an aardvark convinced him not to retire with "the last Easter egg" (Maurice LaMarche providing impressions of Steve Martin and Don Rickles and SCTVs Catherine O'Hara providing the voice of Jack's wife Scarlett O'Hare). It also features songs by John Sebastian of The Lovin' Spoonful.

== Production ==
It is the five out of the six television specials in the 1977 to 1980 series of specials by Nelvana. It was also one of the last television specials from the company, concluding the series with Take Me Up to the Ball Game, which premiered on September 18 of the same year.

== Voice cast ==
- Garrett Morris as Jack Rabbit
- Maurice LaMarche as Don Rattles, Steed Martin, Jack's Dad, Penguin Waiter, Peter Easter Bat, Moose Judge
- Catherine O'Hara as Scarlett O'Hare
- Don Ferguson as Announcer, Drunk Guest, Moose Judge
- Jim Henshaw as Aardvark
- Chris Wiggins as Bull Chef, Santa Claus
- Larry Mollin as Ratso Rat, Beaver
- Jeri Craden as Madame Malegg, Jack's Mom
- Melleny Brown as Scrawny Chicken, Hare-O

== See also ==
- List of Easter television episodes
- The Dean Martin Celebrity Roast
- A Cosmic Christmas
- The Devil and Daniel Mouse
