= A Sweeter Song =

1976 film directed by Allan Eastman

- Theatrical poster
- Directed by: Allan Eastman
- Written by: Jim Henshaw; Allan Eastman
- Produced by: Allan Eastman; John Hunter (line); Sam Jephcott (associate); Anthony Kramreither (executive)
- Starring: Jim Henshaw; Susan Petrie; Susan Hogan; Peter Jobin; Allan Migicovsky; with Linda Huston; Nick Mancuso; David Bolt
- Cinematography: Robert Brooks
- Edited by: William Gray; Allan Eastman
- Music by: Jove
- Production company: Labyrinth-Burg Productions Ltd (Tor)
- Distributed by: Epoh, First American Films, Ambassador (Canada)
- Release dates: 12 January 1976 (U.S.); 11 March 1977 (Canada)
- Running time: 91 minutes
- Country: Canada
- Language: English
- Budget: C$125,000

A Sweeter Song (U.S.: Snap Shot or Snapshot) is a 1976 Canadian comedy film and the first feature film directed by Allan Eastman, who also co-produced and co-wrote the film with star Jim Henshaw.

== Plot ==
Accident-prone sports news photographer Cory (Jim Henshaw) carries a torch for his best friend's wife Linda (Susan Hogan). After Linda discovers her husband dallying with another woman, she leaves him. Cory's hopes appear to be dashed when she moves in, not with Cory, but his gay neighbour. Meanwhile, Cory's free-spirited co-worker from the newspaper Annie (Susan Petrie) has decided that Cory is the one for her. Eventually, after a great many twists and turns, the convoluted series of events resolves itself, and everyone lives happily ever after.

== Cast ==
Main

- Jim Henshaw • Cory
- Susan Petrie • Annie
- Susan Hogan • Linda
- Peter Jobin • David
- Allan Kolman (credited as Allan Migicovsky) • Mark
- Linda Huston • Sybil
- Nick Mancuso • Manuel
- David Bolt • Phipps

Supporting

- Deni Allaire • Ashley
- Lise Granik • Dagmar
- George Kee • councillor
- Terry Lynch • Barlow
- David Main • critic
- Richard Davidson • director
- Doug Fetherling • Lyle
- Dale Wilson • Pretty Boy
- Janelle Hutchison • screamer
- Jankiel Zajfman • designer
- Derek McGrath • intense young man
- Leah Peterson • painted lady
- Don LeGros • fireman
- Ann Lantuch • Angie
- Tony Baretta • Wolinsky

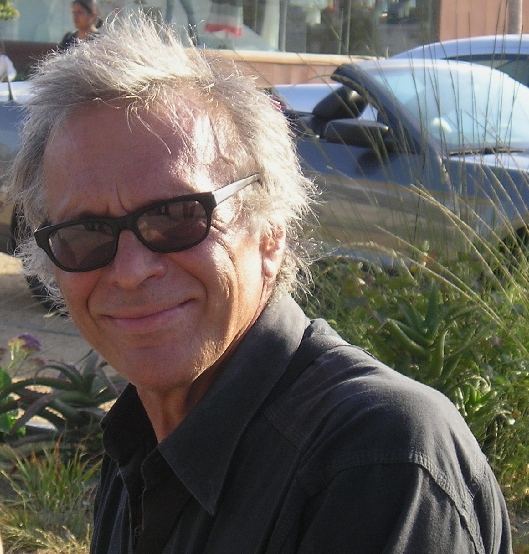
A Sweeter Song was Nick Mancuso's first on screen role.

== Themes and influences ==
Before the film began shooting, Allan Eastman described it as "a comedy of sexual values and identities" and "a study of a Toronto subculture". Stephen Chesley pointed out that this was "one of the few times an audience is presented with an examination of young people's mating habits that is made by young people, rather than someone middle-aged who's trying to remember." Several years after its release, the film was described as a parody of "the great Canadian loser", an "angst-ridden boy drinking himself to death, isolated against the wilderness." The film also incorporated a critique of the Canadian film establishment in the form of a Canadian spoof film-within-a-film.

Fresh from graduating from the University of Bristol Film School in 1975, Eastman was strongly influenced by the French New Wave, not realizing, he said in 1985, that "they'd stolen their best ideas from the great American directors".

== Production ==
=== Background and financing ===
Jim Henshaw wrote the script for A Sweeter Song and reworked it with Eastman, whom he had met on the set of Lions for Breakfast, in which Henshaw co-starred with Eastman's girlfriend, Susan Petrie. Henshaw recalled in 2008 that Eastman, who was bored, asked if Henshaw had anything to read, so Henshaw gave Eastman a script he had written:

At day's end, he wandered back, said he'd liked it and would I be amenable to him directing and Susan assuming the female lead. I said sure and that weekend we talked to "Lions" producer Tony Kramreither and mutual friend John Hunter about producing. They said sure and a year later "A Sweeter Song' was in the can.

Eastman said in 1985 that A Sweeter Song "only got made because I wouldn't take no for an answer." According to him, he was the sole producer at first, through the company he founded, Labyrinth, up to the point when Canadian Film Development Corporation funding had been secured, "at which point John Hunter became Line Producer" and Anthony Kramreither joined as Executive Producer (Burg Productions), "providing the private investment and contracting to handle the post-production business." The film's budget was $125,000. After an article that implied that Kramreither had creative input into the film was published in Cinema Canada, Eastman wrote a letter to the editor disputing its accuracy:

Tony is my friend and a sweetheart but does have a tendency to take credit where it is not due... Tony had no creative involvement in the picture from start to finish and, indeed, only showed up on the set when we were shooting a nude scene (being basically a dirty young man)... I am very proud of A Sweeter Song, as my first feature, and I want people to know who did what.

=== Filming ===
The film's working title was Double Exposure. Shot in 16mm colour, principal photography for A Sweeter Song took place in Toronto from 6 September to 3 October 1975.

=== Music ===
Music for the film was composed and performed by David Jove. While no official soundtrack album was released, many of the film's songs are found on Jove's Sweeter Song vinyl LP (Pax Records, 1974). Video artist Jon Noel Shelton remarks that the version of Isn't It Funny in the film is distinctly different from the one on the album.

== Release ==
A Sweeter Song premiered in North and South Carolina theatres on 12 January 1976, followed by a screening at the 29th Cannes Film Festival in May, almost a year before its Canadian premiere in Toronto and Hamilton, Ontario on 11 March 1977 to a pair of reviews by The Globe and Mail and The Toronto Star on 11 and 16 March 1977, respectively.

=== Distribution ===
Kramreither signed a world sales and U.S. distribution deal on 30 April 1976 with Bob Hope's company Epoh: $250,000 for U.S. distribution with a $50,000 cash advance, not including TV sales. His experiences had made him an ardent believer in the "back-door policy" to Canadian distribution and world sales: "first you sell it and open it in the States, then you make your Canadian distribution deal" because: "Any film which has opened in the US will do better on the marketplace afterwards."

=== Home media ===
With the advent of the VCR, A Sweeter Song was released (as Snapshot) on VHS (VCI Video).

== Reception ==
=== Commercial performance ===
The film, like most of the B series Kramreither executive produced, was a financial success.

=== Critical response ===
==== Contemporary ====
Stephen Chesley predicted that the A Sweeter Song's contemporary audience would react well to the film's theme of youth sexuality: "overall there is a freshness and likeability to the film", and credits the novice director for choosing "such a difficult genre" and "bringing most of it off." Chesley praised both the cinematography, editing, and the principal cast of five actors for their strong, enthusiastic acting, singling out Susan Petrie:

Susan Petrie proves herself to be one of the best actresses in Canadian film with this role. Unlike her past typecasting as the frigid teenage tease, she finds things in this character that aren't in the script, and it's one of the few times we can see a contemporary young woman on the screen, especially considering the void that now exists in roles for women. She allows the script to overwhelm her at points too much relish in her dirty lines that are grafted onto the dialogue, and tossing away a term such as "meaningful relationship" by laughing at its wrenching commonness as she proclaims it in her character - but in her crucial moments she's completely believable, and carries her low comedy scenes with great timing.

Chesley was less impressed with the "far from full" characters themselves, faulting the script's tendency toward self-indulgence, low comedy, and extraneous scenes, speculating that Henshaw and Eastman were "too far removed" from the "type" of individual they were portraying in the film to do so "with any credibility", but elsewhere, the satire "works exceptionally well", as with the Canada Manpower scenes: "Henshaw's character would get into such a situation and act in the situation in just the way he does, and at the same time the whole experience, to everyone who's been through it, is a highly effective comedic extension of the horror of the real thing."

Natalie Edwards felt that Henshaw had not quite mastered comic timing and that it was "obvious" that this was Eastman's first film and that "sharper cutting might tighten up the film, which lags a little self-indulgently at the moment". Despite this, "the film has a lot of attractive features, not the least of which is a bright performance by Susan Petrie."

==== Retrospective ====
The Great Canadian Movie Guide describes the film as a wandering, counter-culture comedy that "starts out weakly," but "gets better, and more off-beat, as it goes along." It is a "likeable, product-of-its-time" with unabashed Canadianisms now "almost unheard of".

== Legacy ==
Although the success of A Sweeter Song launched Eastman's directing, writing and producing careers, looking back in 1985, Eastman himself was not sure whether the film's criticism of the Canadian film industry helped or hurt his career. While he continued directing, he did not release another feature film until The War Boy.
