= Jim Henshaw =

Canadian actor and producer

- Born: Bassano, Alberta, Canada
- Education: University of Saskatchewan
- Occupations: Actor, voice actor, screenwriter, producer

Jim Henshaw is a Canadian actor, screenwriter and film and television producer.

== Early life and education ==
Henshaw was born in Bassano, Alberta, Canada. He graduated from the University of Saskatchewan.

== Career ==
A mainstay of the Canadian theatre scene during the 1970s, he appeared in more than 50 productions of new Canadian plays, including the first performances of several works by playwright George F. Walker. His film career included such films as The Last Detail, Monkeys in the Attic, Lions for Breakfast, The Supreme Kid and A Sweeter Song for which he also wrote the screenplay.

Henshaw was the voice of Daniel Mouse and Beaver Drummer in the 1978 animated film The Devil and Daniel Mouse, a television special made by Nelvana, the Canadian animation company that worked on various television specials during this time from 1977 to 1980. In the field of animation, he is best known for playing Bright Heart Raccoon in The Care Bears Movie and The Care Bears Movie II: A New Generation, as well as Tenderheart Bear in The Care Bears Adventure in Wonderland and the television series The Care Bears Family.

He also starred in the Star Wars-inspired animated series, Ewoks, as Wicket W. Warrick and provided voices for the animated feature Heavy Metal.

He also supplied the voice of Zipper Cat in the early version of The Get Along Gang and did voices in two early animated films by including The Magic of Herself the Elf and Easter Fever. Henshaw has also made a guest appearance in two episodes of The Littlest Hobo.

In 1986, he underwent throat surgery, which altered his voice and limited the voices he could do. As a result, he transitioned his career into writing and producing, serving as a story editor or producer on such series as Adderly, Friday the 13th: The Series, Top Cops, War of the Worlds, Eerie, Indiana: The Other Dimension and BeastMaster. In addition to creating Top Cops, he has written more than a dozen television pilots, including Secret Service and The Lost World. He was also the creative force behind a successful series of romance films based on Harlequin Romance novels.

In addition to writing and producing, Henshaw is also the author of the Canadian show business and writing blog "The Legion of Decency".

== Filmography ==
=== Film ===
Year	Title	Role	Notes
1973	Class of '44	Fraternity Senior	Uncredited
1973	The Last Detail	Sweek	
1974	Monkeys in the Attic	Gus	
1975	Lions for Breakfast	Trick	
1976	A Sweeter Song	Cory	
1976	The Supreme Kid	Wes	
1977	Deadly Harvest	John McCrae	
1985	The Care Bears Movie	Bright Heart Raccoon	Voice
1986	Care Bears Movie II: A New Generation	Bright Heart Raccoon	Voice
1987	The Care Bears Adventure in Wonderland	Tenderheart Bear	Voice
1988	Care Bears Nutcracker Suite	Tenderheart Bear	Voice

=== Television ===
Year	Title	Role	Notes
1972–1974	Police Surgeon	Various roles	3 episodes
1974	The National Dream	Wilcox	Episode: "The Late Spike"
1974	Red Emma	Fedya Stein	Television film
1978	The Devil and Daniel Mouse	Daniel Mouse	Television film
1980	The Jack Rabbit Story	Aardvark	Television film
1983	The Magic of Herself the Elf	Wilfie	Television film
1984	The Get Along Gang	Zipper Cat	Episode: "Pilot"
1985	Ewoks	Wicket	13 episodes
1986–1988	The Care Bears Family	Tenderheart Bear	40 episodes
