= Intergalactic Thanksgiving =

1979 Canadian animated TV special

- Also known as: Please Don't Eat the Planet
- Screenplay by: Greg Duffell; Don Arioli; Martin Lavut
- Story by: Michael Hirsh; Frank Nissen; Clive A. Smith
- Directed by: Clive A. Smith
- Starring: Sid Caesar; Catherine O'Hara; Chris Wiggins; Jean Walker; Martin Lavut; Derek McGrath; Al Waxman; Toby Waxman
- Music by: Patricia Cullen
- Country of origin: Canada
- Original language: English

Production
- Producers: J. Gordon Arnold; Michael Hirsh; Patrick Loubert
- Production company: Nelvana

Original release
- Release: November 22, 1979

Intergalactic Thanksgiving, sometimes known as Please Don't Eat the Planet, is a 1979 Canadian Thanksgiving animated television special that premiered on CBC and in the United States in syndication on November 22, 1979. Intergalactic Thanksgiving was the fourth television special produced by Nelvana in their 1977 to 1980 series of specials, A Cosmic Christmas, The Devil and Daniel Mouse and Romie-0 and Julie-8, all premiering in 1977, 1978 and 1979.

The story revolves around farmers and aliens who try to get along after a serious ecological accident happens. The ranchers help the royal family of the planet Laffalot from their runaway foodmaking machine.

The special has been included on several Nelvana compilations, such as Animated Ink from 1980 and Nelvanamation (Volume 1), also from 1980.

== Cast ==
The voice cast included:

- King Goochie: Sid Caesar
- Ma Spademinder: Catherine O'Hara
- Pa Spademinder: Chris Wiggins
- Victoria Spademinder: Jean Walker
- Magic Mirror: Martin Lavut
- Notfunnyenuf: Derek McGrath
- The Bug: Al Waxman
- Bug Kid/Cromwell: Toby Waxman
