= CBC Film Festival =

Canadian television series

- Genre: feature film
- Country of origin: Canada
- Original language: English
- No. of seasons: 1

Production
- Producer: Don Elder
- Running time: 120 minutes

Original release
- Network: CBC Television
- Release: 5 June 1979 – 13 September 1980

CBC Film Festival is a Canadian feature film television series that aired on CBC Television from 1979 to 1980.

== Premise ==
Feature films, nearly all Canadian, were featured in this series. In the initial 1979 season, the remainder of the time slot after a film sometimes featured interviews with non-Canadian directors John Cromwell, George Cukor, Samuel Fuller, John Schlesinger, Martin Scorsese, Donald Siegel and John Sturges.

== Scheduling ==
This series appeared in a two-hour time slot, initially on Tuesdays at 9:00 p.m. (Eastern) from 5 June to 8 July 1979, then on Saturdays at 9:00 p.m.from 7 July to 22 September 1979, then a final run in the same time slot the following year, 7 June to 13 September 1980.

== Episodes ==
- The Clown Murders
- Deadly Harvest
- Drying Up the Streets
- The Far Shore
- The Fighting Men
- Goldenrod
- Inside Out
- J.A. Martin Photographer
- Kamouraska
- Lies My Father Told Me
- Lions for Breakfast
- The Little Girl Who Lives Down the Lane
- Love at First Sight
- One Man
- One Night Stand
- A Portrait of the Artist as a Young Man (American adaptation by Joseph Strick)
- Raku Fire
- Second Wind
- Skip Tracer
- Sudden Fury
- Who Has Seen the Wind
