= Robin Ward (television personality) =

Canadian actor and television personality

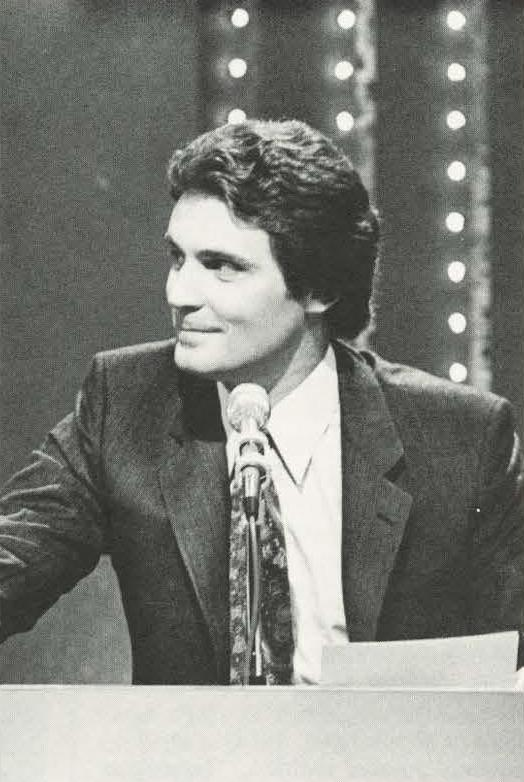
- Ward hosting To Tell the Truth circa 1981
- Born: April 1, 1944 (age 82); United Kingdom
- Occupations: Actor; television personality
- Years active: 1969–2015

Robin Ward (born April 1, 1944) is a Canadian actor and television personality. He is known for hosting a 1980 to 1981 revival of the American game show To Tell the Truth and later hosting a Canadian game show called Guess What from 1982 to 1988. He was also an actor on the soap opera The Guiding Light, in addition to having starred in the Canadian-produced 1973–74 science fiction series The Starlost and served as narrator of the late-1980s revival of The Twilight Zone for a season, replacing Charles Aidman. His film career included roles in many Canadian movies, such as Explosion (1969), Frankenstein on Campus (1970, as Victor Frankenstein), The Girl in Blue (1973), Sudden Fury (1975), and Thrillkill (1984).

Ward got his start in entertainment as a member of the Toronto-based folk-pop ensemble "The Allen-Ward Trio" during the mid 1960s. The Trio was often affiliated with Toronto's influential Yorkville/Rochdale hippie community, and were peers of Joni Mitchell and Neil Young during their early careers.

During the 1980s and 1990s, Ward worked for CFTO-TV in Toronto, Ontario, as a weatherman, and as an entertainment reporter. He was also an on-location reporter for Good Morning Toronto, a morning program on The Weather Network's Toronto-area feed from 1998 to 2003. He has played in a number of guest and supporting roles in television and some motion pictures.

In 2010, Ward narrated the well-received documentary series Greatest Tank Battles.

Preceded by Joe Garagiola	Host of To Tell the Truth; 1980–1981	Succeeded by Gordon Elliott in 1990
