= At Home (film) =

- Directed by: Martin Lavut
- Written by: Martin Lavut; Adrienne Horswill
- Starring: Martin Lavut; Adrienne Horswill
- Edited by: Peter Rowe
- Music by: Zalman Yanowsky
- Production company: Allan King Associates
- Distributed by: Canadian Filmmakers Distribution Centre
- Release date: 1968
- Running time: 13 minutes
- Country: Canada
- Language: English

At Home is a 1968 Canadian short documentary film directed by Martin Lavut. The film documents Lavut's home life, including his relationship with his girlfriend Adrienne Horswill. The film was originally commissioned by CBC Television, but the network declined to air the finished product.

The film won the award for Best Canadian Film at the Vancouver International Film Festival, and the Canadian Film Award for Best Film Under 30 Minutes at the 21st Canadian Film Awards in 1969.
