= Christmas Two Step =

Canadian television special

Christmas Two Step is a 1975 live-action/animated Canadian television special co-produced by Nelvana Limited, and broadcast on the CBC. A follow-up to the studio's earlier Small Star Cinema series, it tells the story of a girl who wants to be a lead dancer at a Christmas pageant. The production of the special brought in a handful of animators into the Nelvana crew.
