= A Pacemaker and a Sidecar =

- French: L'Eau chaude, l'eau frette
- Directed by: André Forcier
- Written by: André Forcier; François Gill; Jacques Marcotte
- Produced by: Bernard Lalonde
- Starring: Jean Lapointe
- Cinematography: François Gill
- Edited by: André Corriveau
- Music by: André Duchesne
- Production companies: Les Productions André Forcier; ACPAV
- Release date: May 1975 (Cannes)
- Running time: 94 minutes
- Country: Canada
- Language: French

A Pacemaker and a Sidecar (French: L'Eau chaude, l'eau frette, lit. "Hot Water, Cold Water") is a Canadian black comedy film, directed by André Forcier and released in 1976. The movie stars Jean Lapointe, Guy L'Écuyer, Sophie Clément, Louise Gagnon, Réjean Audet and Albert Payette.

It premiered in May 1975 at the Directors' Fortnight program at the 1976 Cannes Film Festival, and was later screened at the 1976 Festival of Festivals.

== Synopsis ==
The film centres on a group of residents of a rooming house in a working class neighbourhood in Montreal, who have gathered for the birthday party of their landlord Polo (Jean Lapointe), a local crime boss and loan shark.

The guests at the party include Amédée (Albert Payette) and Panama (Guy L'Écuyer), a gay couple who cater the party, and Carmen (Sophie Clément), a woman who owes Polo money for her daughter Francine's (Louise Gagnon) pacemaker and decides to pay the debt off with sex.

Meanwhile, Francine and her boyfriend Ti-Guy (Réjean Audet), who both dislike Polo, hatch a plot to kill him which backfires when another guest at the party dies instead.

== Cast ==
- Jean Lapointe
- Guy L'Écuyer
- Sophie Clément
- Louise Gagnon
- Réjean Audet
- Albert Payette
- JP Bergeron
- Anne-Marie Ducharme
- Elise Varo
- Françoise Berd
- Marcel Fournier
- Jacques Marcotte
- Roger Turcotte
- Jean Dansereau
- Jean-Pierre Piche
- J. Léo Gagnon
- Charlie Beauchamp
- Carole Laure
- André Forcier
- Roger Ramadier
- Gabriel Persechino
- Jean-Pierre Saulnier
- Madeleine Cardin
- Germaine Lemyre
- Madeleine Chartrand
- Francine Grimaldi

== Distribution ==
The film premiered in the Directors' Fortnight program at the 1976 Cannes Film Festival, and was later screened at the 1976 Festival of Festivals. Its screening at Toronto sparked a dispute between the festival and the national Film Festivals Bureau, with festival organizers claiming that they had been denied a screening on the grounds that the festival was too new and unimportant, while the Festivals Bureau claimed that it was simply a scheduling conflict, as the film's sole English print had already been booked by the Chicago International Film Festival, which was running at the same time as Toronto's festival. A compromise was reached whereby the print was shipped to Toronto for a screening in the early part of the festival, so that it could then be sent back to Chicago in time for that festival's scheduled screening.

Due to a technical issue with the film's original print, which was not noticed by theatrical audiences but became visible only when the film was transferred to higher-definition digital formats, it remained unavailable for many years on DVD or streaming platforms. A full digital restoration of the film was released to streaming platforms in April 2020.

== Reception ==
Author Jim Leach said that "Forcier draws on a long and rich surrealist tradition in Quebec culture, and in this film, the surreal breaks through only in odd images here and there, but it is also apparent in the way the characters create their own fantasies and rituals to make their lives bearable." Canadian film director Denis Chouinard put the film on his list as one of "Canada's top 10 films of all time."

The Charlatan noted that the film's English title is after two of the main points of interest in the film. They went on to say that "there seems to be a kind of resignation by the people to the kind of life they will lead; a young punk in the film seems a natural to replace the hood; violence is an accepted part of his life and he has grown up expecting it." They also opined that even though the film was technically well made, "the content tends to negate any idea of calling it a beautiful film."

Film critic Ray Ellenwood wrote the film "has a host of familiar, low-life characters, cheating and robbing each other." He highlighted the character, Francine, as a "hyper-intelligent, dangerous, anti-establishment youngster who wears a pacemaker at her waist that needs to be plugged in occasionally to keep her alive, but it can also be used to jump-start the battery on her friend's motorcycle." He further opined "that after she impassively accepted the attempted murder of her father by her slow-witted friend Julien, she rides off joyously into the sunset with her pubescent boyfriend on Julien's motorcycle."

Robert Labonte of The Ottawa Citizen observed that "Forcier's characters make up one big family, not always happy but always caring, and the neighborhood is the crazy, out-of-kilter sort that every big city deserves; not quite legal, not ever wealthy, not always happy, but hardly ever dull."

== See also ==
- Cinema of Canada
- List of Canadian films of 1975
- List of LGBTQ-related films of 1975
