= William Davidson (filmmaker) =

Canadian director, producer (1928–2009)

William Davidson (1928–2009) was a Canadian director, producer and writer whose career included work with the National Film Board of Canada, the Canadian Broadcasting Corporation and independent features. He is noted for directing the early English-Canadian movie Now That April's Here (1958) and producing the TV series The Forest Rangers (1963–65) and Adventures in Rainbow Country (1970–71).

== Career ==
Davidson was born in Toronto, Ontario, Canada. A graduate of the University of Western Ontario and the Lorne Greene Academy of Radio Arts, Davidson had some early experience in Toronto in theatre, radio and journalism. He joined the National Film Board in 1948. He directed and edited a number of films for the Board, including the series On the Spot, Faces of Canada and Canada Carries On. In 1955 he returned to Toronto, where he worked for the CBC as a producer-director, during which time he amassed credits on more than 1,000 live, taped and filmed TV programs.

In 1957, he formed his own production company with Norman Knelman. The pair produced and directed two early English-Canadian features – Now That April's Here, which was based on four short stories by Morley Callaghan, and The Ivy League Killers, a melodrama about juvenile delinquency. Neither film received wide distribution so Davidson re-joined the CBC as an executive producer for children and youth programs. In 1967, he began to work extensively with TVOntario (Ontario Educational Television), for whom he wrote more than 100 scripts on a wide variety of subjects and a stint as audiovisual consultant and producer at Expo '67.

He developed, wrote and directed a number of notable Canadian television series, including Razzle Dazzle, The Forest Rangers, Adventures in Rainbow Country and The Starlost.

Davidson died in Toronto in 2009.

== Films and television credits ==
- Country Auctioneer 1953 (director and writer)
- Station Master 1954 (directed, wrote and editor)
- The Hoax 1955 (director)
- Prepare for Advancement 1955 (directed and wrote)
- Now That April's Here 1958 (co-producer, director, editor)
- Ivy League Killers 1958 (co-producer and director)
- Razzle Dazzle 1961 (producer)
- The Forest Rangers 1963–65 (producer and writer)
- Adventures in Rainbow Country 1970–71 (producer, director and writer)
- The Starlost 1973 (producer)
- Lions for Breakfast 1975 (director)
- H. G. Wells' The Shape of Things to Come 1979 (producer)
- Matt and Jenny 1979–80 (producer and writer)
- Littlest Hobo 1980 (writer)
- Night Heat 1986 (writer)
