= Small Star Cinema =

- Genre: Fantasy
- Directed by: Michael Hirsh; Patrick Loubert
- Starring: Clive A. Smith
- Country of origin: Canada
- Original language: English
- No. of seasons: 1
- No. of episodes: 10

Production
- Producers: Michael Hirsh; Patrick Loubert
- Production location: Toronto
- Running time: 12 minutes
- Production company: Nelvana Limited

Original release
- Network: CBC Television
- Release: April 12, 1974 – May 24, 1975

Related
- Christmas Two Step

External videos
- "Mr Pencil Draws The Line" early Nelvana (16mm 1975), YouTube

Small Star Cinema is a series of live-action/animated shorts broadcast on CBC Television from April 12, 1974, to May 24, 1975, as part of their Bagatelle, Camera Twelve and Children's Cinema series. It was produced by Michael Hirsh and Patrick Loubert, and starred Clive A. Smith. Each short began with a small animated character purposefully walking into a spotlight. The series was then followed by the 1975 Christmas special Christmas Two Step also made for the CBC that has a similar premise.

Small Star Cinema was one of the first series made by Canada's Nelvana Limited; known as Nelvana Films at the time, and was their first television program. All 10 of the Small Star Cinema shorts have been documented online, however, almost all of the shorts have been lost. Only one short, "Mr. Pencil Draws the Line", broadcast on April 12, 1975, has been recovered, and can be found on YouTube as of January 2020.

== Episodes ==
No.	Title	Directed by	Original release date
1	"Waltz in Mounted Time"	Patrick Loubert	April 12, 1974
The dreams two brothers have in that moment of half-sleep and half-awakening.
2	"Birds of Music"	Michael Hirsh	April 19, 1974
An animated film about a little girl who plays the piano to sound like singing birds.
3	"Wild Goose Chase"	Patrick Loubert	April 26, 1974
The story of Lydia and a Canada goose.
4	"Mr. Rubbish's Children's Tour of the Big City"	Patrick Loubert	May 3, 1974
5	"Smile-A-Day"	Michael Hirsh	May 10, 1974
6	"The Happy Chalk Dog"	Michael Hirsh	December 26, 1974
A bedtime story invented by a little boy who plays the star role.
7	"Zounds of Music"	Patrick Loubert	January 1, 1975
A young girl chases a musical note.
8	"Mr. Pencil Draws the Line"	Michael Hirsh	April 12, 1975
The famous pencil Mr. Pencil leaves his house and is bothered by some kids who want him to draw more. As he walks through Toronto, a police officer takes pictures of him until he is hit by a board, breaking his lead. Mr. Pencil is sent to The Hospital for Sick Children, where Debbie tells him that some kids in the playroom want him to draw for them. At the playroom, some musicians sing "Amen" for the kids, then they welcome Mr. Pencil, who will animate stories the kids make up. One kid tells a story where Mr. Pencil is sharpened, then repeatedly abused and eaten by a grandmother. Another kid turns the grandmother into the wolf from Little Red Riding Hood. A girl tells about a black knight whose tongue is a punching glove, and ends the story with Mr. Pencil being hit by a truck. Mr. Pencil would rather dance and sing, so they briefly do the Hokey Pokey. Jamie and Ryan give Mr. Pencil a pencil sharpener as a present; it fits him perfectly and he feels better. Note: This is the most documented episode of the series. This episode was copyrighted in 1974 and released in 1975. This is the only episode found up to this point.
9	"Battle of the Alphabet"	Patrick Loubert	May 3, 1975
An animated film using the alphabet to explain such subjects as aggression, war and peace.
10	"The Great Cicillo"	Patrick Loubert	May 24, 1975
A film about a clown (Bob Cinci) who immigrates to Canada in search of the genuine laugh.
