= The War Boy =

1985 film directed by Allan Eastman

- VHS cover (UK)
- Directed by: Allan Eastman
- Written by: Julius Kohanyi; Jim Osborne
- Story by: Julius Kohanyi
- Produced by: William Marshall; James MacDonald (associate producer); Milan Stanisic (associate producer)
- Starring: Helen Shaver; Kenneth Welsh; Jason Hopley
- Cinematography: Tomislav Pinter; Fred Luchetti
- Edited by: Vesna Kreber
- Music by: Peter Wetzler
- Production companies: Marshall Arts; Jadran Film
- Distributed by: Norstar Releasing
- Release date: 1985
- Running time: 86 minutes
- Countries: Canada, Yugoslavia
- Language: English

The War Boy is a 1985 Canadian-Yugoslav war drama film and the second feature film to be directed by Allan Eastman about a boy growing up in war torn Eastern Europe.

== Plot ==
In 1940, after the outbreak of the Second World War, life is hard in a small East European border town under Nazi occupation, as witnessed primarily by a Canadian-born twelve-year-old boy, Jan (Jason Hopley). At times life appears to go on as normal: Jan plays with his dog and has a good relationship with his father Stephan (Kenneth Welsh). But after all a war is on, and with an occupation come midnight raids and violence in the form of street shootings and exploding mortar shells.

Jan's father helps a Jewish family stay in hiding, but also houses an SS officer (Slobodan Dimitrijević) passing through the town. Jan, who has already lost his mother, fears his father may ultimately not survive the war. His stepmother Maria (Helen Shaver) treats him with disdain, and flirts with the German officer. Like his father, Jan defies the Nazis by helping the Jews escape, but is also affected by the sight of wounded German soldiers passing by his home.

Jan's character is tempered by these events like "the making of a fine sword"; the boy will become a man ready to "forge his future in a country without fear and hate."

== Cast ==
- Helen Shaver • Maria
- Kenneth Welsh • Stephan Berecky
- Jason Hopley • Jan
- Ingrid Veninger • Helena
- Mario Mirkovic (credited as Milan Mirkovic) • Anton
- Vjenceslav Kapural (credited as Venco Kaporal) • Moscovitz
- Michelle Paniagua • Ibolya
- Damir Mejovšek • Russian soldier/Soldier
- Derrick Hart • Grandpa (George)
- Slobodan Dimitrijević • SS Captain
- Zlatko Pokupec • Circus leader(credited as Zlatko "Pinky" Pokupec)
- Ðani Šegina • Matthew
- Mustafa Nadarević • Mill manager
- Semka Sokolović • Kati
- Vida Jerman • Anton's mom
- Marijan Habazin • Pityu (credited as Dado Habazin)
- Ivan Nitikin • Clown
- Zvonimir Ilijić • Hotel clerk (credited as Zvonko Ilijić)
- Milan Balic • Maria's lover
- Tom Stojkovic • Russian officer (credited as Toni Stojkovic)
- Demeter Bitenc • Arrow Cross officer (credited as Demetar Bitenc)
- Sajo • Toby

In addition, various soldiers were played by Ilija Ivezić and Damir Mejovšek.

Voice performers: Mary Beth Rubens, Peter Jobin, Michael Kirby, Jeff Pustil, and Robyn Jaffe.

== Themes ==
The War Boy has been compared to the "similarly themed" Empire of the Sun, a 1987 film by Steven Spielberg which also depicts "a child's eye view of the horrors of war."

== Production ==
=== Background and financing ===
After making his first feature, A Sweeter Song (1976), Allan Eastman directed around a hundred television productions before undertaking a second feature, which was made with the support of Telefilm Canada.

=== Filming ===
The film's working title was Point of Escape. Unlike A Sweeter Song, which was shot on 16mm film, The War Boy was shot on 35mm (Kodak 5247 and 5294). Principal photography took place in Zagreb, Croatia (then part of Yugoslavia) from 24 September to 28 October 1984.

== Release and reception ==
The War Boy was released in 1985 and distributed by Norstar Releasing, Peter Simpson's recently created (1984) Canadian independent distribution company.

=== Home media ===
The War Boy was released on VHS, Betamax, and DVD.

In 2007, The War Boy was released as part of a war film anthology DVD box set of five discs by Eclectic called the Dogs o' War Collection, featuring ten films predominantly by Italian directors, prompting Chadwick Jenkins to call them "Spaghetti War Flicks" after Spaghetti Westerns.

=== Critical response ===
Jenkins praises The War Boy, saying it "beautifully captures the contradictions of wartime and the devastating nature of simply living and growing up in such times." His only criticism of the film is that the "News on the March" opening sequence is undermined "by having the credits roll over the newsreel." The film is "unjustly underrated", and when compared with Spielberg's big-budget Empire of the Sun (1987), is arguably "more successful on an intimate, personal level in depicting a child's eye view of the horrors of war." Terry Rowan calls Jason Hopely's novice performance "beautiful", as does VideoHound's Golden Movie Retriever, which assigns the film 2.5 stars.

The Great Canadian Movie Guide, by sharp contrast, derides The War Boy as "choppy and confusingly disjointed", "with somewhat stilted performances and dialogue" and fails to develop most characters and scenes, or even the idea that the children were born in Canada.
