= Buckley Petawabano =

Cree Canadian actor (1947 or 1948 – 2025)

Buckley Petawabano (1947 or 1948 – October 19, 2025) was a Cree Canadian cinematographer, production company founder and actor from the Mistassini reserve in northern Québec.

== Early life ==
Petawabano was born in a Cree settlement near Lake Mistassini. As part of the Canadian Indian residential school system, he attended Bishop Horden Memorial School and Shingwauk Indian Residential School.

== Career ==
In 1969, Petawabano had his first acting role in the CBC series Adventures in Rainbow Country.

He was the most prominent Indigenous Canadian cinematographer and actor after Chief Dan George. With the role of Pete Gawa, he became the first Indigenous Canadian to star in a Canadian television production series.

In 1970s, he starred in Cold Journey, a film focused on the journey of a 15-year old boy raised in residential schools. Petawabano's performance was praised by Peter Bakogeorge of the Edmonton Journal.

His other film credits include Cree Hunters of Mistassini (1974), Pelts: Politics of the Fur Trade (1989), Cree Way (1977), and Amisk (1977), the latter two marked his debut contributions of photography and editing. He also had a stint on stage in Montreal's George Ryga play The Ecstasy of Rita Joe (1972).

== Death and legacy ==
Petawabano died on October 19, 2025, at the age of 77.

An award is named after him from the Cree Nation Arts and Crafts Association.

== See also ==
- List of Indigenous Canadian actors
