= The Supreme Kid =

- Directed by: Peter Bryant
- Written by: Peter Bryant; John Ancevitch
- Produced by: Byron Black; Peter Bryant; David Tompkins
- Starring: Frank Moore; Jim Henshaw; Don Granbery
- Cinematography: Tony Westman
- Edited by: Sally Paterson
- Music by: Howie Vickers
- Production company: Seventh Wave Films
- Distributed by: Cinépix
- Release date: July 19, 1976 (KVIFF)
- Running time: 90 minutes
- Country: Canada
- Language: English

The Supreme Kid is a Canadian comedy film, directed by Peter Bryant and released in 1976. The film stars Frank Moore and Jim Henshaw as Ruben and Wes, two drifters wandering around British Columbia who get drawn into committing armed robbery after meeting fellow drifter Wilbur (Don Granbery).

The cast also includes Helen Shaver as a hitchhiker with whom Ruben and Wes have a brief sexual encounter; Bill Reiter as Edward Schorr, a con man who steals their possessions after posing as a gay priest; Terry David Mulligan as Luther Midruff, a motorist whom they aid when his car breaks down; and Byron Black as Jack, the leader of a motorcycle gang.

== Cast ==
- Frank Moore as Ruben
- Jim Henshaw as Wes
- Don Granbery as Wilbur
- Helen Shaver as Girl Hitch-Hiker
- Bill Reiter as Highway Padre
- Gordon Robertson as Frankie
- Terry David Mulligan as Midruff
- Paddy White as Wharf Man
- Claudine Melgrave as Farmer's Wife
- Ollie Olson as Tow Truck Owner (credited as Ollie Olsen)
- Byron Black as Jack, The Biker
- Jim McGillveray as "Wiggy", The Biker
- Tim Lowery as "Fats", The Biker
- Tom Snelgrove as Moses
- Gary Hetherington as Norman
- Terry Waterhouse as Dudley (credited as Terrence Waterhouse)
- Bruce MacLeod as Police Sergeant (credited as Bruce McLeod)

== Production and distribution ==
The film entered production in 1974, but faced various financing and production delays until Bryant secured a distribution deal with Cinépix. It screened in 1976 at the Cannes Film Market, before having its public premiere at the 1976 Karlovy Vary International Film Festival.

It was subsequently screened at the 1976 Toronto International Film Festival.
