= Terry David Mulligan =

Canadian radio and television personality

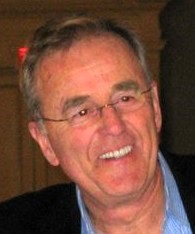
- Mulligan in 2010
- Born: 30 June 1942 (age 83); New Westminster, British Columbia, Canada
- Other name: TDM
- Occupations: Actor; Radio & TV personality
- Years active: 1972–present
- Spouse(s): Carole Ann, early 1970s Meg Mulligan (1977–present)
- Children: 4

Terry David Mulligan (born June 30, 1942) is a Canadian actor and radio and television personality based in Vancouver, British Columbia.

== Life and career ==
Born in New Westminster, British Columbia, Mulligan worked as a Royal Canadian Mounted Police (RCMP) officer in Olds, Alberta, and Red Deer, Alberta, from 1960 through 1964. After leaving the Mounties, Mulligan worked as a radio disc jockey for 20 years, he hosted a TV show on Global TV called The New Quiz Kids, and then joined CBC Television as host of the music video series Good Rockin' Tonite (simultaneously, he was also a regular on the children's TV series Zig Zag, produced by BCTV). He left the CBC in 1985 to become a VJ and producer for MuchMusic West – a show he created, covering primarily the West Coast music scene as host of the long-running Much West series. At the same time he also hosted MovieTelevision for Citytv. His stories and MT provided years of support for the Canadian TV and film industry.

He was a program host and producer for the Canadian entertainment channel Star!. He also hosts two weekly radio programs on Alberta public radio station CKUA: Mulligan Stew, a long-running two-hour music program, and Tasting Room Radio, a one-hour weekly food and wine radio program about food, wine and winemakers, and with a rock and roll attitude. Tasting Room Radio was also broadcast on CKFR AM 1150 in Kelowna, British Columbia, and CKST AM 1040 in Vancouver.

Mulligan is a prolific character actor who has been featured in supporting and small roles in many movies and television series including, notably, The Accused, The X-Files, Millennium, Robson Arms, Hard Core Logo, and the 2005 Fantastic Four movie. Most films and TV shows in which he appears are filmed in the Vancouver area.

For his work in arts and entertainment broadcasting Mulligan has been awarded a Lifetime Achievement Award from the West Coast Awards show The Leos. He's also been inducted into the BC Entertainment Hall of Fame. Mulligan was named "Broadcaster of the Year" for 2011 by the British Columbia Association of Broadcasters.

He has four children, Mindy, Sean, Fynn, and Kate; and three grandchildren, Kyle, Taleigha, and Avelyn. He has been married since 1977 to Meg Mulligan. Their children sometimes appear on Mulligan Stew. In an August 2007 radio interview on Sounds like Canada, Kate and her father discussed an article by Kate, published in The Tyee, called "Growing up Mulligan", a humorous account of life with Mulligan.

Mulligan also co-hosts a show about wine called Hollywood & Vines with fellow actor Jason Priestley which is filmed at wine vineyards around the world. The show is seen in 180 countries via Travel Channel UK (London) and Super Channel in Canada. The third year of the series is now in production.

Mulligan has published his autobiography (co-written by Vancouverite Glen Schaefer) called Mulligan's Stew. The book covers his life from growing up in North Vancouver to the present day.

== Filmography ==
Year	Title	Role	Notes
1974	Christina	Policeman	
1976	The Supreme Kid	Midruff	
1986	The Boy Who Could Fly	Mr. Brandt	
1988	Betrayed	Minister	
1988	The Accused	Lieutenant Duncan	
1990	Look Who's Talking Too	IRS Inspector	
1991	Eye of the Widow	Mac Carthy	
1991	Mystery Date	Mr. McHugh	
1995	Deadly Sins	Doc	
1996	Hard Core Logo	Mulligan	
1998	Disturbing Behavior	Nathan Clark	
1999	Mr. Rice's Secret	Potential Buyer	
1999	Mystery, Alaska	Dr. Henry Savage	
2001	Suddenly Naked	TV Host	
2005	Fantastic Four	CityTV Reporter	
2008	45 R.P.M.	Radio D.J.	
2009	Polar Storm	General Mayfield	
