= Thrillkill =

1984 Canadian thriller film

- Directed by: Anthony D'Andrea
- Written by: Anthony D'Andrea
- Produced by: Anthony Kramreither
- Starring: Gina Massey; Robin Ward
- Cinematography: John Clement
- Edited by: Nick Rotundo
- Music by: Tim McCauley
- Production company: Brightstar Films
- Release date: December 14, 1984
- Running time: 90 minutes
- Country: Canada
- Language: English

Thrillkill is a Canadian crime thriller film, directed by Anthony D'Andrea and released in 1984. The film stars Gina Massey as Bobbie Kendall, a woman on the run from an electronic bank robbery ring after her video game designer sister Carly (Diana Reis) hid the money inside her new game Thrillkill before being murdered, leaving Bobbie as the only person who knows where the password is hidden.

The film's cast also includes Robin Ward as police officer Frank Gillette, Laura Robinson as Carly's accomplice Adrian, Frank Moore as the CEO of Brightstar Games, and Eugene Clark and Colleen Embree as video arcade owners involved in the robbery scheme.

John Clement received a Genie Award nomination for Best Cinematography at the 6th Genie Awards in 1985.
