= The List (The X-Files) =

- The X-Files episode
- The head of a death row prison guard named Fornier, found inside a paint can.
- Episode no.: Season 3 Episode 5
- Directed by: Chris Carter
- Written by: Chris Carter
- Production code: 3X05
- Original air date: October 20, 1995
- Running time: 45 minutes

Guest appearances
- Bokeem Woodbine as Sammon Roque; Badja Djola as Napoleon "Neech" Manley; John Toles-Bey as John Speranza; Ken Foree as Vincent Parmelly; April Grace as Danielle Manley; Greg Rogers as Daniel Charez; J. T. Walsh as Warden Brodeur; Bruce Pinard as Perry Simon, the executioner

Episode chronology
← Previous "Clyde Bruckman's Final Repose"	Next → "2Shy"
- The X-Files season 3

"The List" is the fifth episode of the third season of the science fiction television series The X-Files. It was first broadcast in the United States on the Fox network on October 20, 1995. "The List" was written and directed by series creator Chris Carter. The episode is a "Monster-of-the-Week" story, a stand-alone plot which is unconnected to the series' larger mythology. "The List" received a Nielsen household rating of 10.8, being watched by 16.72 million people on its initial broadcast, and received mixed to positive reviews from critics.

The show centers on FBI special agents Fox Mulder (David Duchovny) and Dana Scully (Gillian Anderson) who work on cases linked to the paranormal, called X-Files. Mulder is a believer in the paranormal, while the skeptical Scully has been assigned to debunk his work. In this episode, Mulder and Scully investigate a case where a death row inmate declares that he will be reincarnated and that as a result five men will die.

"The List" was written and directed by Carter after the success of the second season episode "Duane Barry". The art department of The X-Files was tasked with creating a death row set quickly, a feat which eventually caused the episode to go over budget. Several sequences necessitated the use of real maggots, a turn of events that was not popular with the cast, most notably with Anderson. "The List" later was nominated—and won—several International Monitor Awards.

== Plot ==
Napoleon "Neech" Manley (Badja Djola), a death row inmate at a Florida prison, is brought to the electric chair. Before he is executed, Neech proclaims that he will be reincarnated and avenge himself against five men who tormented him in prison.

Shortly after the execution, Fox Mulder (David Duchovny) and Dana Scully (Gillian Anderson) investigate the prison after a guard is mysteriously found dead in Neech's cell. The agents meet the prison's warden, Brodeur (J. T. Walsh), who believes that Neech planned the guard's murder with someone on the outside before the execution. John Speranza, another inmate, believes that Neech has returned. When Scully explores the prison's showers, she meets another guard named Vincent Parmelly (Ken Foree). He claims that another prisoner, Roque (Bokeem Woodbine), is keeping a list of the remaining four victims.

Later, the head of another guard, Fornier, is found inside a paint can. An examination of the head shows the premature appearance of larvae. The prison coroner tells Scully that the first guard's lungs were completely infested with the larvae, belonging to the green bottle fly. Meanwhile, Mulder talks to Roque, who wants a transfer out of the prison in exchange for revealing the remaining three people on the list, but Brodeur refuses to let this happen. Brodeur later finds Fornier's headless body in his office. While searching Neech's cell, Mulder discovers evidence of his obsession with reincarnation. The agents talk to Neech's fearful widow, Danielle Manley (April Grace), who is secretly seeing Parmelly. Roque is brought to the showers, where he is beaten to death by Brodeur after revealing he is the fifth person on the list.

Brodeur puts the prison under lockdown and tells Mulder that Neech had a violent history with all three victims. Mulder believes that Neech came back for revenge against the guards but doubts that Roque was on the list. He requests that he be provided with the name of Neech's executioner, who turns out to be a volunteer named Perry Simon. The agents arrive at Simon's home to discover his decomposing body in the attic. Mulder confronts Speranza about the list, but Speranza only tells him that Roque was not on it. He claims to have seen Neech "big as life" outside his cell. Based on phone records, Scully theorizes that Neech's lawyer, Danny Charez, may have engineered the murders with Speranza. The agents interview Charez, who tells them about Danielle's relationship with Parmelly; after they leave, Charez is suffocated by a resurrected Neech.

Brodeur visits Speranza in his cell and offers to have his death sentence commuted in exchange for stopping the murders. Speranza takes the offer. That night, Parmelly visits Danielle, who has become agitated since Mulder and Scully have begun staking out her house. The agents now suspect Parmelly to be behind the murders and leave to notify Brodeur, who asks that Parmelly be arrested. Soon afterward, Danielle wakes up to see Neech standing at her bedroom door. She grabs her gun and confronts Parmelly, thinking he is Neech's resurrected form. The agents and a police task force arrive to see her shoot and kill Parmelly. Meanwhile, Brodeur—assuming that Charez and Parmelly were on the list—thinks Speranza has reneged on their deal and has him taken to the showers. Before Brodeur kills him, Speranza claims that one person remains on the list.

Parmelly is blamed for the murders. The agents start to leave Florida, but Mulder soon pulls over. He remains frustrated, since Parmelly was on-duty during only one murder and was not one of the three men who knew Perry Simon's confidential identity. He also points out inconsistencies in the actions of Parmelly and Roque, who was also assumed to be part of the plot. Mulder believes that Parmelly was not responsible for the deaths, and that Neech had indeed been reincarnated to exact his revenge. However, Scully convinces Mulder that the case is over, and that they should return home. Just then, Brodeur passes them in his car. Looking in his rearview mirror, he sees Neech, who attacks Brodeur and causes his car to crash into a tree, claiming his last victim.

== Production ==
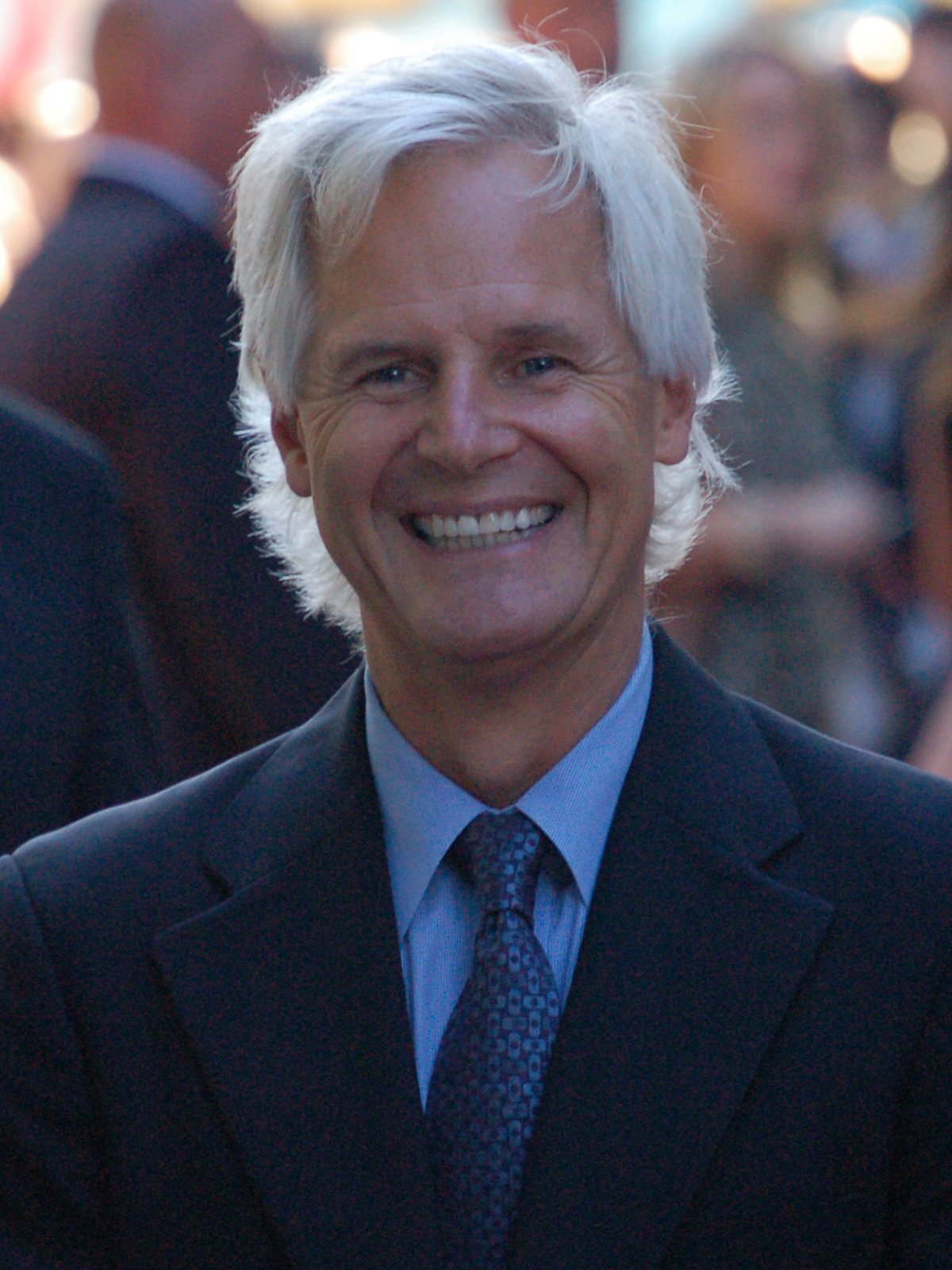
The episode was written and directed by Chris Carter.

"The List" was written and directed by series creator Chris Carter, making it the second time he had directed an episode after season two's "Duane Barry". For this episode, the art department was asked to create a "convincing" death row set "out of thin air". The set took 10 days to construct, making it one of the season's more complicated set assignments. Construction of the set almost single-handedly caused the episode to go over budget, but the show was able to reuse the set in the season in the later season episodes "Teso Dos Bichos" and "Talitha Cumi". Unaffiliated television and film projects in the Greater Vancouver area also rented the set for use in their productions.

For many of the scenes, the show's producers opted to use real maggots—creatures that series co-star Gillian Anderson later called among the hardest animals with which to work. Due to a number of issues, the show's design crew was not able to create a "full-body replica" of the first murder victim, so the portraying actor had to lay on an autopsy table while maggots were poured over his body. In other scenes, rice grains were used as maggot stand-ins. The elaborate car crash featured at the end of the episode was described by stunt coordinator Tony Morelli as "the most harrowing action sequence" during the show's third season. Hoping to give the episode somewhat of a different look, the producers applied a green tint to the film in the post-production editing process.

The executioner, Perry Simon, was named after an NBC executive producer that Carter knew. The part was played by Bruce Pinard. Joseph Patrick Finn, a producer on the show, played the prison chaplain. Guest actor Greg Rogers, who played Daniel Charez, recalled that Finn — whom Rogers had years earlier fired from an acting job at the Citadel Theatre in Edmonton — interrupted a take to joke on set that Rogers was not welcome there, telling him afterward that being let go had turned out to be the best thing that ever happened to his career.

== Reception ==
"The List" premiered on the Fox network in the United States on October 20, 1995. The episode earned a Nielsen rating of 10.8, with a 19 share, meaning that roughly 10.8 percent of all television-equipped households, and 19 percent of households watching television, were tuned in to the episode. It was watched by a total of 16.72 million viewers, and was later nominated for several International Monitor Awards, including nominations for best director, best editing, and best color correction. "The List" later won the award for best director. Story editor Frank Spotnitz said of the episode, "I think this is a vastly underrated episode. I also think it was a very brave and different show to do and that it will weather the test of time very well. I think it was brave because there is not a single likable character - nobody you can root for. Mulder and Scully do not solve the case, and that is something I had been interested in doing for some time." Chris Carter was nominated for an award by the Directors Guild of America for his work on this episode.

"The List" received mixed to positive reviews from television critics. Entertainment Weekly gave "The List" a B+, describing it as "standard but well executed". Zack Handlen, writing for The A.V. Club, had mixed feelings about it, ultimately rating it a B−. He felt that "The List" embodied a bland stand-alone X-Files episode for its underdeveloped concept and script, with "attempts at drama" that had no depth, and "sideplots [that] have so little effect on the main narrative as to be basically padding". Handlen however praised the cinematography and art direction, the performances of both Ken Foree and J.T. Walsh, and the final scene, but ultimately considered that "once you get past the set-design and cinematography, you end up with some good lines and a few scary moments, and that's it."

Paula Vitaris from Cinefantastique gave the episode two stars out of four. She praised Carter's directing, but felt that the story suffered in comparison to the second season's "Duane Barry", also written and directed by Carter, which was better at "unsettling ambiguity". She felt that there were too many characters for the audience to get to know them, and the lack of resolution would leave the audience "utterly frustrated". Other reviews were more critical. Author Phil Farrand wrote negatively of the episode, calling it his third least favorite episode of the first four seasons in his book The Nitpickers Guide to the X-Files. Robert Shearman, in his book Wanting to Believe: A Critical Guide to The X-Files, Millennium & The Lone Gunmen, rated the episode one-and-a-half stars out of five. The author positively critiqued Carter's directing, calling the entry "good looking" and noting that it was "a decidedly grisly hour of television." However, Shearman derided the plot and called it "barely cooked", writing that the characters that are killed are wholly one-dimensional and are not fleshed out.

== Bibliography ==
- Edwards, Ted (1996). X-Files Confidential. Little, Brown and Company. ISBN 0316218081.
- Farrand, Phil (1998), The Nitpickers Guide to the X-Files, Doubleday Direct, ISBN 1-56865-503-7
- Hurwitz, Matt; Knowles, Chris (2008). The Complete X-Files. Insight Editions. ISBN 978-1933784809.
- Lovece, Frank (1996). The X-Files Declassified. Citadel Press. ISBN 080651745X.
- Lowry, Brian (1996). Trust No One: The Official Guide to the X-Files. Harper Prism. ISBN 0061053538.
- Shearman, Robert (2009). Wanting to Believe: A Critical Guide to The X-Files, Millennium & The Lone Gunmen. Mad Norwegian Press. ISBN 9780975944691.
