= Allan Eastman =

Canadian television director and executive producer

- Born: Haldon Darryl Allan Eastman; July 6, 1948 (age 77); Manitoba, Canada
- Spouse: Cynthia Ashperger

Haldon Darryl Allan Eastman (born July 6, 1948) is a Canadian television director and executive producer.

Born in Manitoba, Eastman received a Bachelor of Arts degree from the University of Manitoba in 1971. He then studied at the Film School of the University of Bristol where he wrote and directed his first film A Sweeter Song. He directed the feature films The War Boy (1985), Crazy Moon (1986) and Danger Zone (1996).

Eastman was an executive producer for television shows including Night Man, Beastmaster and Gene Roddenberry's Andromeda. He has also directed episodes for TV shows such as The Littlest Hobo, Road to Avonlea, Beachcombers, Friday the 13th: The Series, Danger Bay, Sliders, Night Man, F/X: The Series, Poltergeist: The Legacy, Gene Roddenberry's Earth: Final Conflict, Star Trek: Deep Space Nine, Star Trek: Voyager, Gene Roddenberry's Andromeda and Degrassi: The Next Generation.

Eastman's miniseries Ford: The Man and the Machine was the recipient of three Gemini Awards, including Best Miniseries, and seven other nominations, while Race for the Bomb and Champagne Charlie also earned seven Gemini nominations. Eastman also received a Golden Reel Award, as the director of Ford, and a 2001 Leo Award for Andromeda Best Dramatic Series.

== Films ==
- A Sweeter Song - 1976
- The War Boy - 1985
- Crazy Moon - 1987
- Danger Zone - 1996

== Television ==
- Night Man
- Beastmaster
- The Littlest Hobo
- Road to Avonlea
- Beachcombers
- Friday the 13th: The Series
- Danger Bay
- Sliders
- Night Man
- F/X: The Series
- Poltergeist: The Legacy
- Gene Roddenberry's Earth: Final Conflict
- Star Trek: Deep Space Nine
- Star Trek: Voyager
- Gene Roddenberry's Andromeda
- Degrassi: The Next Generation
- Stargate SG1: Episode 13
- Champagne Charlie (1989)
