= Adventures in Rainbow Country =

Canadian television series

- Created by: William Davidson
- Starring: Stephen Cottier; Buckley Petawabano; Susan Conway; Albert Millaire; Wally Koster; Alan Mills; Lois Maxwell
- Country of origin: Canada
- Original language: English
- No. of episodes: 26

Production
- Executive producer: Ralph C. Ellis
- Running time: 30 minutes (time slot)
- Production companies: Manitou Productions Limited in association with the Canadian Broadcasting Corporation and ABC Television Films Limited

Original release
- Network: CBC
- Release: 20 September 1970 – 28 March 1971

Adventures in Rainbow Country is a Canadian television series that aired on CBC Television in the 1970–71 television season. Reruns were later shown on the American children's cable channel Nickelodeon during the early 1980s. A half hour family drama, the show starred Lois Maxwell (of James Bond fame) as Nancy Williams, a widow raising her children Billy (Stephen Cottier) and Hannah (Susan Conway) in rural Northern Ontario.

== Setting ==
The show was filmed in 1969 around Whitefish Falls, which is near Espanola, Ontario, Canada. Many scenes were also shot at Rainbow Lodge on Birch Island and on Manitoulin Island.

== Production and broadcasts ==
The show was very popular in Canada and technically never cancelled. No further episodes were produced after the first season. There were 26 episodes produced in total.

The series was also broadcast in the 1970s in Australia on ABC.

It has continued to air in repeats, both in Canada and internationally – in Canada, the show had been seen on DejaView and Silver Screen Classics. In the United Kingdom it aired on ITV. In Australia, the series is screened on GEM.

== Cast ==
- Stephen Cottier as Billy Williams
- Buckley Petawabano as Pete Gawa, Billy's Ojibwa friend
- Susan Conway as Hannah Williams
- Albert Millaire as Roger Lemieux, photographer/journalist
- Wally Koster as Dennis McGubgub, bush pilot
- Alan Mills as Dougal MacGregor, tugboat skipper
- Lois Maxwell as Nancy Williams

=== Guest appearances ===
Actors who made appearances on the show included Donald Harron, Ken James, Chris Wiggins, Austin Willis, Peter Donat, Gordon Pinsent, Margot Kidder, Len Birman, Percy Rodrigues, Duke Redbird, Jean-Louis Roux, Murray Westgate, Anthony Kramreither, Ratch Wallace and Eric Christmas.

== Episodes ==
1. "La Chute" (20 September 1970)
2. "The Tower" (27 September 1970)
3. "The Frank Williams' File" (4 October 1970)
4. "Skydiver" (11 October 1970)
5. "The Kid from Spanish Harlem" (18 October 1970)
6. "Panic in the Bush" (25 October 1970)
7. "Long Tough Race" (1 November 1970)
8. "The Town That Died" (8 November 1970)
9. "The Eye of the Needle" (15 November 1970)
10. "Girl on a Tightrope" (22 November 1970)
11. "The Return of Eli Roqcue" (29 November 1970)
12. "Roar of the Hornet" (6 December 1970)
13. "Lac du Diable" (13 December 1970)
14. "The Muskies Are Losing Their Teeth" (20 December 1970)
15. "Milk Run" (27 December 1970)
16. "A Wall of Silence" (3 January 1971)
17. "Where the Rice Grows Wild" (10 January 1971)
18. "Bird Watchers" (17 January 1971)
19. "The Boy Who Loved Animals" (24 January 1971)
20. "Mystery at Whaleback Bay" (31 January 1971)
21. "Night Caller" (7 February 1971)
22. "Lake on Blue Mountain" (14 February 1971)
23. "Stolen Tugboat" (7 March 1971)
24. "The Hermit" (14 March 1971)
25. "Pursuit Along the Aux Sauble" (21 March 1971)
26. "Dreamer's Rock" (28 March 1971)

== Legacy ==
The Sudbury and Manitoulin Districts are to this day known as the Rainbow Country tourist region, as a result of this series.

A cast, crew, and fan reunion event took place in Whitefish Falls from 11 to 14 August 2006.
