= Now That April's Here =

1958 Canadian film directed by William Davidson

Now That April’s Here
- Directed by: William Davidson
- Written by: Norman Klenman
- Produced by: William Davidson; Norman Klenman
- Starring: Don Borisenko; Judy Welch; John Drainie; Katherine Blake; Tony Grey; Walter Massey; Beth Amos; Alan Hood; Nancy Lou Gill; Fred Diehl; Anne Collings; Kathy McNeil
- Narrated by: Raymond Massey
- Cinematography: William H. Gimmi
- Edited by: William Davidson; Norman Klenman
- Music by: John Hubert Bath
- Distributed by: International Film Distributors
- Release date: June 20, 1958
- Running time: 84 minutes
- Country: Canada
- Language: English
- Budget: $75,000 (estimated)

Now That April’s Here is a 1958 English-Canadian feature from William Davidson and Norman Knelman based on short stories by Morley Callaghan.

Now That April's Here was an early English-Canadian movie shot on the streets of Toronto in 1957, and one of the first Canadian feature films to be produced outside of Quebec. Producers William Davidson and Norman Klenman chose as their source a collection of short stories by Morley Callaghan that had been written in the 1930s known as Now That April’s Here (the four they selected to film did not include the title story: ‘Silk Stockings,’ ‘Rocking Chair,’ ‘The Rejected One’ and ‘A Sick Call’). The screenplay was written specifically as a feature, not as a series of short television dramas, with a common Toronto locale, and the filmmakers got the tacit support of producer/exhibitor Nat Taylor. It was released with some fanfare in the summer of 1958.

Raymond Massey provided the voice-over narration linking the four stories; however, the film was dismissed by Variety for its ‘amateurish production and acting values’ and it died at the box office.
