= All in Good Taste =

1983 film by Anthony Kramreither

- Directed by: Anthony Kramreither
- Written by: Robert C. Diez d'Aux; Rick Green; Anthony Kramreither
- Produced by: Anthony Kramreither
- Starring: Jim Carrey; Jonathan Welsh; Harvey Atkin; Jack Creley
- Cinematography: Dennis Miller
- Edited by: Robert C. Diez d'Aux
- Production company: Manesco Films
- Distributed by: Pan-Canadian Film Distributors
- Release date: May 6, 1983
- Running time: 85 minutes
- Country: Canada
- Language: English

All in Good Taste (originally known as It's All in Good Taste) is a Canadian comedy film produced in 1981, but not shown in theatres until 1983.

The film was produced, directed, and co-written by Anthony Kramreither, who was inspired by his own experience as a producer whose creative ambitions had been eclipsed by the commercial imperative to keep his Brightstar Pictures studio operating by making low-budget B-movies.

== Premise ==
The young filmmaker, Timothy (Jonathan Welsh), has a screenplay about an orphan and his dog who are in search of a loving family. Film investors force Timothy into making a movie with sex and violence.

== Role of Jim Carrey ==
Jim Carrey plays a small silent role as the naked cameraman Ralph Parker. After Carrey became a major international film star, however, subsequent video releases of the film emphasized him as its star over most of the actual main cast.
