= Flying (film) =

1986 Canadian film

- Theatrical release poster
- Directed by: Paul Lynch
- Written by: John Sheppard
- Produced by: Anthony Kramreither
- Starring: Olivia d'Abo; Rita Tushingham; Keanu Reeves
- Cinematography: Perci Young
- Edited by: Nick Rotundo
- Music by: Ollie E. Brown; Joe Curiale
- Distributed by: Golden Harvest
- Release date: 14 May 1986
- Running time: 95 minutes
- Country: Canada
- Language: English

Flying (also known as Dream to Believe, Teenage Dream, and Love at the Edge) is a 1986 Canadian drama film directed by Paul Lynch and starring Olivia d'Abo, Rita Tushingham, and Keanu Reeves.

== Plot ==
Robin is a teenage girl who is an assistant for her high school's gymnastics team, the Buffalo Flyers. She had been a competitor in the sport but was forced to stop competing after injuring her leg in the car accident which killed her father. Robin's mother, Marge, then married a man named Jack, who mistreats Robin. Robin continues to train in secret at an empty warehouse, supported by her friends, Roy (a bus driver) and Fred (a security guard).

At her new high school in Buffalo, New York, Robin catches the attention of a classmate named Tommy. He tries to ask out Robin multiple times but is unsuccessful, as Robin is interested in Mark, who is the boyfriend of Leah, Robin’s nasty teammate on the Flyers.

While assisting the Flyers, Robin is bullied by two gymnasts, Leah and Stacy, but becomes friends with another gymnast, Carly. After getting back into shape, Robin makes the team. Leah and Stacy then prank Robin into thinking that Mark likes her. Afterwards, Robin tries to talk to Tommy, but he has started to talk to other girls.

When an important regional gymnastics competition in Niagara Falls approaches, Robin is selected to compete. However, Marge dies, prompting Robin to move out of Jack's house. Robin and Tommy finally start a relationship with each other. He invites her to his house, where they have sex. With help from Carly and Tommy, Robin continues her gymnastics training.

At the regional competition, Robin is in second place behind Leah going into the final routines on floor. Jack appears at the meet. Still angry at Robin, he hits her until she is defended by Roy and Fred. Robin then performs a flawless routine, scoring a perfect 10 to win the competition.

== Cast ==
- Olivia d'Abo as Robin Crew
- Rita Tushingham as Jean Stoller
- Keanu Reeves as Tommy Warneki
- Jessica Steen as Carly Simmons
- Renee Murphy as Leah Kilbourne
- Sean McCann as Jack Crew
- Samantha Langevin as Marge Crew
- Nicole Kolman as Gillian Crew
- Samantha Logan as Stacy
- Anthony Kramreither Jr. as Mark Sanderson
- Denis Simpson as Fred Stoner
- Eugene Clark as Roy Teler
- Louis Tucci as Leo

== Production and release ==
Flying was one of the first film roles for both Olivia d'Abo and Keanu Reeves. Cynthia Rhodes reportedly served as a double for d'Abo.

Flying was first screened at the 1986 Cannes Film Festival. According to director Paul Lynch, the film had a very strong showing at the festival due to its release in the wake of similar and highly successful films such as Flashdance and Footloose. As a result, leading production company Golden Harvest turned down bids from numerous distributors in favor of releasing the film itself. According to Lynch, Golden Harvest lacked resources as a distributor, so the film's theatrical release was very limited. Sometime after the Canadian theatrical release, Flying was released on video in the United States by Cinema Group Home Video and in Canada by Cineplex Odeon. In the Philippines, the film was released as Love at the Edge on 10 December 1992, with advertisements that capitalized off of Reeves' Bill & Ted's Bogus Journey and Point Break fame.

Since Golden Harvest was a Hong Kong company, it never copyrighted Flying, so the film has been released on VHS and DVD from several different distributors and under several different titles.

== Soundtrack ==
Flying features songs by Stephanie Mills, Lynn Davis, and the Lydia Taylor Band. Members of the Lydia Taylor Band also appear in the film during the nightclub scenes. Ollie E. Brown composed most of the instrumental score and supervised the production of the songs with Russ Regan.

The Polydor soundtrack album listed in the film's end credits was never released.

The following is a list of songs featured in the film along with the artists who performed them.

- "Flying (Opening Titles)" - Stephanie Mills
- "Heart's Voice" - Stephanie Mills
- "The First Time" - Lynn Davis
- "Some Guys" - The Lydia Taylor Band
- "Bound To Your Love" - Meri D. Marshall
- "Baladoun" - Anyzette
- "Desire" - Robin Rountree, Bebe
- "I'm Working On It" - Bebe, Robin Rountree
- "Dancing Madly Backwards" - The Flirts
- "Radio Active (Fun, Fun, Fun)" - Deborah Gall
- "The Edge" - Ultimatum
- "It's Your Turn" - Lynn Davis
- "Death of the Night" - The Lydia Taylor Band
- "Champion (Easy Prey)" - Lipstick

The film also included the following instrumental tracks:

- "Working Out" - Ollie E. Brown
- "Robin's Theme" - Cathy Castellane
