= Martin Lavut =

Canadian filmmaker (1934–2016)

- Born: December 18, 1934; Montreal, Quebec, Canada
- Died: January 26, 2016 (aged 81); Toronto, Ontario, Canada
- Occupation: Filmmaker

Martin Lavut (December 18, 1934 – January 26, 2016) was a Canadian filmmaker born in Montreal, Quebec. He wrote and directed numerous theatrical and television dramas, and documentary films. Among his dramas are the films Certain Practices, War Brides, Charlie Grant's War and The Marriage Bed. His documentaries include At Home, Without a Hobby It's No Life, Orillia, and After Darwin. In 2006, he directed Remembering Arthur, a biography of filmmaker Arthur Lipsett.

In 2010, he completed a documentary about the eccentric portrait photographer Mike Disfarmer which premiered on TVOntario.

As a voice actor he is best known for his contributions to early Nelvana Limited films, such as The Devil and Daniel Mouse and its spin-off, Rock & Rule. He studied acting at California's Pasadena Playhouse, and New York's American Theatre Wing. He acted with Compass/Second City's Saint Louis Company. Lavut died in Toronto, Ontario, Canada.

== Filmography ==
Year	Title	Role	Notes
1961	The Mask	Michael Radin	
1979	Intergalactic Thanksgiving	Magic Mirror (voice)	
1981	Heavy Metal	Ard (voice)	Segment: "Den"
1983	Rock & Rule	Mylar / 2nd Radio Announcer (voices)	
1997	Pippi Longstocking	Mr. Settergren (voice)	
