= Remembering Arthur =

- Directed by: Martin Lavut
- Written by: Martin Lavut
- Produced by: Dennis Mohr
- Cinematography: Andrew Watt
- Edited by: Rob Ruzic
- Music by: Tutu Combo
- Release date: 2006
- Running time: 90 minutes
- Country: Canada
- Language: English

Remembering Arthur is a 2006 documentary film about collage filmmaker Arthur Lipsett that debuted at the Toronto International Film Festival. It is directed by Lipsett's close friend Martin Lavut and takes a personal approach to the story of his life through interviews with family, friends and colleagues. The film was produced by Public Pictures in association with the National Film Board of Canada, Bravo! and TVOntario.

In 2007, it won the "Best Cinematography in a Documentary" Award from the Canadian Society of Cinematographers.
