= Anthony Kramreither =

Austrian-Canadian actor, producer (1926–1993)

Anthony Kramreither (August 7, 1926 – February 8, 1993) was an Austrian-Canadian film and television actor and producer. Primarily known as a producer of low-budget horror and exploitation films such as Thrillkill, The Giant Spider Invasion and Humongous, he was most noted as producer of the 1986 film Dancing in the Dark, which was a Genie Award nominee for Best Picture at the 8th Genie Awards in 1987.

Originally from Vienna, Kramreither was a stage actor in Austria and Germany before moving to Canada in 1954. In Canada, he had television acting roles in series such as Wojeck, Quentin Durgens, M.P., R.C.M.P., Adventures in Rainbow Country and Seaway, and films such as Change of Mind, Silent Friends and Babysitters, before launching his own production company, Brightstar Films, in 1972.

With Brightstar, he aspired to make serious, artistically accomplished films; his first project was a television documentary series about Nobel Prize winners, and his second was the family film Lions for Breakfast. To make money for the firm, however, he also agreed to make several low-budget commercial horror films, which quickly came to define his studio's reputation and eclipse his original ambitions. In 1983, he produced, directed and cowrote the comedy film All in Good Taste, a deliberate parody of the gap between his own goals as a producer and the low-budget mass market compromises that he was forced to make; the film would also later become noted as one of the first-ever film roles for comedic actor Jim Carrey.

When Don Haig approached him for assistance in raising funds for Dancing in the Dark, he accepted the opportunity to move back into more serious filmmaking; with its screening at the Cannes Film Festival in 1986, it became the first Kramreither-produced film to premiere at a major film festival. Other more ambitious films he produced around the same time included Flying, Confidential, Dreams Beyond Memory and Concrete Angels.

In the late 1980s, he was diagnosed with Parkinson's disease. His final film as a producer was the 1991 film White Light, directed by Al Waxman; in the same year, he won a lifetime achievement award from the Canadian Film and Television Production Association.

He died on February 8, 1993, at his home in Richmond Hill.

== Filmography ==
He was a producer in all films unless otherwise noted.

=== Film ===
Year	Film	Credit	Notes
1975	Lions for Breakfast		
1976	A Sweeter Song	Executive producer	
1977	Deadly Harvest		
1982	Humongous		
1983	American Nightmare	Executive producer	
1983	All in Good Taste		
1984	Thrillkill		
1985	Mark of Cain		
1986	A Judgment in Stone	Associate producer	
1986	Flying		
1986	Dancing in the Dark		
1986	Twin Dragon Encounter	Executive producer	
1986	Confidential		
1987	Concrete Angels		
1987	Dreams Beyond Memory		
1988	The Brain		
1989	Freakshow		
1989	Mob Story	Executive producer	
1991	White Light		Final film as a producer

As an actor

Year	Film	Role
1969	Change of Mind	Dr. Bornear
1969	Silent Friends	—
1969	Babysitters	Carlo
1971	The Reincarnate	Van Broeck
1981	The Amateur	TV Director

As director

Year	Film
1983	All in Good Taste
1984	Thrillkill

As writer

Year	Film
1983	All in Good Taste

Miscellaneous crew

Year	Film	Role
1983	All in Good Taste	Assistant gopher

=== Television ===
As an actor

Year	Title	Role	Notes
1958	Cannonball	Koslenko	
1958	Folio	Brion	
1958−59	The Unforeseen	Hornung	
1959	Hudson's Bay	Hans Huber	
1959−60	R.C.M.P.	Victor Raskob Mike Holowchuk	
1960	Festival	—	
1960−61	Encounter	SS Man	
1963	Scarlett Hill	Dr. Spangle	
1963−65	The Forest Rangers	Merv Wild Man Karl Hauptmann	
1965−66	Seaway	Captain Kristatos Meiningen Barsky	
1969	Adventures in Rainbow Country	Miroslav	
1971	Heißer Sand	George Howard	Television film
1971	Augenzeugen müssen blind sein	Boy Harloff	Television film
1980	Matt and Jenny	Franz Von Poppel	
