= 1976 Toronto International Film Festival =

Annual Canadian film festival

- Festival poster
- Opening film: Cousin Cousine
- Closing film: Queen of the Gypsies
- Location: Toronto, Ontario, Canada
- Hosted by: Toronto International Film Festival Group
- No. of films: 127 feature films
- Festival date: October 18, 1976–October 24, 1976
- Language: English
- Website: tiff.net
- 1977 —

The 1st Toronto International Film Festival (TIFF) took place at Windsor Arms Hotel, Toronto, Ontario, Canada between October 18 and October 24, 1976. Initially its name was Festival of Festivals, which remained until 1994 after which it became the Toronto International Film Festival.

It showcased 127 feature films from 30 countries with the audience of 35,000. It featured some of the best films from film festivals around the world. Most of the Hollywood studios later withdrew their submissions citing the reason that Toronto audiences would be too parochial for their films.

Cousin Cousine, a French film directed by Jean-Charles Tacchella was selected as the opening film and screened at Ontario Place Cinesphere and Queen of the Gypsies was the closing film. German cinema was focused upon, with films from German directors such as Rainer Werner Fassbinder, Wim Wenders and Werner Herzog.

Producer Dino De Laurentiis, screened a 90-second preview of his then-unreleased King Kong at the festival.

== Programme ==
=== Gala Presentation ===
English title	Original title	Director(s)	Production country
Cousin Cousine		Jean-Charles Tacchella	France
Illustrious Corpses	Cadaveri eccellenti	Francesco Rosi	Italy, France
Death Race 2000		Paul Bartel	United States
Gypsies Are Found Near Heaven	Табор уходит в небо	Emil Loteanu	Soviet Union
Lumière		Jeanne Moreau	France, Italy
Dersu Uzala		Akira Kurosawa	Soviet Union, Japan
Adoption	Örökbefogadás	Márta Mészáros	Hungary
Mother Küsters' Trip to Heaven	Mutter Küsters' Fahrt zum Himmel	Rainer Werner Fassbinder	West Germany
The Devil's Playground		Fred Schepisi	Australia
Bernice Bobs Her Hair		Joan Micklin Silver	United States
The Best Way to Walk	La meilleure façon de marcher	Claude Miller	France
Kings of the Road	Im Lauf der Zeit	Wim Wenders	West Germany
Heart of Glass	Herz aus Glas	Werner Herzog	West Germany
Wellspring of My World	Herfra min verden går	Christian Braad Thomsen	Denmark
Wives	Hustruer	Anja Breien	Norway
Cantata de Chile		Humberto Solás	Cuba
Submission	Scandalo	Salvatore Samperi	Italy
Harvest: 3,000 Years	ምርት ሦስት ሺህ ዓመት	Haile Gerima	Ethiopia
Independence Day		Bobby Roth	United States

=== Canadian Cinema ===
The Canadian Cinema program had been slated to include Don Owen's film Partners, but it was pulled from the festival at the last minute after a dispute with the Ontario Censor Board about a brief sex scene in the film.

English title	Original title	Director(s)	Production country
The Absence	L'Absence	Brigitte Sauriol	Canada
Before the Time Comes	Le temps de l'avant	Anne Claire Poirier	Canada
The Little Girl Who Lives Down the Lane		Nicolas Gessner	France, Canada
Love at First Sight		Rex Bromfield	Canada
A Pacemaker and a Sidecar	L'Eau chaude, l'eau frette	André Forcier	Canada
The Supreme Kid		Peter Bryant	Canada

=== Documentaries ===
English title	Original title	Director(s)	Production country
At 99: A Portrait of Louise Tandy Murch		Deepa Mehta	Canada
Grey Gardens		Albert Maysles, David Maysles, Ellen Hovde, Muffie Meyer	United States
Harlan County, USA		Barbara Kopple	United States
Hollywood on Trial		David Helpern	United States
Not a Pretty Picture		Martha Coolidge	United States
