= A Cosmic Christmas =

1977 animated television special directed by Clive A. Smith

- The film's artwork poster
- Screenplay by: Ida Nelson; Laura Paull
- Story by: Patrick Loubert
- Directed by: Clive A. Smith
- Starring: Joey Davidson; Martin Lavut; Patrick Moffatt; Nick Nichols
- Music by: Sylvia Tyson
- Country of origin: Canada
- Original language: English

Production
- Executive producer: Jeffrey Kirsch
- Producers: Michael Hirsh; Patrick Loubert
- Running time: 26 minutes
- Production company: Nelvana
- Budget: C$275,000

Original release
- Network: CBC Television
- Release: 4 December 1977

Related
- The Devil and Daniel Mouse (1978)

A Cosmic Christmas is a Canadian Christmas animated television special, premiering on CBC in Canada and in syndication in the United States on 4 December 1977. It was the first television special produced by Toronto's Nelvana company.

== Plot ==
A scene from the film.

Three aliens from an unknown planet, a Biblical Magi allusion, visit Earth to know the true meaning of Christmas. Peter, a young boy, and Lucy, his goose, are the first to encounter them. Unable to find the true meaning of Christmas in town, Peter takes them to his family's house in the woods. While Peter's grandmother tells the aliens about her memories of Christmas, Marvin, one of the town's bullies, steals Lucy. In the chase to rescue Lucy, Marvin falls through the ice in a lake. Peter attempts to rescue him but falls into the lake as well. The townsfolk, who were out searching for the aliens, attempt to save the boys but their human chain is not long enough to reach them. The three aliens, who had sworn not to interfere with events on Earth, decide to help in order to learn the meaning of Christmas. The rescue effort is successful. The townsfolk are quick to condemn Marvin for stealing Lucy, but have a change of heart when Peter's grandmother suggests he did so because he had nothing to eat. Peter offers Marvin and his friends the chance to join them for Christmas dinner and the aliens realize that family and the spirit of forgiveness are the true meaning of Christmas.

== Cast ==
- Joey Davidson ... Peter
- Martin Lavut ... Dad, Plutox, Santa Joe
- Richard M. Davidson ... Lexicon (as Richard Davidson)
- Duncan Regehr ... Amalthor
- Patricia Moffatt ... Mom
- Jane Mallett ... Grandma
- Marvin Goldhar ... Chief Snerk
- Greg Rogers ... Marvin
- Chris Wiggins ... Mayor Thimbly
- Nick Nichols ... Townie
- Marian Waldman ... Townie

== Production ==
A Cosmic Christmas is the first installment in the 1977–1980 series of television specials produced by Nelvana Ltd. The first animated work from the studio, it was also their most expensive project at the time, costing C$275,000. The special spent 2 1/2 years in development, and four months in production; 24 artists and 30,000–40,000 drawings were involved.

== Release ==
The special premiered on 4 December 1977 on CBC Television, and was syndicated by U.S. company Viacom; it was later submitted for the Best Animated Short Academy Award. It was later released onto videocassette by Warner Home Video in the early 1980s as part of the Nelvanamation (Volume 1) VHS release. It was later released onto a budget VHS from Diamond Entertainment. Both of these releases are out of print and there are no plans to release it on DVD.

== In other media ==
The animated special was spoofed by RiffTrax on 20 December 2024.

== See also ==
- List of Christmas films
