= Lions for Breakfast =

- Directed by: William Davidson
- Written by: Martin Lager
- Produced by: Anthony Kramreither
- Starring: Jim Henshaw; Danny Forbes; Jan Rubeš; Susan Petrie
- Cinematography: Robert Brooks
- Edited by: Tony Lower
- Music by: Cliff Edward
- Production company: Burg Productions
- Release date: May 7, 1975
- Running time: 103 minutes
- Country: Canada
- Language: English

Lions for Breakfast is a Canadian family drama film, directed by William Davidson and released in 1975. The film centres on two brothers, 22-year old Trick (Jim Henshaw) and ten-year-old Zanny (Danny Forbes), who are on a bus trip to find a new place to live after the death of their parents. The supporting cast includes Jan Rubeš as Ivan, an older drifter the brothers connect with on the trip; Susan Petrie as Jenny, a young woman who becomes a love interest for Trick; and Paul Bradley as Charlie, a garage attendant.

The film premiered on May 7, 1975 at the Guelph Spring Festival.

It was a Canadian Film Award nominee for Best Picture at the 26th Canadian Film Awards, but did not win. It won the Canadian Film Award for Best Musical Score.

The film was broadcast by CBC Television on the CBC Film Festival series in 1980.

== Critical response ==
Bryan Johnson of The Globe and Mail gave the film a negative review, writing that "all it has going for it are its good intentions and the eager sincerity of the people behind it. And while that's enough to make you wish it were better, it's not nearly enough so you can pretend that it is." Stephen Chesley of Cinema Canada reviewed it more favourably, opining that "there's nothing flashy about the film, nor should there be: by proceeding in a straightforward line the creators have achieved exactly what they set out to do, and they've done it without resorting to too many cliches or to depressing cuteness."
