= Wayne Gilbert =

Canadian animator

Wayne Gilbert is a Canadian animator. He has led animation projects at Vancouver Institute of Media Arts (VanArts), EA Black Box, Industrial Light & Magic, Wang Films, and Disney Canada Studios. Gilbert graduated from Sheridan College's Classical Animation Program and has an MFA (Master of Film and Animation) USA accreditation.

== Works ==
=== Short films ===
- "Bottoms Up"
- "Traffic Jam"
- "CPU"
- "Let Go"

=== Books ===
- Simplified Drawing for Planning Animation
- Planning Character Animation
