= Love at First Sight (1976 film) =

- Directed by: Rex Bromfield
- Written by: Rex Bromfield
- Produced by: Peter O'Brian
- Starring: Dan Aykroyd; Mary Ann McDonald; Jane Mallett; George Murray
- Cinematography: Henry Fiks
- Edited by: Alan Collins
- Music by: Roy Payne
- Production company: Quadrant Films
- Distributed by: Astral Films
- Release date: October 1976 (Toronto)
- Running time: 85 minutes
- Country: Canada
- Language: English

Love at First Sight is a 1976 Canadian romantic comedy film directed by Rex Bromfield.

== Synopsis ==
A young woman, Shirley (Mary Ann McDonald), and a clumsy blind man named Roy (Dan Aykroyd) flee to Niagara Falls to open a restaurant with money given to them by Shirley's grandmother (Jane Mallett), after Shirley's controlling and unpleasant father Frank (George Murray) objects to their relationship.

== Production ==
The film was an expansion of a 30-minute short film of the same title that Bromfield had released in 1974, and which was aired by CBC Television in 1975 on its short film series Sprockets. However, because the original 1974 short film received little detailed coverage apart from a few brief notices of its screenings, some sources have erroneously labelled the feature version as a 1974 film.

The theme song was "Do You Believe in Love at First Sight", written by Ron Roker, Gerry Shury, Chris Rea and Frank McDonald, and recorded by Dionne Warwick. The song had been performed a year earlier by Polly Brown.

== Distribution ==
The film was screened at the 1976 Cannes Film Market, and had its public premiere at the 1976 Festival of Festivals, before going into commercial release in 1977.

== Reception ==
Michael Walsh of The Province wrote that "unfortunately, the extended version has the look of a padded-out revue skit. Its characters, including an effeminate pet store proprietor played by a bewigged Barry Morse, are overdrawn caricatures. The plot, in which grandma finances the lovers' flight to Niagara Falls, is a patchwork of grafted-on gags. To his credit, Bromfield creates some genuinely funny (you should pardon the expression) sight gags. Indeed, I laughed harder at his film than at Feldman's big-budget Beau Geste parody. On the other hand, he fails to follow through on some of his more elaborate constructions. The china shop sequence, for example, ends much too abruptly, an example of cinematic destructis interuptus that is guaranteed to leave his audience unsatisfied."

Ken Cuthbertson of the Regina Leader-Post reviewed the film more positively, writing that "it comes as a pleasant surprise to discover that writer-director Rex Bromfield chose not to make a ribald or black comedy about blindness. He avoided the obvious and the exploitative and as a result has made a funny but wonderfully understated comedy."
