= Ford: The Man and the Machine =

- DVD poster
- Based on: Ford: The Men and the Machine by Robert Lacey
- Screenplay by: Robert Hamilton
- Directed by: Allan Eastman
- Starring: Cliff Robertson
- Theme music composer: Paul Zaza
- Countries of origin: United States; Canada
- Original language: English

Production
- Executive producer: Alex Winitsky
- Producer: David J. Patterson
- Cinematography: Thomas Burstyn
- Editor: George Roulston
- Running time: 192 minutes
- Production companies: Filmline International; RHI Entertainment

Original release
- Release: May 11, 1987

Ford: The Man and the Machine is a 1987 Canadian-American television film directed by Allan Eastman and starring Cliff Robertson as Henry Ford. It is based on Robert Lacey's biography about Ford. The film won three Gemini Awards for Best Dramatic Miniseries, Best Production Design or Art Direction and Best Costume Design and was nominated for three others for Best Supporting Actor (R. H. Thomson), Best Supporting Actress (Heather Thomas) and Best Sound.

== Cast ==
- Cliff Robertson as Henry Ford
- Hope Lange as Clara Ford
- Heather Thomas as Evangeline Cote
- R. H. Thomson as Edsel Ford
- Chas Lawther as Connors
- Michael Ironside as Harry Bennett
