= Greg Rogers (actor) =

Canadian actor (born 1951)

- Born: March 12, 1951 (age 75); Saint John, New Brunswick, Canada
- Occupations: Actor; radio producer
- Years active: 1970s–present

Greg Rogers (born 12 March 1951) is a Canadian actor and former radio drama producer. Based for much of his early career in Calgary and Edmonton, Alberta, before relocating to British Columbia, Rogers has worked as a stage, radio, and screen performer since the early 1970s. His television and film credits include guest and supporting roles on The X-Files, Highlander: The Series, The Outer Limits, and the science-fiction series Caprica, as well as a recurring role as Councilman Kullens on Arrow.

== Early life ==
Rogers was born on 12 March 1951 at the Evangeline Home, a maternity facility for unmarried mothers in Saint John, New Brunswick. He has said he met his biological father only once. His mother, Leona (Livingston) Rogers (1933–2011), later married Charles "Chuck" Rogers, whose surname Rogers adopted as his stepfather. He has a half-sister, Cindy-Lee Rogers, and a half-brother, Shawn Rogers.

Rogers attended nine schools in Saint John before his family relocated to Burlington, Ontario when he was fifteen, after his stepfather found work there.

== Career ==
=== Theatre and radio ===
Rogers began performing on Canadian stages in the early 1970s, including a production of John Herbert's Fortune and Men's Eyes in Buffalo, New York, in which he played the role of Rocky.

By the early 1980s Rogers was based in Calgary, working as an actor and director and serving as associate director of the Citadel Theatre in Edmonton. In May 1983 he became drama producer for the CBC radio network's Calgary-based operations, overseeing productions including a radio adaptation of Sharon Pollock's Whiskey Six and a dramatization of Donald B. Smith's biography of Sylvester Long broadcast on Peter Gzowski's CBC morning programme. A contemporary profile of the Alberta acting scene in Cinema Canada described Rogers as "already a busy actor" when he took the post, and listed him among the cast of Bush Pilots, a three-part pilot for pay television.

Rogers continued to work on Calgary stages through the mid-to-late 1980s, including a role in a 1984 production of André Roussin's Nina at the Glenmore Dinner Theatre, a 1987 stint as an adjudicator for the Alberta Drama Festival Association's provincial one-act play festival in Red Deer, and directing Scrooge — The Female Version at Glenmore Dinner Theatre later that year.

After relocating to the Steveston area of Richmond, British Columbia, around 1989, Rogers directed a 1992 Vancouver production of Fortune and Men's Eyes — the same play in which he had appeared two decades earlier. In 1996 he starred opposite Julian Fargey in Willy Russell's Educating Rita for a Jupiter Theatre production in Vernon, British Columbia.

=== Television and film ===
Rogers appeared in numerous Vancouver-shot Canadian television series from the late 1980s onward, including Lonesome Dove, Neon Rider, The Commish, 21 Jump Street, Danger Bay, Max Glick, Northwood, Bordertown, and Sliders.

In 1995 he appeared as defense attorney Daniel Charez in The X-Files episode "The List," and had guest roles on Highlander: The Series and The Outer Limits. He also appeared opposite Sam Elliott in the film Final Cut and opposite Graham Greene in Wounded.

Rogers' later screen credits include a guest appearance as a businessman in the science-fiction series Caprica (2010), a prequel to the re-imagined Battlestar Galactica, and a recurring role as Councilman Kullens on Arrow, which he played across five episodes between 2016 and 2019.

== Personal life ==
As of 1998 Rogers was a member of the Union of British Columbia Performers and the Canadian Actors' Equity Association. He has also worked as a writer, co-writing an original screenplay, The Vault, based on his own theory about an unsolved 1977 robbery. Rogers later moved from Steveston to Coquitlam.

== Filmography ==
=== Television ===
Year	Title	Role	Notes
1995	The X-Files	Daniel Charez	Episode: "The List"
1995	Highlander: The Series	Detective Sheridan	Episode: "Leader of the Pack"
1996	The Sentinel	Don Haas	1 episode
2000	The Outer Limits	Reverend Samuel Garland	Episode: "Revival"
2000	Special Delivery	Charlie Zwick	Television film
2001	Mysterious Ways	Richard Beech	Episode: "John Doe No. 28"
2001	Cold Squad	—	2 episodes
2003	Behind the Camera: The Unauthorized Story of 'Three's Company'	CBC Executive #1	Television film
2004	The Days	Bart Flack	2 episodes
2005	Ladies Night	Banker	Television film
2006	The Suspect	Phil Gold	
2006	Memory	Dr. Costas	
2008	Making Mr. Right	Angelo	Television film
2009	The Thaw	Webcam Voice	Voice role
2010	Caprica	Businessman	Episode: "Unvanquished"
2016–2019	Arrow	Councilman Kullens	5 episodes
2017	Miss Christmas	—	Television film
2020	Cranberry Christmas	—	Television film
2021	A Dickens of a Holiday!	—	Television film
2022	The Wedding Veil	—	Television film
2023–2024	The Dragon Prince	Kpp'Ar	Voice role; 2 episodes
2024	Christmas with the Singhs	Jake Sr.	Television film

=== Film ===
Year	Title	Role	Notes
2004	Riding the Bullet	Businessman Selling Cadillac	
2012	The Possession	Dr. Walterson	
2022	Undeveloped	Paul	Short film

=== Video games ===
Year	Title	Role	Notes
2024	Star Wars Outlaws	—	Voice
