= The Devil and Daniel Mouse =

1978 television special directed by Clive A. Smith

- Album cover
- Genre: Animation; Family; Fantasy; Musical
- Based on: The Devil and Daniel Webster by Stephen Vincent Benét
- Screenplay by: Ken Sobol
- Story by: Stephen Vincent Benét; Patrick Loubert
- Directed by: Clive A. Smith
- Starring: Jim Henshaw; Annabel Kershaw; Chris Wiggins; John Sebastian
- Music by: John Sebastian; Patricia Cullen; Valerie Carter; Reggie Knighton
- Country of origin: Canada
- Original language: English

Production
- Executive producer: Jeffrey Kirsch
- Producers: Michael Hirsh; Patrick Loubert; J. Gordon Arnold; Ron Hastings
- Running time: 25 minutes
- Production companies: Nelvana Limited; Canadian Broadcasting Corporation

Original release
- Network: CBC
- Release: October 5, 1978

The Devil and Daniel Mouse is a 1978 Canadian animated Halloween television special, based on the 1936 short tale The Devil and Daniel Webster by Stephen Vincent Benét. The Devil and Daniel Mouse is the second television special produced by the Canada-based studio firm Nelvana Limited.

Nelvana's iconic polar bear logo made its first appearance at the end of the special. The polar bear was eventually used as an in-credit logo later in their specials from 1979 to 1980 and from after 1980 to 1988.

== Plot ==
Two struggling mouse folk musicians, Daniel and Jan, are fired from their latest gig because their music is deemed too old-fashioned and not with the times. While Daniel goes to pawn off his guitar, Jan declares that she would give anything to be a big star. She is approached by a shifty reptilian character in a white suit who introduces himself as "B.L. Zebub", a record producer.

He and his weasel assistant, Weez Weezel, offer her fame and fortune in exchange for signing a contract in her own blood. Jan does not read the fine print and trusts B.L., signing herself over to his record production company. Little does she know that B.L. is none other than the devil himself, and at midnight at the height of her fame, he will return to collect her soul. To assist her, Weez conjures three band members from thin air, a rabbit (Rabbit Delight), a beaver (Boom Boom Beaver), and a praying mantis (Pray Mantis).

As the lead singer of "Funky Jan and the Animal Kingdom", Jan is soon the most popular rock star on the planet, while Daniel is left out in the cold. When B.L. comes for her soul, a distraught Jan goes to Daniel for help. A trial is held in the woods over Jan's soul, with Weez as the judge, a jury of ghosts of shady music industry creatures, and Daniel acting as Jan's attorney. As an additional stipulation, the Devil states that should Daniel lose the trial, his soul, as well as Jan's, will be taken as payment.

At first, the trial seems hopeless, considering Daniel has no education as a lawyer and cannot present even the beginnings of a reasonable argument to release Jan. Having nothing else to offer, Daniel begins to sing a heartfelt song. Jan joins in, as do her three heretofore unhelpful band members. The other animals watching the trial begin to sing and clap along to the tune along with Weez and the rigged jury. Enraged, the Devil attempts to summon forth demons to stop the heroes, but the spirits he conjures also fall prey to the sway of Daniel's music. Weez declares that Dan and Jan have won their case and the jury agrees.

A frustrated Devil finally leaves, returning to Hell and taking Weez and all of his other minions with him. The two mice embrace one another as the film ends. The final frame repeats the story's moral: "A song from the heart beats the Devil every time."

== Cast ==
- Annabel Kershaw as Jan Mouse
  - Valerie Carter, credited as "Lauren Runn", provides Jan's singing voice.
- Jim Henshaw as Daniel Mouse
  - John Sebastian provides Daniel's singing voice and voices a rock emcee.
- Chris Wiggins as B.L. Zebub
- Martin Lavut as Weez Weezel, a nightclub owner, and a pawnbroker
- Dianne Lawrence as an interviewer

== Songs ==
- Look Where the Music Can Take You performed by John Sebastian & Valerie Carter (credited as Laurel Runn)
- I've Got a Song to Sing performed by Valerie Carter (credited as Laurel Runn)
- Roxy Marathon Concert Medley performed by Valerie Carter (credited as Laurel Runn)
- Can You Help Me Find My Song? performed by Valerie Carter (credited as Laurel Runn)
- Look Where the Music Can Take You performed by John Sebastian & Valerie Carter (credited as Laurel Runn)
- Look Where the Music Can Take You (Finale) performed by John Sebastian & Valerie Carter (credited as Laurel Runn)

== Merchandising ==
=== Nelvana story album ===
A tie-in story LP record was released by Nelvana Records in 1978.' Narrated by John Sebastian, the album features dialog lifted straight from the film's soundtrack as well as songs performed by Sebastian, Valerie Carter (credited as Laurel Runn) and the Reggie Knighton Band. As in the film, the dialogue is interspersed with several of the songs.

=== Full-colour storybook ===
First published by Avon/Camelot in 1979, the storybook was written by screenwriter Ken Sobol and features music and lyrics for three John Sebastian penned songs (I've Got a Song, Can You Help Me Find My Song? and Look Where the Music Can Take You). Simplified for younger readers, many of the visual gags and a few scenes were omitted from the book.

== Home video ==
The Devil and Daniel Mouse was simultaneously issued as a stand-alone title on Betamax and VHS as well as featured on several compilations of Nelvana's TV specials.

=== Nelvanamation (Volume 1) ===
The first and more widely available compilation to feature the film was Nelvanamation (Volume 1). Also featured on this video are Romie-0 and Julie-8, Intergalactic Thanksgiving and A Cosmic Christmas.

=== The Devil and Daniel Mouse and Tales of Fantasy and Science Fiction ===
Headlining a collection similar to Nelvanamation, this CED Videodisc also includes Romie-0 and Julie-8, Easter Fever, Intergalactic Thanksgiving and A Cosmic Christmas.

=== Rock & Rule ===
The Devil and Daniel Mouse became the inspiration for Nelvana's first feature film, Rock & Rule. The film and How We Made the Devil and Daniel Mouse, a vintage "making of" documentary, were both included on the two-DVD and Blu-ray versions of that film in a slightly edited form of 22 minutes from its original 25-minute running time.

== See also ==
- 1978 in television
- Canadian animation
