= Nelvana =

Canadian animation studio and entertainment company

Nelvana Limited
- Logo used since October 19, 2016
- Type: Subsidiary
- Traded as: TSE: NTV (1994–2000); Nasdaq: NELV (2000)
- Industry: Animation; Franchise licensing; Children's entertainment
- Predecessor: Laff Arts
- Founded: July 30, 1971; 55 years ago
- Founders: Michael Hirsh; Patrick Loubert; Clive A. Smith
- Headquarters: Corus Quay, Toronto, Ontario, Canada
- Area served: Worldwide
- Key people: Rachel Nelson (vice president and head of Corus Studios, Nelvana & Kids Can Press)
- Products: Consisting mainly of children's animation; see also list of Nelvana programs
- Revenue: C$600 million (2001)
- Number of employees: 200+ (2021)
- Parent: Corus Entertainment (2000–present)
- Website: www.nelvana.com

Nelvana Limited (/nɛlˈvɑːnə/; also known as Nelvana Studio, Nelvana Enterprises, Nelvana International or Nelvana Digital; commonly known as Nelvana; stylized nelvana in all lowercase) is a Canadian animation studio and entertainment production company owned by Corus Entertainment since 2000. Founded in 1971 by Michael Hirsh, Patrick Loubert, and Clive A. Smith, it was named after Nelvana of the Northern Lights, the first Canadian national superhero, who was created by Adrian Dingle. The company's production logo is a polar bear looking at Polaris, the North Star.

The company is based in Toronto, Ontario, Canada, and it maintained international offices in France, Ireland, and Japan, as well as smaller offices in the top three cities in the United States. Many of its films, shows and specials were based on licensed properties and literature, but original programming was also part of its roster. Although the company specializes in children's media, Nelvana has also co-produced adult animation such as Rock and Rule, John Callahan's Quads!, (Note: Australian co-production with SBS Independent and Media World Features) Clone High, (Note: Season 1 only, American co-production with MTV, produced by Nelvana and Touchstone Television while animated by Rough Draft Studios) Bob & Margaret, (Note: International co-production with Global Television Network, United Kingdom co-production with Channel 4 for seasons 1–2 of the London era, then, Republic of the Philippines co-production while animated by Philippine Animation Studio Inc. for seasons 3–4 of the Toronto era) Family Dog, (Note: American co-production with Amblin Television, Tim Burton Productions and Universal Television.) Delta State, Robin and Committed. (Note: Republic of the Philippines co-production while being animated by Philippine Animation Studio Inc.)

Nelvana International distributes five shows―Taina, the first five seasons of The Fairly OddParents, (Note: Produced by Nickelodeon, who handle all US rights) The Backyardigans, (Note: Co-production with Nick Jr., Nickelodeon handles all rights in the United States) Mr. Young and Horrid Henry (Note: International distribution for season 1 only, produced in the United Kingdom by Novel Entertainment) from 2007–2008. As of 2001, its library comprised more than 1,650 cumulative half-hours of original programming.

== History ==
=== Laff Arts ===
Michael Hirsh and Patrick Loubert first met as friends and partners at York University, Canada in 1967. They made films with other students. This was Loubert's first experience with filming; he recalled:

I had been hitchhiking in Europe during the previous summer, and I got a ride with an Italian film director visiting locations. I hadn't heard of him. When I got home I looked up his films – it was Gillo Pontecorvo, a brilliant political filmmaker who had directed The Battle of Algiers. That was the beginning for me.

The fledgling Canadian television and film industry was developing at the time. Loubert, Hirsh, and York University friends Jack Christie and Peter Dewdney founded a small company named Laff Arts that produced small experimental films. They were joined by Vitaphone animator-designer Clive A. Smith in Toronto, Ontario; Smith's interest was in rock n' roll music, and helped produce the Beatles' animated series and 1968 film Yellow Submarine before moving to Canada to work on short films and commercials.

Smith designed the company's business card; on the front was a suited businessman, and inside was the businessman with the pants down. The company was dissolved after an ad agency advised them that the company's name was unprofessional.

=== Nelvana ===
Nelvana's mascot, the polar bear, which first appeared in The Devil and Daniel Mouse (1978)

Nelvana was founded by Hirsh, Loubert, and Smith in 1971. Hirsh recalls:

At the time, there was no production industry per se in Canada, either in animation or in television production. There were stations making local shows, but you didn't have people making programs for sale around the world. So, blissfully unaware of all it would involve, we decided to start a company in Toronto.

They bought ownership rights to a collection of local comic books from the 1940s and then produced a half-hour television documentary focused on Canadian comics for the Canadian Broadcasting Corporation (CBC). Their two-year travelling tour of the art from the National Gallery of Canada, "Comic Art Traditions in Canada, 1941–45", gave locals a chance to revisit the country's past heritage in that field. Meanwhile, Hirsh and Loubert collaborated on a related primer from Peter Martin and Associates, The Great Canadian Comic Books. During this time the new company was named Nelvana after World War II-era Canadian comic book superheroine Nelvana of the Northern Lights.

A derelict apartment in downtown Toronto served as the company's first building, and a homemade wooden stand mounted over a toilet was among its first camera equipment. To create zooms, Hirsh recalled of his early experience with this machine, "we would pile up phone books under the art work." During their first year and a half, the trio lived off a superfluous Chargex credit card that Loubert received at university, spending up to C$7,500 on it before they reclaimed double that cost as their first ever transaction. Under those conditions, Nelvana was involved in the production of documentaries and live-action films during the early 1970s. In the area of part-time animation work, they made ten C$1,500 fillers for the CBC.

Among the studio's first productions was a low-budget CBC short subject series, Small Star Cinema, which combined live-action and animation to tell stories of ordinary life from a child's point of view. It was followed by Nelvana's first ever television special Christmas Two Step in 1975, a similarly styled special in which a girl tries to be a lead dancer at a Christmas pageant. In the same year, he produced Mr. Pencil Draws The Line. When Nelvana was founded in 1971, their original goal was to make live-action programs involving animation in them during their early days.

Nelvana worked on their first television specials: A Cosmic Christmas (1977), The Devil and Daniel Mouse (1978), Romie-0 and Julie-8 (1979), Please Don't Eat the Planet (better known by its subtitle, Intergalactic Thanksgiving) (1979), Easter Fever (1980) and Take Me Up to the Ball Game (1980). During that time, George Lucas, who was impressed with A Cosmic Christmas, commissioned the company to work on a 10-minute sequence for the CBS and CTV TV film Star Wars Holiday Special in 1978. This short scene, officially entitled "The Faithful Wookiee", features the voices of Harrison Ford, Mark Hamill, Carrie Fisher, Anthony Daniels, and James Earl Jones, and introduced the bounty hunter Boba Fett.

=== 1980s ===
At the beginning of the 1980s, Nelvana chose to co-produce its first feature film, Rock & Rule, over working on Heavy Metal, internationally-produced animated science fiction anthology. Rock & Rule was inspired by The Devil and Daniel Mouse, took five years to produce and cost $8 million, using all of the studio's resources. The film was released by MGM/UA in 1983 with little promotion in the U.S. and was a financial failure. The company survived by working full-time on children's television series. These included its first three live-action franchises (The Edison Twins, 20 Minute Workout and Mr. Microchip), the first season of Inspector Gadget with DIC Entertainment, and the pilot episode of The Get Along Gang.

Early in the decade, the company worked on four television specials based on American Greetings properties. They were The Magic of Herself the Elf, based on Mattel's toy line; Strawberry Shortcake: Housewarming Surprise; Strawberry Shortcake and the Baby Without a Name; and Strawberry Shortcake Meets the Berrykins, the last three of which featured the eponymous doll. There were two shows made by Nelvana based on the AmToy properties, Madballs and My Pet Monster.

Despite the successes of their earlier works, perhaps its greatest success at the time came in the form of the Care Bears, thanks to its acquisition of the character rights from American Greetings, the franchise owners. In early 1985, the first film based on the toy line turned the company's assets around, grossing US$23 million in the U.S., and another $1.5 million in its native Canada. Its tremendous success gave way to two more feature films, A New Generation and Adventure in Wonderland, as well as a television series.

In the area of science fiction, Nelvana co-produced Droids and Ewoks, two Saturday-morning series based on Star Wars. At one point, there was talk of an animated CBS show from the studio, based on the BBC's Doctor Who; the plan never came to fruition, but concept art was created by Ted Bastien. The series would have been Nelvana's biggest to date. According to Bastien, "it was pulled out from under us" after a British animation studio told the BBC that it could do what Nelvana intended for a much lower price. The project did not proceed further, and no pilot was produced.

For Orion Pictures' 1986 live-action western comedy, Three Amigos, the company made use of lip-sync animation for a musical sequence in which the main characters sing a song at a campfire, with their horses singing along. In 1987, Michael Hirsh co-produced Nelvana's first self-made film of this calibre, the comedy feature Burglar, which was the first live-action feature film the company had ever co-produced.

Also in 1987, the company, along with independent filmmaker Pierre David, film, video, and television production company Malofilm Group, and home video distributor New Star Entertainment, formed Image Organization, an independent production company that mainly specialized in the thriller genre and tied itself to over 100 films in the international market by 1996. Nelvana and New Star would sell their shares in the company to David and Malofilm in 1989.

In 1988, Nelvana and Scholastic Productions co-produced a video series of The Video Adventures of Clifford the Big Red Dog based on the 1962 book. It was also distributed by Family Home Entertainment on the video releases.

The company's fourth live-action series, T. and T., premiered in 1988 on Canada's Global network. The show's titular duo was Mr. T of A-Team fame, playing a former boxer named T.S. Turner, and Canadian actress Kristina Nicoll as an East Coast lawyer by the name of Terri Taler. Nelvana faced bankruptcy for the second time when the show's original U.S. distributor, Qintex Entertainment (formerly Hal Roach Studios) was going out of business; in six weeks, they were saved when they found a replacement. Also that year, Nelvana established BearSpots, a facility for producing television commercials that lasted until 1993.

As the decade came to a close, the revived Nelvana had its next big success with a film and an HBO television show based on Jean de Brunhoff's Babar book series. This franchise, its first international co-production, won many ACE Awards in the U.S. and Geminis in Canada. In September 1989, ABC began to air Beetlejuice, a show co-produced by Nelvana and based on the film by Tim Burton.

=== 1990s ===
Following Babar's success, the studio acquired the rights to animated series based on Hergé's The Adventures of Tintin, Maurice Sendak's Little Bear, Joanna Cole and Bruce Degen's The Magic School Bus and the British comic strip Rupert Bear. Nelvana had self-made successes of its own during the 1990s, such as Eek! The Cat, Dog City (with Jim Henson Productions) and Ned's Newt (with TMO Film GmBH). Less successful was its animated series for children, Roseanne Barr's Little Rosey, for the American Broadcasting Company, which was cancelled in 1991, after its first season.

In Autumn 1993, Nelvana signed a multi-year project to co-produce five feature films for Paramount Pictures, with Kathleen Kennedy and Frank Marshall co-producing via The Kennedy/Marshall Company; the first two began co-production the following summer, at a cost of over US$20 million each. Three of the projects were based on books by E. B. White (The Trumpet of the Swan), Clive Barker (The Thief of Always) and Graeme Base (The Sign of the Seahorse); an original co-production called Mask Vision was also in the works.

However, none of those films ever made it past the finishing stage. During the 1990s, another set of features from Nelvana was distributed by various companies. 1997 saw the studio's retelling of Pippi Longstocking; and Babar: King of the Elephants was released in Canada by Alliance Atlantis in 1999.

In 1993, Nelvana along with Galaxy Films and De Souza Productions co-produced Cadillacs and Dinosaurs for the CBS network, based on the comic book of the same name (formally known as Xenozoic Tales) by Mark Schultz. It only lasted one season.

In September 1995, Nelvana co-produced Nancy Drew and The Hardy Boys based on the popular well-known book series. Tracy Ryan portrayed Nancy Drew while Colin Gray and Paul Popowich portrayed Frank and Joe Hardy, respectively. In addition, Jehene Erwin and Joy Tanner portrayed Bess Marvin and George Fayne, respectively, on Nancy Drew, while Fiona Highet played new character Kate Craigen. The series were based on The Nancy Drew Files and The Hardy Boys Casefiles. However, the series was not distributed well, mostly due to it being in first-run syndication, and both series were cancelled in December.

In September 1996, Golden Books Family Entertainment was in talks to acquire the company for US$102 million, just after having purchased the family video library of Broadway Video Entertainment, a subsidiary of Broadway Video. Many of the company's staff members, including Smith and Loubert, expressed interest in the proposition. But Hirsh went up against it, arguing with then COO Eleanor Olmsted about its possible effects on his institution. Two months later Golden Books withdrew from the deal stating that they would concentrate more on children's entertainment.

In November 1996, Virgin Interactive released Toonstruck, a PC-based adventure game featuring animation and artwork co-produced by Nelvana and Rainbow Animation. The game was set in an animated world using traditional 2D animation, but also featured the digitized likeness of actor Christopher Lloyd as a live-action character trapped in the animated world interacting with the cartoon characters around him. A sequel to the game was planned, but was cancelled due to poor sales.

In 1997, a small computer animation company called Windlight Studios was absorbed into Nelvana's assets. Its co-founder, Scott Dyer, became Nelvana's senior vice-president in charge of production in late 2001.

In late 1997, Nelvana and the United Kingdom's Channel 4 began work on Bob and Margaret, the company's first animated franchise for adults since Rock & Rule. It was based on the National Film Board of Canada's Bob's Birthday, an Academy Award winner for Best Short, which Channel 4 also co-produced.

In December 1997, Nelvana began distributing a syndicated programming block, the Nelvana Kidz Klub, through MediaVentures International, a Chicago-based distributor. The block was offered internationally on a barter program distribution model with one–two hours of daily sections or three–four hours of the weekend block.

In 1998, Nelvana entered into an agreement with U.S. network CBS to program a new Saturday morning animation block for the 1998–99 television season, which would be branded as the CBS Kidshow. The block would feature Franklin and the new series Anatole, Flying Rhino Junior High, Dumb Bunnies, Birdz, and Mythic Warriors; all six shows were billed as complying with the U.S. government's educational programming guidelines. In April 1998, Nelvana entered into an agreement with Scottish Television Enterprises to co-produce these new series, and hold distribution rights to them in the United Kingdom. In August 1998, Nelvana acquired Kids Can Press, publishers of the Franklin and Elliot Moose children's books upon which Franklin and Elliot Moose were based. This turned them into an "integrated company" in which Kids Can's subsequent publications would begin with Nelvana's franchising of those works.

The company's first two computer-animated shows, Donkey Kong Country (with Medialab) and Rolie Polie Olie (with Métal Hurlant Productions and Paris-based Sparx*), premiered on U.S. television in 1998.

In March 1999, Nelvana reported a 75% increase in earnings in 1998, credited to increased original production and sales of its library programming, the deal with CBS, and the addition of a publishing business with the acquisition of Kids Can Press. In August 1999, Nelvana announced a US$40 million deal to produce six new series based on popular children's books for a planned PBS block. The six series—Corduroy, Elliot Moose, Timothy Goes to School, Seven Little Monsters, George Shrinks, and Marvin the Tap-Dancing Horse—were launched the following September as part of the PBS Kids Bookworm Bunch line-up. That same month, it acquired the North American rights to its first anime property, Clamp's Cardcaptor Sakura (which was renamed Cardcaptors for its English dub).

=== 2000s ===
Logo without the mascot, used from September 7, 2004 to October 18, 2016.

In April 2000, Nelvana announced that it had filed for two category 2 television licences from the Canadian Radio-television and Telecommunications Commission to launch digital cable channels. The first, titled "The Nelvana Channel", would have presented the company's library of material alongside related information in a picture-in-picture format. The second, "Booknet", was to be focused on adaptations of adult and children's literature, and would have been a 60/40 joint venture between Corus Entertainment and Nelvana. The channels were approved that following November. Both licences expired as neither launched by the required date of November 24, 2004.

On April 14, 2000, Nelvana announced its purchase of the Palo Alto-based children's book publisher Klutz in a US$74 million deal—at that time, its largest buyout ever—and integrated it into its Branded Consumer Products division. The company, founded in 1977, was best known for its children's series, Books Plus. Nelvana's separate subsidiary, Kids Can, began taking advantage of the acquisition by making its output available through Klutz merchandise.

In September 2000, Corus bought Nelvana for $540 million. The company saw the purchase as being a complement to its children's television networks, including YTV and Treehouse. The acquisition was completed on November of that year.

A year after Corus' purchase, co-founders and co-CEOs Loubert and Smith left the studio. Loubert voluntarily left in November after Corus eliminated 50 positions from the staff, saying "The time has come that Corus will stop acquiring for a while and start operating. John Cassaday has made that clear, but this makes my job less rather than more".

In 2001, Nelvana acquired the rights to the English-language version of yet another anime series, Medabots. The following January, Beyblade (in association with Hasbro and Mitsubishi) became its third such property.

On November 5, 2001, Nelvana purchased all propetiary rights to Babar, excluding the franchise's publishing rights from the de Brunhoff family.

In October 2002, Corus announced Hirsh's resignation; the following month, Paul Robertson, former president of Corus Television and head of YTV, became leader of the studio's senior management. With Hirsh's departure, Corus announced a C$200 million writedown for the company; by next August, it planned to reduce the staff down to 200. Hirsh has also taken an advisory role in the studio.

The following September, Corus launched their home entertainment division. US-based FUNimation, along with British company Maverick, has distributed titles from the studio with this label, including Redwall, Pecola, Tales from the Cryptkeeper, Timothy Goes to School and the holiday special The Santa Claus Brothers. Nelvana's newer titles have been distributed by MGM, Lionsgate and ADV Films, which have no involvement with the label. In 2007, home video distribution rights for the company's catalogue were transferred to Shout! Factory in North America.

In 2004, the studio co-produced an animation anthology, which included 10 recurring shorts. Titled Funpak, it aired on YTV for 13 weeks starting in February 2005, with the winning short announced to be greenlit in May of that year. One of the shorts, Sidekick, was the one adapted into a successful cartoon series from 2010–2013.

In May 2006, NBC Universal announced a joint venture with Nelvana, Ion Media Networks, Scholastic, and Classic Media, known as Qubo, which aimed to operate a multi-platform children's educational television brand in the U.S. featuring programming from its partners.

In September 2006, a major split for Nelvana was announced: the company's studio operations (under the Nelvana Studio name) was integrated into Corus' children's television division, headed by executive vice-president and general manager Scott Dyer who, in addition to Nelvana, oversaw YTV, Treehouse and Discovery Kids Canada while Nelvana Enterprises, was created in the process, handling international distribution of the company's library as well as licensing for Nelvana's properties and Corus' properties outside of Canada. Doug Murphy became president of the new distribution and licensing unit.

In October 2006, Nelvana announced a co-production agreement with Canadian toy maker Spin Master and Japanese partners TMS Entertainment, Sega Toys and Japan Vistec to create the new anime property Bakugan Battle Brawlers. The series debuted in Canada on Teletoon the following summer and became a quick success. In 2008, merchandising rights were sold by Nelvana to Cartoon Network in the U.S., and the series began airing on the channel in February 2008. The initial incarnation of the franchise ran for four seasons, spanning 189 episodes and stimulated billions in merchandise sales.

=== 2010s ===
Following Bakugan, Nelvana entered into another anime co-production, this time reviving the Beyblade property with d-rights, Takara Tomy and Hasbro. Beyblade: Metal Fusion debuted globally in 2010, running for 167 episodes before inspiring a sub-franchise consisting of BeyWheelz, BeyWarriors: BeyRaiderz and BeyWarriors: Cyborg.

Their next program Mike the Knight debuted in 2011, a co-production between HIT Entertainment aired on Treehouse TV and CBeebies later in the year.

Detentionaire was produced between 2011 and 2015. Created for Teletoon, the show has also been aired internationally, including on ABC3, and has been released on a digital platform provided by Cartoon Network.

In 2012, Corus Entertainment acquired Canadian animation software developer Toon Boom. Nelvana had already used the company's software on projects like 6teen, Ruby Gloom as well as the aforementioned Detentionaire. Going forward, all of the studio's internally animated 2D productions would utilize their sister company's suite of products.

After Murphy had been appointed as CEO of Corus Entertainment, Scott Dyer was named president of Nelvana in 2015. The next year, Pam Westman became head of Nelvana.

On October 19, 2016, Nelvana redesigned their logo to mark the studio's 45th anniversary, as well as take part in Corus' brand refresh following latter's acquisition of Shaw Media. According to Dyer, this also symbolized a strategic shift from merchandise-based properties to more creator-driven projects, as well as a return to international co-productions. At that year's MIPCOM, the studio showcased new shows Esme & Roy (with Sesame Workshop), Hotel Transylvania: The Series and Mysticons. Nelvana also presented Bravest Warriors, a pre-existing series from Frederator Studios that they were now producing and Corn & Peg, a co-production with the US Nickelodeon.

The following October, Nelvana announced the launch of a new joint venture with Discovery Communications to create children's content for Canada, Latin America and the rest of the world. Later named "redknot", the division's first two projects include The Dog & Pony Show and Agent Binky: Pets of the Universe.

In 2018, Nelvana appointed Cinedigm as the company's new U.S. home video partner. In late 2018, the company relaunched Bakugan with Bakugan: Battle Planet, a co-production between Nelvana, Spin Master Entertainment, TMS Entertainment and Man of Action Studios.

The studio launched its first short film, The Most Magnificent Thing, in 2019 to showcase its technical abilities. Later that year, Dyer announced his retirement, with Westman named as his replacement.

=== 2020s ===
In October 2020, Nelvana agreed to co-produce Thomas & Friends: All Engines Go (with Mattel Television), a re-imagined revival of the original Thomas & Friends series, marking the franchise's first 2D-animated television series. That same month, the company entered an agreement with Duncan Studio to produce animated feature films. The first project announced from this collaboration was a feature film adaptation of the Ryan Andrews novel This Was Our Pact. Written by Will Collins and starring Peter Dinklage as "a mysterious and charismatic bear", the film will be co-produced by Dinklage through his production company, Estuary Films.

In July 2024, as a result of budget cuts and layoffs across Corus Entertainment, a number of positions at Nelvana were eliminated, including that of Vice President Athena Georgaklis, and all development of new projects was paused. Corus co-CEO John Gossling announced: "We're making tough decisions to shutter areas of the business we can no longer sustain and pause longer-term development activities while we implement efficiency initiatives". The year prior, Corus sold its software subsidiary Toon Boom Animation to Integrated Media Company, a portfolio company of TPG Inc. for $111 million to help the company pay down its debt.

A year later, on September 2, 2025, Corus announced that future production at Nelvana would be temporarily paused, and any current projects would also be paused until further notice, instead of being shut down, as this came after they announced plans to focus on maintaining better-performing properties. However, Corus would continue to operate the licensing, distribution, and library unit.

== Franchises ==
Many of Nelvana's TV shows are based on properties from other companies, most of which started in other forms of media (excluding its namesake superhero, which never received an adaptation of any kind). A great deal of them are based on children's literature and comic books; examples include Blazing Dragons, Stickin' Around, Wayside, Cadillacs and Dinosaurs, The Adventures of Tintin, Anatole, Babar, The Berenstain Bears, Franklin, Jane and the Dragon, Little Bear, The Magic School Bus, Pippi Longstocking, Redwall, Rupert, My Dad the Rock Star, and Max & Ruby, as well as Tales from the Cryptkeeper, Beetlejuice, Jacob Two-Two, Sidekick and Teletoon/Nick Jr.'s Miss Spider's Sunny Patch Friends.

Nelvana has also had considerable success with animated fare based on toys; American Greetings' Care Bears has been the most familiar example of this. Also, there have been series and specials based on Strawberry Shortcake (also from American Greetings), Madballs and My Pet Monster (from AmToy) and Rescue Heroes (from Fisher-Price). Nelvana also produced Fresh Beat Band of Spies, an animated revival of The Fresh Beat Band that is produced by 6 Point Harness for Nickelodeon.

It has also adapted big-screen franchises to televised properties, such as Star Wars (Droids and Ewoks), Beetlejuice, An American Tail (Fievel's American Tails), Free Willy and The Neverending Story. It has even ventured into the video game world with a show based on Nintendo's Donkey Kong: Donkey Kong Country.

In the field of anime, the company holds the North American rights to Clamp/Kodansha's Cardcaptor Sakura series. Also, it holds international licensing rights to Beyblade and Medabots and the Bakugan franchise.

As with many other animation studios, Nelvana has a wide range of established original series and characters within its roster; 6teen, Fun Street, Clone High, Birdz, Corn & Peg, and Eek! The Cat are some of Nelvana's more notable animated series not adapted from older works.

As of 2008, the studio has made close to 25 feature films for theatre, home entertainment, and television distribution. Well-known releases include Rock & Rule, the first five Care Bears films, two Babar films, and the 1997 Pippi Longstocking.

Live-action has been a part of its mainstay from its early years. The company has had Burglar and Malice as its own feature projects in that area, and has contributed as such to Star Wars Holiday Special and Three Amigos. On television, Nelvana has made live-action shows such as The Edison Twins, Nancy Drew, The Hardy Boys, and Life with Boys.

On February 5, 2013, Nelvana launched the Treehouse Direct channel on YouTube.

On April 29, 2015, they launched a YouTube channel promoted by YTV as Nelvana Retro, which was renamed "YTV Direct" in 2016 after also deciding to incorporate non-Nelvana content such as Nickelodeon shows. It was later renamed Keep it Weird to incorporate more content from the company.

On September 14, 2015, Nelvana launched a YouTube channel called Kindlight Lane.

== Around the world ==
The Fairly OddParents, created by animator Butch Hartman, was distributed by Nelvana outside the U.S. from 2001 to 2005. This show has been in the top of the ratings for Nickelodeon, YTV and the BBC, and has also been successful among viewers in all European markets, Latin America, Australia, and Canada. Nickelodeon's Taina was also distributed by Nelvana in 2001 and 2002. The series was cancelled in 2002, but had mixed to positive reviews and ratings in late 2001. Nick Jr.'s The Backyardigans, in addition to being distributed by Nelvana outside the U.S., was also co-produced by Nelvana. Disney XD's Mr. Young, in addition to being distributed by Nelvana around the U.S., was produced by Thunderbird Films. On February 22, 2007, it was announced that Nelvana signed a deal to internationally distribute the first season of Horrid Henry outside of the United Kingdom and German-speaking territories. By February 2008, its international distribution deal was replaced by Little Bird Rights.

In the United States, Nelvana's series have been broadcast on terrestrial, cable and streaming networks, and internationally on over 360 television stations in more 180 countries, in approximately 50 languages.

== Notable personnel ==
Apart from its three founders, there have been several key personnel from Nelvana's past and present, a great deal of whom have left the company. Some of the better-known people who have worked for the studio at one point or another include animators Wayne Gilbert, Peter Hudecki, Tom McGillis, Jennifer Pertsch, Vincenzo Natali, Arna Selznick, Natalie Turner, and John van Bruggen, and voice actors Tara Strong, Cree Summer, Maurice LaMarche, and Michael Cera. The British and Canadian duo of Alison Snowden and David Fine won an Academy Award for animation before starting to work for Nelvana.

Former Nelvana employees Roger Allers, Charles Bonifacio, Ralph Palmer, Kori Rae, Joe Ranft, David Soren, and Ralph Zondag went on to become staff members at Walt Disney Feature Animation and DreamWorks Animation starting in the 1980s. Allers went on to direct The Lion King and Open Season. Lenora Hume, from the company's early years, was the senior vice-president of DisneyToon Studios and Pixar.

== Influence in popular culture ==
The "Nelvana Independent Short Film Grand Prize", given out at the Ottawa International Animation Festival from 2004 to 2006, was sponsored by the company. The recipients of this prize were 2004's Ryan, the Chris Landreth biography about Canadian animator Ryan Larkin; 2005's Milch, from director Igor Kovalyov; and, in 2006, Joanna Quinn's Dreams and Desires: Family Ties.

== See also ==
- Cinema of Canada
- History of Canadian film
- History of Canadian animation
- List of Nelvana programs

=== Related Canadian companies ===
- National Film Board of Canada
- Cookie Jar Group (formerly Cinar, bought and folded into DHX Media, now WildBrain, in 2012)
- CinéGroupe
- Atkinson Film-Arts (defunct since 1989)
- WildBrain
- C.O.R.E. (defunct since 2010)
- Studio B Productions (merged with Nerd Corps Entertainment to form DHX Studios, now WildBrain Studios, in 2011)

=== Related International companies ===
- DIC Entertainment (bought and folded into Cookie Jar Group in 2008)

== Bibliography ==
- Stoffman, Daniel (2001). The Nelvana Story: Thirty Animated Years. Toronto, Ontario: Nelvana Publishing Company (ISBN 1-894786-00-9).
