= Romie-0 and Julie-8 =

1979 animated TV special

- Written by: William Shakespeare (play)
- Screenplay by: Ken Sobol; Elaine Pope; (animation)
- Story by: Michael Hirsh; Clive A. Smith
- Directed by: Clive A. Smith
- Starring: Max Ferguson; Nick Nichols; Donann Cavin; Bill Osler; Marie Aloma; Greg Swanson
- Music by: John Sebastian; Patricia Cullen; Rory Block; Reggie Knighton; John Hall; Richard Manuel; Curtis Teel; Eric Parker; Michael Manieri
- Country of origin: Canada
- Original language: English

Production
- Producers: Michael Hirsh; Patrick Loubert
- Production company: Nelvana Limited

Original release
- Release: April 14, 1979

Romie-0 and Julie-8 is a 1979 Canadian animated television special, inspired by William Shakespeare's Romeo and Juliet. Set in the future, the two romantic leads in this version are androids who fall in love despite a taboo against their kind having such relationships. The special premiered in Canada on CBC and in the USA in syndication on April 14, 1979. The special is the third television special in the 1977 to 1980 series of specials produced by the Canadian animation studio Nelvana Limited. The special is also known as Runaway Robots!.

== Plot ==
In the future, two rival robotics firms are hard at work trying to create the next major leap in robotics. Both tout their wares at the latest robotics convention. The Mega Stellar Company has released their Romie-0 model of robot, while Super Solar Cybernetics has released Julie-8. However, unforeseen by their creators, Romie-0 and Julie-8 begin to fall in love, harbouring feelings for the other.

After the convention, Romie-0 comes to Julie-8, and admits that due to their company's rivalry, they most likely cannot be together. The two decide to run away in order to keep from being broken up. Unsure where to go, they come across a rather shifty individual named Gizmo, who agrees to help them find a safe haven.

Meanwhile, both of the two robots' creators (Mr. Thunderbottom and Ms. Passbinder) find that their creations are gone. At first they blame the other for stealing their creation, but then agree to work in tandem to find their robots when it turns out that neither one knows what has become of them.

Unknown to the two creators, Gizmo has transported Romie-0 and Julie-8 to a planet of junk named Trash-0-Lot, where the two come face-to-face with an enormous Junk Monster named Sparepartski. The monster has Romie-0 transported to the other side of the planet, but imprisons Julie-8 for his own purposes. Gizmo appears to her shortly afterward, and suggests that she offer to marry the Junk Monster in exchange for Romie-0's freedom off the planet. Julie-8 decides to try this offer, and Sparepartski accepts, much to the girl's displeasure. While happy for Romie-0's release, Julie-8 is saddened over her fate, and removes a necessary circuit, causing her to "die". In the meantime Sparepartski has found Thunderbottom and Passbinder's ship nearby, and taken them prisoner as well.

Unknown to Julie-8, Romie-0 has managed to escape from the other side of the planet, and has made his way to her chambers. Upon finding her with her circuit removed, Romie-0 reinstalls it, and the two attempt to escape. Along their way out, they encounter their creators trussed up, and set about freeing them.

However, their escape does not go unnoticed, and Sparepartski soon starts to chase them across the junkscape. The two robot lovers carry their creators in hopes to get them to safety, but end up locking up when they run into a "rust storm". The immobilization of the two robots causes their creators to carry them out of harm's way.

The rust storm also claims Sparepartski, who it is then revealed was a giant scrap concoction created and operated by Gizmo. Gizmo reveals his love for machines, and after seeing Julie-8 at the robotics convention, wanted to make her his bride. Romie-0 and Julie-8 then convince Gizmo that with the amount of trash on the planet, he could very well fashion his own sweetheart. Meanwhile, Mr. Thunderbottom and Ms. Passbinder (who have fallen in love with each other) have reconciled their differences, deciding to unite their robotics houses in a merger, much to the delight of Romie-0 and Julie-8.

== Voice cast ==
- Greg Swanson as Romie-0
- Donann Cavin as Julie-8
- Max Ferguson as Mr. Thunderbottom
- Marie Aloma as Ms. Passbinder
- Bill Osler as Junk Monster
- Nick Nichols as Gizmo

== Music ==
Songs for Romie-0 and Julie-8 were composed by John Sebastian, with musical score by Patricia Cullen, both of whom had also worked on the preceding Nelvana cartoon The Devil and Daniel Mouse. Richard Manuel of The Band is also credited.
