= 1960 in Canadian television =

The following is a list of events affecting Canadian television in 1960. Events listed include television show debuts, finales, cancellations, and channel launches.

== Notable events ==
- April 24-CBC opened French-language station CBWFT in Winnipeg
- September 9-CFCN-TV was inaugurated in Calgary
- September 23-CHSA-TV was inaugurated in Lloydminster, Alberta, and later became CKSA-TV
- October 31-CHAN-TV opened in Vancouver
- November 7-Bobinette makes her first appearance in that day’s episode of Bobino, which was the first episode of its fourth season.
- November 12-CJAY-TV opened in Winnipeg. It later became CKY-TV

== Births ==
- May 29 – Neil Crone, Canadian actor, voice actor, comedian and motivational speaker
- June 22 – Catherine Disher, British born Canadian actress and voice actress

== Television shows ==
=== Debuts ===
==== Canadian Broadcasting Corporation ====
- April 2-Reflections (1960–62)
- June 8-First Person (1960-1961)
- July 8-Red River Jamboree (1960-1965)
- September 21-The Nation's Business (1960-)
- September 26-The Jack Kane Show (1960-1961)
- October 2-The World of Music (1960-1961)
- October 6
  - Klondike (1960-1961)
  - Midnight Zone (1960-1962)
- October 10-Festival (1960-1969)
- October 17
  - Junior Roundup (1960-1961)
  - The Verdict is Yours (1960-1961)

October 18

  - Club 6 (1960-1962)
  - Music Break (1960-1962)
- October 20-Music in Miniature (1960-1968)
- November 6-The Nature of Things (1960-1983)
- December 26-Inquiry (1960-1964)

=== Television shows on air ===
==== CBC ====
- Country Canada (1954-2007)
- CBC News Magazine (1952-1981)
- The National (1954–present)
- The C.G.E. Show (1952-1959)
- Circle 8 Ranch (1955-1978)
- Front Page Challenge (1957-1995)
- Hockey Night in Canada (1952–present)
- Maggie Muggins (1955–1962)
- Open House (1952-1962)
- Wayne and Shuster Show (1958-1989)

==== SRC ====
- Chez Hélène (1959-1973)

== Television stations ==
=== Debuts ===
Date	Market	Station	Channel	Affiliation	Notes/references
April 24	Winnipeg, Manitoba	CBWFT	6	Radio-Canada	
September 9	Calgary, Alberta	CFCN-TV	4	Independent	
September 23	Lloydminster, Alberta-Saskatchewan	CHSA-TV	2	CBC Television	
October 31	Vancouver, British Columbia	CHAN	8	Independent	
November 7	Winnipeg, Manitoba	KCND-TV	12	Independent (primary); NBC and ABC (secondary)	Licensed to Pembina, North Dakota, United States near the Canada–United States border, serving Winnipeg and southern Manitoba, northeast North Dakota and northwest Minnesota.
November 12	Winnipeg, Manitoba	CJAY-TV	7	Independent	
December 31	Toronto, Ontario	CFTO-TV	9	Independent	

== Births ==
Date	Name	Notability
January 17	Tracey Moore	Actress (Sailor Moon)
August 10	Steven Ogg	Actor

== See also ==
- 1960 in Canada
- List of Canadian films
