= 1987–88 United States network television schedule (daytime) =

The following is the 1987–88 daytime network television schedule for the three major English-language commercial broadcast networks in the United States. It covers the weekday and weekend daytime hours from September 1987 to August 1988.

== Legend ==
- Light yellow indicates talk shows.
- Green indicates soap operas.
- Pink indicates game shows.
- Gold indicates news and public affairs programming.
- Light teal indicates sporting events.
- White indicates local programming.
- Light purple indicates children's programming.
- Gray indicates encore programming (e.g., reruns of prime-time programming).
- New series are highlighted in **bold**.

== Schedule ==
- All times correspond to U.S. Eastern and Pacific Time scheduling (except for some live sports or events). Except where affiliates slot certain programs outside their network-dictated timeslots, subtract one hour for Central, Mountain, Alaska, and Hawaii-Aleutian times.
- Local schedules may differ, as affiliates have the option to pre-empt or delay network programs. Such scheduling may be limited to preemptions caused by local or national breaking news or weather coverage (which may force stations to tape delay certain programs to later timeslots) and any major sports events scheduled to air in a weekday timeslot (mainly during major holidays). Stations may air shows at other times at their preference.

=== Monday–Friday ===
Network		6:00 am	6:30 am	7:00 am	7:30 am	8:00 am	8:30 am	9:00 am	9:30 am	10:00 am	10:30 am	11:00 am	11:30 am	noon	12:30 pm	1:00 pm	1:30 pm	2:00 pm	2:30 pm	3:00 pm	3:30 pm	4:00 pm	4:30 pm	5:00 pm	5:30 pm	6:00 pm	6:30 pm
ABC	Fall	ABC World News This Morning		Good Morning America				Local/syndicated programming				Who's the Boss?	**Mr. Belvedere**	Ryan's Hope	Loving	All My Children		One Life to Live		General Hospital		Local/syndicated programming					ABC World News Tonight with Peter Jennings
ABC	Winter	ABC World News This Morning		Good Morning America				Local/syndicated programming				Who's the Boss?	**The Home Show**	Ryan's Hope	Loving	All My Children		One Life to Live		General Hospital		Local/syndicated programming					ABC World News Tonight with Peter Jennings
ABC	Summer	ABC World News This Morning		Good Morning America				Local/syndicated programming				**Growing Pains**	**The Home Show**	Ryan's Hope	Loving	All My Children		One Life to Live		General Hospital		Local/syndicated programming					ABC World News Tonight with Peter Jennings
CBS	Fall	CBS Morning News			The Morning Program			Local/syndicated programming		The $25,000 Pyramid	Card Sharks	The Price Is Right		Local/syndicated programming	The Young and the Restless		The Bold and the Beautiful	As the World Turns		Guiding Light		Local/syndicated programming					CBS Evening News with Dan Rather
CBS	Winter	CBS Morning News		**CBS This Morning**				Local/syndicated programming		**Blackout**	Card Sharks	The Price Is Right		Local/syndicated programming	The Young and the Restless		The Bold and the Beautiful	As the World Turns		Guiding Light		Local/syndicated programming					CBS Evening News with Dan Rather
CBS	Spring	CBS Morning News		**CBS This Morning**				Local/syndicated programming		The $25,000 Pyramid	Card Sharks	The Price Is Right		Local/syndicated programming	The Young and the Restless		The Bold and the Beautiful	As the World Turns		Guiding Light		Local/syndicated programming					CBS Evening News with Dan Rather
CBS	Summer	CBS Morning News		**CBS This Morning**				Local/syndicated programming		**Family Feud**	Card Sharks	The Price Is Right		Local/syndicated programming	The Young and the Restless		The Bold and the Beautiful	As the World Turns		Guiding Light		Local/syndicated programming					CBS Evening News with Dan Rather
NBC		Before Hours	NBC News at Sunrise	Today				Local/syndicated programming		Sale of the Century	Classic Concentration	Wheel of Fortune	**Win, Lose or Draw**	Super Password	Scrabble	Days of Our Lives		Another World		Santa Barbara		Local/syndicated programming					NBC Nightly News with Tom Brokaw

=== Saturday ===
Network		7:00 am	7:30 am	8:00 am	8:30 am	9:00 am	9:30 am	10:00 am	10:30 am	11:00 am	11:30 am	noon	12:30 pm	1:00 pm	1:30 pm	2:00 pm	2:30 pm	3:00 pm	3:30 pm	4:00 pm	4:30 pm	5:00 pm	5:30 pm	6:00 pm	6:30 pm
ABC	Fall	Local and/or syndicated programming		The Care Bears Family	**Little Clowns of Happytown**	**My Pet Monster**	All New Pound Puppies	**Little Wizards**	The Real Ghostbusters	The Flintstone Kids	The Bugs Bunny and Tweety Show	**Animal Crack-Ups**	ABC Weekend Special	College Football on ABC											
ABC	Winter	Local and/or syndicated programming		Little Clowns of Happytown	All New Pound Puppies	**My Pet Monster**	Little Wizards	The Real Ghostbusters		The Bugs Bunny and Tweety Show	The Flintstone Kids	**Animal Crack-Ups**	ABC Weekend Special	ABC Sports and/or local programming										Local news	ABC World News Saturday
ABC	Summer	Local and/or syndicated programming		Little Wizards	All New Pound Puppies	**My Pet Monster**	The Flintstone Kids	The Real Ghostbusters		The Bugs Bunny and Tweety Show		**Animal Crack-Ups**	ABC Weekend Special	ABC Sports and/or local programming										Local news	ABC World News Saturday
CBS	Fall	Local and/or syndicated programming		**Hello Kitty's Furry Tale Theater**	Jim Henson's Muppet Babies			Pee-wee's Playhouse	**Mighty Mouse: The New Adventures**	**Popeye and Son**	Teen Wolf	CBS Storybreak	Kidd Video (R)	CBS Sports and/or local programming										Local news	CBS Evening News
CBS	Winter	Local and/or syndicated programming		**Hello Kitty's Furry Tale Theater**	Jim Henson's Muppet Babies			Pee-wee's Playhouse	**Mighty Mouse: The New Adventures**	**Popeye and Son**	**Dennis the Menace**	Teen Wolf	Galaxy High (R)	CBS Sports and/or local programming										Local news	CBS Evening News
NBC	Fall	Local and/or syndicated programming		Adventures of the Gummi Bears	The Smurfs			**Jim Henson's Fraggle Rock**	Alvin and the Chipmunks	**ALF**	**The New Archies**	Foofur	**I'm Telling!**	NBC Sports and/or local programming										Local news	NBC Nightly News
NBC	November	Local and/or syndicated programming		Adventures of the Gummi Bears	The Smurfs			ALF	Alvin and the Chipmunks	Jim Henson's Fraggle Rock	**The New Archies**	Foofur	**I'm Telling!**	NBC Sports and/or local programming										Local news	NBC Nightly News

CBS note: Muppet Babies expanded to 90 minutes for this season to take the spot that would have been filled by Garbage Pail Kids; which had been pulled shortly before the season began due to criticisms from groups such as Action for Children's Television and American Family Association.

=== Sunday ===
Network		7:00 am	7:30 am	8:00 am	8:30 am	9:00 am	9:30 am	10:00 am	10:30 am	11:00 am	11:30 am	noon	12:30 pm	1:00 pm	1:30 pm	2:00 pm	2:30 pm	3:00 pm	3:30 pm	4:00 pm	4:30 pm	5:00 pm	5:30 pm	6:00 pm	6:30 pm
ABC		Local and/or syndicated programming							This Week with David Brinkley		ABC Sports and/or local programming													Local news	ABC World News Sunday
CBS	Fall	Local and/or syndicated programming				CBS News Sunday Morning			Face the Nation	Local and/or syndicated programming		The NFL Today	NFL on CBS and/or local programming												
CBS	Mid-winter	Local and/or syndicated programming				CBS News Sunday Morning			Face the Nation	Local and/or syndicated programming		CBS Sports and/or local programming												Local news	CBS Evening News
NBC	Fall	Local and/or syndicated programming		**Sunday Today**			Meet the Press	Local and/or syndicated programming				**NFL Live!**	NFL on NBC												
NBC	Mid-winter	Local and/or syndicated programming		**Sunday Today**			Meet the Press	Local and/or syndicated programming				NBC Sports and/or local programming												Local news	NBC Nightly News

== By network ==
=== ABC ===
**Returning series**

- ABC Weekend Special
- ABC World News This Morning
- ABC World News Tonight with Peter Jennings
- All My Children
- The Bugs Bunny and Tweety Show
- The Care Bears Family
- The Flintstone Kids
- General Hospital
- Good Morning America
- Loving
- One Life to Live
- All New Pound Puppies
- The Real Ghostbusters
- Ryan's Hope
- This Week with David Brinkley
- Who's the Boss? (reruns)

**New series**

- **Animal Crack-Ups** (moving from primetime)
- **Growing Pains** (reruns)
- **The Home Show**
- **Little Clowns of Happytown**
- **Little Wizards**
- **Mr. Belvedere** (reruns)
- **My Pet Monster**

**Not returning from 1986–87**

- American Bandstand (continued in syndication)
- Bargain Hunters
- Double Talk
- Ewoks
- Fame, Fortune and Romance
- Webster (reruns)
- The Wuzzles (reruns)

=== CBS ===
**Returning series**

- The $25,000 Pyramid
- As the World Turns
- The Bold and the Beautiful
- Card Sharks
- CBS Evening News
- CBS Morning News
- CBS News Sunday Morning
- CBS Storybreak
- Dennis the Menace
- Face the Nation
- Family Feud
- Galaxy High (reruns)
- Guiding Light
- Jim Henson's Muppet Babies
- Kidd Video (reruns) (moved from NBC)
- The Morning Program
- Pee-wee's Playhouse
- The Price Is Right
- Teen Wolf
- The Young and the Restless

**New series**

- **Blackout**
- **CBS This Morning**
- **Hello Kitty's Furry Tale Theater**
- **Mighty Mouse: The New Adventures**
- **Popeye and Son**

**Not returning from 1986–87**

- The Berenstain Bears
- Capitol
- Dungeons & Dragons (reruns)
- Hulk Hogan's Rock 'n' Wrestling
- Land of the Lost (reruns)
- The Puppy's Further Adventures (reruns)
- Richie Rich (reruns)
- Wildfire

=== NBC ===
**Returning series**

- Disney's Adventures of the Gummi Bears
- Alvin and the Chipmunks
- Another World
- Classic Concentration (reruns)
- Days of Our Lives
- Foofur
- Kissyfur
- Meet the Press
- NBC News at Sunrise
- NBC Nightly News
- It's Punky Brewster (reruns)
- Sale of the Century
- Santa Barbara
- Scrabble
- The Smurfs
- Super Password
- Today
- Wheel of Fortune

**New series**

- **ALF**
- **Jim Henson's Fraggle Rock**
- **I'm Telling!**
- **The New Archies**
- **Sunday Today**
- **Win, Lose or Draw**

**Not returning from 1986–87**

- Blockbusters
- Family Ties (reruns)
- It's Punky Brewster
- Kidd Video (reruns) (moved to CBS)
- Lazer Tag Academy
- Main Street
- Search for Tomorrow
- Wordplay

== See also ==
- 1987-88 United States network television schedule (prime-time)
- 1987-88 United States network television schedule (late night)

== Sources ==
- https://web.archive.org/web/20071015122215/http://curtalliaume.com/abc_day.html
- https://web.archive.org/web/20071015122235/http://curtalliaume.com/cbs_day.html
- https://web.archive.org/web/20071012211242/http://curtalliaume.com/nbc_day.html
