= The Care Bears Family =

Children's animated television series

- Genre: Slapstick; Fantasy
- Created by: Linda Denham; Elena Kucharik
- Based on: Care Bears franchise by American Greetings
- Written by: John de Klein
- Directed by: David Marshall; Jim Craig; Joseph Sherman; Lawrence Z. Jacobs; Laura Shepherd
- Starring: Jim Henshaw; Chris Wiggins; John Stocker; Terri Hawkes; Sunny Besen Thrasher; Noam Zylberman; Tracey Moore
- Theme music composer: John Sebastian
- Opening theme: "Care Bears Countdown" performed by John Sebastian
- Ending theme: "Care Bears Countdown" (instrumental)
- Composer: Patricia Cullen
- Countries of origin: Canada; United States
- Original language: English
- No. of seasons: 3
- No. of episodes: 49 (78 segments + 1 three-part special) (list of episodes)

Production
- Executive producer: Lenora Hume
- Producers: Michael Hirsh; Patrick Loubert; Clive A. Smith
- Running time: 25 minutes
- Production companies: Nelvana (Note: Animation outsourced to Wang Film Productions.); C.B.I.S. Productions

Original release
- Network: ABC (United States, season 1-2); Syndication (United States, season 3); Global Television Network (Canada)
- Release: September 13, 1986 – November 25, 1988

Related
- Care Bears; Care Bears: Adventures in Care-a-lot

The Care Bears Family is a Canadian children's animated television series produced by Nelvana and C.B.I.S. Productions based on the American franchise of the same name, and is the successor series to the American animated series produced by DIC Entertainment. It was originally broadcast from September 13, 1986 to November 25, 1988. 49 episodes were produced.

The first two seasons originally aired on ABC. However, ABC decided not to air the third season; network officials said they "got killed" in the second season since the people meter was too difficult for preschoolers to operate. ABC ran a number of preschool-oriented cartoons that season, all of which suffered in the ratings. Season 3 instead aired in syndication in the U.S. In Canada, it aired on the Global Television Network.

== Synopsis ==
The Care Bears live in a faraway place up in the clouds called Care-a-Lot, which constitutes a part of the Kingdom of Caring. With the help of the Cousins and their Buddies, they go all around the world on Missions in Caring thwarting the evil plans of Lord No Heart.

== Episodes ==
Season	Episodes	Originally released		
Season	Episodes	First released	Last released	Network
Specials	2	April 22, 1983	April 6, 1984	N/A
DIC series	11	September 14, 1985	November 23, 1985	Syndication
1	13	September 13, 1986	December 6, 1986	ABC (U.S.)
2	6	September 26, 1987	October 31, 1987	ABC (U.S.)
3	30	September 12, 1988	November 25, 1988	Syndication (U.S.); Global (Canada)

== Voice cast ==
Season 1

- Jim Henshaw – Tenderheart Bear
- Bob Dermer – Grumpy Bear
- Dan Hennessey – Brave Heart Lion
- Chris Wiggins – No Heart
- John Stocker – Beastly
- Eva Almos – Friend Bear
- Patrice Black – Share Bear
- Melleny Brown – Cheer Bear, Baby Tugs Bear
- Jayne Eastwood – Birthday Bear
- Anni Evans – Champ Bear
- Paulina Gillis – Swift Heart Rabbit
- Luba Goy – Gentle Heart Lamb, Lotsa Heart Elephant
- Janet Laine-Green – Wish Bear
- Nonnie Griffin – Funshine Bear
- Terri Hawkes – Baby Hugs Bear
- Ellen-Ray Hennessy – Proud Heart Cat, Bedtime Bear
- Marla Lukofsky – Good Luck Bear, Playful Heart Monkey
- Eric Peterson – Noble Heart Horse
- Pauline Rennie – Cozy Heart Penguin, Grams Bear
- Billie Mae Richards – Bright Heart Raccoon
- Carolyn Scott – True Heart Bear

Additional voices

- Laurie Waller Benson – Polite Panda
- Alyson Court – Amber
- Victor Erdos
- Michael Fantini – Adam
- Don Francks – Dr. Fright
- Ray Jafelice
- Keram Malicki-Sanchez
- Don McManus – Sour Sam
- Barbara Redpath
- Eric Richards
- Cree Summer Francks – Gay
- Greg Swanson – Perfect Panda
- Tina Teggart
- Sunny Besen Thrasher – Dale
- Lee-Max Walton
- Jason Whitebread
- Noam Zylberman – Charles

Season 2

- Dan Hennessey – Brave Heart Lion
- John Stocker – Beastly
- Eva Almos – Champ Bear
- Billie Mae Richards – Bright Heart Raccoon
- Luba Goy – Treat Heart Pig
- Tracey Moore – Cheer Bear
- Bob Dermer – Grumpy Bear
- Pauline Rennie – Grams Bear
- Chris Wiggins – No Heart
- Terri Hawkes – Baby Hugs Bear, Shreeky
- Melleny Brown – Baby Tugs Bear

=== Additional voices ===
- Tara Charendoff – Carol
- Keith Hampshire
- Lisa Jakub – Anne

Season 3

- Melleny Brown – Cheer Bear, Baby Tugs Bear
- Bob Dermer – Grumpy Bear
- Luba Goy – Lotsa Heart Elephant, Treat Heart Pig
- Dan Hennessey – Brave Heart Lion, Announcer, Additional Voices
- Jim Henshaw – Tenderheart Bear
- Tracey Moore – Baby Hugs Bear, Shreeky
- Pauline Rennie – Grams Bear
- Billie Mae Richards – Bright Heart Raccoon, Tenderheart Bear
- Susan Roman – Champ Bear
- John Stocker – Beastly
- Chris Wiggins – No Heart

=== Additional voices ===
- Eva Almos
- Michael Beattie
- Mairon Bennett
- Tara Charendoff – Rebecca, Claire
- Jayne Eastwood – Bedtime Bear
- Don Francks
- Paulina Gillis – Swift Heart Rabbit
- Abby Hagyard
- Keith Hampshire – Songfellow Strum
- Terri Hawkes
- Keith Knight
- Adam Simpson
- Sunny Besen Thrasher

== Home media ==
Select episodes of the Nelvana series were released on VHS in the late 1980s by Kideo Video (distributed by Lorimar Home Video) and Fries Home Video in the United States.

In 2002, the Care Bears toy line was reintroduced by Play Along Toys and featured plush toys that came with a VHS featuring either one or two episodes from the series.

In Region 1, Lionsgate Home Entertainment has released many episodes on DVD in various single-disc collections from 2004 to 2008. In total, 12 collections have been released, each featuring random episodes from the series.

On October 9, 2012, Lionsgate released Care Bears: The Original Series Collection on DVD in Region 1 for the very first time. The 6-disc set features the majority of episodes from the series (from the previously released discs excluding King of the Moon and Give Thanks) as well as the bonus feature Care Bears Nutcracker Suite.

In Region 4, Magna Entertainment released all 52 episodes (in chronological order) on DVD in Australia in 2004 in 12 separate volumes.
