= Pauline Rennie =

Canadian voice actress

- Born: Merna Pauline Reinke; December 14, 1911; Hamilton, Ontario, Canada
- Died: January 7, 1998 (aged 86); Port Perry, Ontario, Canada
- Occupation: Voice actor

Merna Pauline Lesauvage (née Reinke; December 14, 1911 – January 7, 1998), known professionally as Pauline Rennie, was a Canadian voice actress whose career included voice roles on several 1980s cartoons, including Star Wars: Ewoks, Care Bears, Popples and The Raccoons. Rennie, who hailed from Toronto, provided the voice of Fizgerald Fieldmouse on Maggie Muggins, as well as voices on Mary Grannan's follow-up 1960 series for the Canadian Broadcasting Corporation, Just Mary.

== Filmography ==
- Maggie Muggins (1955) – Fizgerald Fieldmouse
- Just Mary (1960)
- The Care Bears Movie (1985) – Grams Bear, Cozy Heart Penguin
- Care Bears (1985) – Cozy Heart Penguin, Treat Heart Pig
- Star Wars: Ewoks (1985–1986)
- The Care Bears Family (1986–1988) – Grams Bear, Cozy Heart Penguin, Treat Heart Pig
- Popples (1986) – Pancake
- The Raccoons (1987) – Aunt Gertie
