= Port Watch =

Canadian television documentary miniseries

- Genre: Documentary
- Presented by: Thomas Gilchrist
- Country of origin: Canada
- Original language: English
- No. of seasons: 1
- No. of episodes: 3

Production
- Production location: Vancouver

Original release
- Network: CBC Television
- Release: 18 July – 1 August 1955

Port Watch is a Canadian television documentary miniseries about the marine industry that aired on CBC Television in 1955.

== Premise ==
This series was produced in Vancouver with host Thomas Gilchrist, a sea captain who wrote for various CBC productions including Tidewater Tramp.

== Scheduling ==
- 18 July 1955 - This episode featured George Unwin who supervised salvage activities on the MV Gulf Stream, a passenger vessel which capsized in British Columbia waters.
- 25 July 1955 - Marine firefighting procedures were described, including scenes of a fireboat in Vancouver.
- 1 August 1955 - This episode explored the challenges of loading and unloading freighters and highlighted how longshoremen were hired.
