= Care Bears (TV series) =

American animated television series

- Original title card for the series
- Created by: Linda Denham; Elena Kucharik
- Developed by: Sandy Fries; Jack Olesker
- Written by: Eleanor Burian-Mohr; Randal Case; Howard R. Cohen; Matt Geller; Jack Hanrahan; Don Hart; Shelly Karol; Francis Moss; Jack Olesker; Bruce Reisman
- Directed by: James A. Simon
- Voices of: Billie Mae Richards; Jayne Eastwood; Janet Laine-Green; Luba Goy; Eva Almos; Melleny Brown; Dan Hennessey; Pauline Rennie; Patrice Black; Laurie Waller Benson; Bob Dermer; Marla Lukofsky
- Opening theme: "I Wanna Be A Care Bear"
- Country of origin: United States
- Original language: English
- No. of seasons: 1
- No. of episodes: 11 (22 segments) (list of episodes)

Production
- Executive producers: Andy Heyward; Tetsuo Katayama
- Producer: Jean Chalopin
- Running time: 30 minutes
- Production companies: DIC Enterprises; Those Characters From Cleveland; LBS Communications

Original release
- Network: Syndication
- Release: September 14 – November 23, 1985

Care Bears is an American children's animated fantasy adventure television series based on the franchise of the same name. After two specials in 1983, the main series began in 1985. The series was produced by DIC Audiovisuel's American branch DIC Enterprises and aired on syndication a while after the theatrical release of the first movie in the series.

In 1986, The Care Bears Family, a successor series by the Canadian studio Nelvana that had produced the movies, aired on ABC in the United States and in 1988 on Global Television Network in Canada.

In 2007, Sabella Dern Entertainment produced a revival, Care Bears: Adventures in Care-a-lot.

== Synopsis ==
The Care Bears live in a faraway place up in the clouds called Care-a-lot, which constitutes a part of the Kingdom of Caring. With the help of the Cousins and their Buddies, they go all around the world on Missions in Caring whilst they try to thwart the plans of the evil Professor Coldheart.

== Episodes ==
Season	Episodes	Originally released		
Season	Episodes	First released	Last released	Network
Specials	2	April 22, 1983	April 6, 1984	N/A
DIC series	11	September 14, 1985	November 23, 1985	Syndication
1	13	September 13, 1986	December 6, 1986	ABC (U.S.)
2	6	September 26, 1987	October 31, 1987	ABC (U.S.)
3	30	September 12, 1988	November 25, 1988	Syndication (U.S.); Global (Canada)

== Voice cast ==
- Billie Mae Richards – Tenderheart Bear, David’s Mother, Sharon Wayland, Keith, Kara's Mother, Matthew Miller
- Jayne Eastwood – Birthday Bear, Tommy, Willis Carter
- Janet-Laine Green – Wish Bear, Mary, Mrs. Miller (Matthew Miller's Mother), Tricia
- Luba Goy – Gentle Heart Lamb, Lotsa Heart Elephant, Susie’s Mother
- Eva Almos – Friend Bear, Swift Heart Rabbit, Cathy, Charlie, Elaine, Jimmy, Kathy, Lisa, Melanie, Millie Jacobs' Mother, Sanford
- Linda Sorenson – Love-a-Lot Bear, Amy, Benny, Jeffrey, Kara, Lisa's Mother, Mrs. Peale (Patti Johnson's Teacher), Paula Schaefer, Sandra, Talking Star, Wendy
- Melleny Brown – Cheer Bear, Becky, Missy, Jill Wayland, Millie Jacobs
- Len Carlson – Professor Coldheart, Jim, Strato Nefarious
- Louise Vallance – Proud Heart Cat, Mary
- Dan Hennessey – Good Luck Bear, Brave Heart Lion, Loyal Heart Dog, Captain McDougal, Cloud Worm, Counselor Bob, Dentist, Mr. Miller (Matthew Miller's Father), Mayor of Abbotsville
- Pauline Rennie – Cozy Heart Penguin, Treat Heart Pig, Melanie’s Mother, Timmy
- Patrice Black – Funshine Bear, Share Bear, Chris, Eddie, Joey, Joey and Elaine's Mother, Linda, Mary’s Mother
- Laurie Waller Benson – Doug, Hal, Jill, Millie Jacobs' Teacher, Murphy, Susie, Talking Star
- Theresa Sears – Bedtime Bear, Champ Bear, Amy, Fred, Joshua
- Bob Dermer – Grumpy Bear, Frostbite, Amy’s Husband, Carl, Charlie, David, Eddie, Firefighter, Joey and Elaine's Father, Ken, Mr. Bland (Mayor of Drab City), Mr. Poole, Narrator, Race Flag Man
- Joyce Gordon – Auntie Freeze

=== Uncredited ===
- Jim Henshaw – Bright Heart Raccoon, Jeff, Ben Wayland, Melanie’s Father, Mr. Johnson (Patti Johnson's Father)
- Marla Lukofsky – Playful Heart Monkey, Patti Johnson
- Brennan Thicke – Joey

== Home media ==
=== United States ===
The series has seen a few VHS releases from Kideo Video (distributed by Karl-Lorimar Home Video), DIC Video (distributed by Promotional Concept Group and Avon Products) and DIC Toon-Time Video (distributed by BMG Kidz and Buena Vista Home Video) throughout the 1980s and 1990s.

In March 2003, Sterling Entertainment released two releases on VHS and DVD: "Bedtime Stories", "The Last Laugh" and a third one: "To the Rescue" in July 2003. Each release contained six or seven episodes, with a bonus episode on the DVD version, while "To the Rescue" contained a bonus Sylvanian Families episode. An additional DVD, "Daydreams", was released on February 4, 2004, and contained a Strawberry Shortcake short as a bonus on the DVD version.

Sterling would later release all 22 episodes in seven-volume collections in 2004 entitled Celebration, Dreamland, Forever Friends, Land of Enchantment, Starry Skies, Tenderheart Tales and Fun in the Sun.

In 2007, 20th Century Fox Home Entertainment acquired the rights to the original DIC series and re-released all the DIC-produced episodes on DVD in five-volume collections entitled Care-A-Lot Adventures, Forest of Feelings, Magical Moments, Carousel of Dreams and Sharing in the Sunshine.

On August 26, 2008, 20th Century Fox Home Entertainment released Care Bears: Care-A-Lot Collection on DVD in Region 1. The two-disc set features all 22 episodes of the series (with its original opening and closing titles).

In 2013, Mill Creek Entertainment acquired the rights to the series and subsequently released three-volume collections which contain six episodes each, on September 10, 2013.

On October 6, 2015, Mill Creek released The Care Bears – The Complete Original Series on DVD in Region 1. The two-disc set features all 22 episodes of the series.

Release	Format	Episodes	Distributor	Release date
Care Bears Save the Day!	VHS/Betamax	Mayor For a Day; The Night the Stars Went Out	Karl-Lorimar Home Video (Kideo Video)	1986
Volume 2	VHS/Betamax	Braces; The Lucky Charm	Karl-Lorimar Home Video (Kideo Video)	1986
Volume 3	VHS/Betamax	Split Decision; Birthday	Karl-Lorimar Home Video (Kideo Video)	1986
Volume 4	VHS/Betamax	Soap Box Derby; Camp	Karl-Lorimar Home Video (Kideo Video)	1986
To the Rescue!	VHS/Betamax	The Lucky Charm; Braces; Split Decision	Karl-Lorimar Home Video (Kideo Video)	1986
And Their Friends!	VHS/Betamax	The Birthday; Camp; Soap Box Derby	Karl-Lorimar Home Video (Kideo Video)	1986
Share the Fun and Adventure!	VHS/Betamax	The Last Laugh; The Show Must Go On; The Forest of Misfortune	Karl-Lorimar Home Video (Kideo Video)	1986
Magical Stories About Caring!	VHS/Betamax	Daydreams; Runaway; The Magic Mirror	Karl-Lorimar Home Video (Kideo Video)	1986
Storybook	VHS/Betamax		Karl-Lorimar Home Video (Kideo Video)	1986
The Last Laugh/The Show Must Go On	VHS	The Last Laugh; The Show Must Go On	Promotional Concept Group (DIC Video)	unknown
They've Got Heart as Big as a Rainbow!	VHS	The Birthday; Camp; Split Decision; The Magic Mirror	DIC Video	1992
The Birthday	VHS	The Birthday; Split Decision	Buena Vista Home Video (DIC Toon-Time Video)	1994
Camp	VHS	Camp; Braces	Buena Vista Home Video (DIC Toon-Time Video)	1994
Bedtime Stories	VHS/DVD	The Night the Stars Went Out; The Magic Shop; Birthday; Lucky Charm; Drab City; The Cloud Worm; The Old Man and the Lighthouse (DVD-exclusive episode)	Sterling Entertainment (DIC Home Entertainment)	March 11, 2003
The Last Laugh	VHS/DVD	The Last Laugh; Soap Box Derby; The Forest of Misfortune; The Girl Who Cried Wolf; Concrete Rain; Mayor for a Day; The Show Must Go On (DVD-exclusive episode)	Sterling Entertainment (DIC Home Entertainment)	March 11, 2003
To the Rescue!	VHS/DVD	The Magic Mirror; Dry Spells; Camp; Braces; Split Decision; Wedding Bells; Sylvanian Families episode (DVD-exclusive)	Sterling Entertainment (DIC Home Entertainment)	July 22, 2003
Daydreams	VHS/DVD	Daydreams; Runaway; The Show Must Go On; The Old Man and the Lighthouse; Strawberry Shortcake - Growing Better all the Time (DVD only)	Sterling Entertainment (DIC Home Entertainment)	February 3, 2004

=== International ===
In the United Kingdom, Maximum Entertainment released the whole DIC series on four DVD sets and two VHS releases under license from Jetix Europe (who at the time owned the international distribution rights to the pre-1990 DIC library).

Volume 1, released in August 2004 contained the first two episodes (1 on the VHS) alongside the Freeze Machine and Land without Feelings specials. Volume 2, released in October 2004 contained five episodes, and The Magic Shop (released in February 2005) and The Girl who Cried Wolf (released in August 2005) each contained three episodes, with the Freeze Machine special appearing on the latter again for an unknown reason, likely as filler. Both sets were released in two compilations titled "Volumes 1 and 2" (released in January 2005) and "Wedding Bells" (Released in 28 November 2005), each containing two discs with their respective volumes.

The separate volumes were re-released again in 2007, with the former two volumes being released simply as Care Bears. Another compilation titled Happy Birthday, Care Bears was released by Maximum in February 2008, containing 12 episodes set within two discs. Lace DVD re-issued the DVDs again in 2011 as well was releasing the entire series in a four-disc boxset. These versions are identical to Maximum's releases.

In 2016, Platform Entertainment would release four DVDs of the series.
