= 1960 in Canada =

- Decades: 1940s; 1950s; 1960s; 1970s; 1980s
- See also: History of Canada; Timeline of Canadian history; List of years in Canada

Events from the year 1960 in Canada.

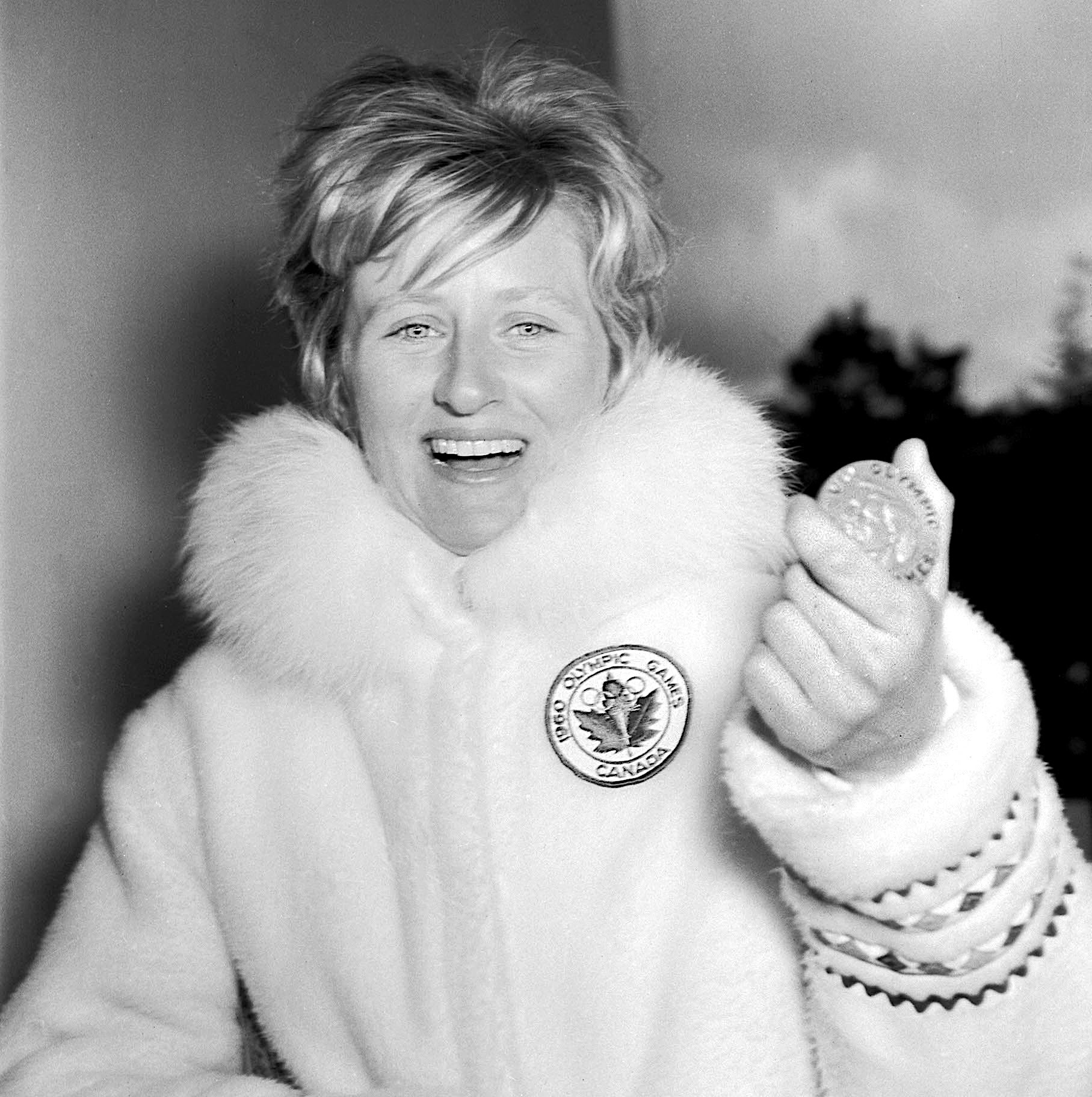
Ann Heggtveit displays her gold medal for slalom skiing, 1960 Winter Olympics

== Incumbents ==
=== Crown ===
- Monarch – Elizabeth II

=== Federal government ===
- Governor General – Georges Vanier
- Prime Minister – John Diefenbaker
- Chief Justice – Patrick Kerwin (Ontario)
- Parliament – 24th

=== Provincial governments ===
==== Lieutenant governors ====
- Lieutenant Governor of Alberta – John Percy Page
- Lieutenant Governor of British Columbia – Frank M. Ross (until October 12) then George Pearkes
- Lieutenant Governor of Manitoba – John S. McDiarmid (until January 15) then Errick Willis
- Lieutenant Governor of New Brunswick – Joseph Leonard O'Brien
- Lieutenant Governor of Newfoundland – Campbell Leonard Macpherson
- Lieutenant Governor of Nova Scotia – Edward Chester Plow
- Lieutenant Governor of Ontario – John Keiller MacKay
- Lieutenant Governor of Prince Edward Island – Frederick Walter Hyndman
- Lieutenant Governor of Quebec – Onésime Gagnon
- Lieutenant Governor of Saskatchewan – Frank Lindsay Bastedo

==== Premiers ====
- Premier of Alberta – Ernest Manning
- Premier of British Columbia – W.A.C. Bennett
- Premier of Manitoba – Dufferin Roblin
- Premier of New Brunswick – Hugh John Flemming (until July 12) then Louis Robichaud
- Premier of Newfoundland – Joey Smallwood
- Premier of Nova Scotia – Robert Stanfield
- Premier of Ontario – Leslie Frost
- Premier of Prince Edward Island – Walter Shaw
- Premier of Quebec – Paul Sauvé (until January 2) then Antonio Barrette (January 8 to July 22) then Jean Lesage
- Premier of Saskatchewan – Tommy Douglas

=== Territorial governments ===
==== Commissioners ====
- Commissioner of Yukon – Frederick Howard Collins
- Commissioner of Northwest Territories – Robert Gordon Robertson

== Events ==
=== January to June ===
- January – The Board of Broadcast Governors begins hearings in Winnipeg to determine alternatives to CBC Television. Hearings are conducted throughout the country. Eventually, numerous licences are given to: Halifax—the Finlay MacDonald group—CJCH-TV; Montreal—the Canadian Marconi Co.—CFCF-TV; Ottawa—Ernie Bushnell's group—CJOH-TV; Toronto—Baton—the Bassett group—CFTO-TV; Winnipeg—Ralph S. Misener & Associates—CJAY-TV (CKY-TV); Edmonton—the CBC (CBXT), (which would relieve CFRN-TV of its CBC affiliation); Calgary—the Love organization—CFCN-TV; Vancouver—the Vantel group—CHAN-TV (BCTV).
- January 2 – Paul Sauvé, Premier of Quebec, dies in office.
- January 8 – Antonio Barrette becomes premier of Quebec.
- April 24 – Television station CBWFT signs on for the first time as Radio-Canada Winnipeg.
- June 8 – Saskatchewan election: Tommy Douglas's Co-operative Commonwealth Federation wins a fifth consecutive majority.
- June 22 – 1960 Quebec general election: Barrette's ruling Union nationale, is defeated by the Quebec Liberal Party, led by Jean Lesage, beginning the 'Quiet Revolution' in the historically conservative province.
- June 27 – 1960 New Brunswick general election: The Liberals, led by Louis Robichaud defeat the Progressive Conservative government of Hugh John Flemming.

=== July to December ===
- July 1 – Status Indians are given the right to vote.
- July 9 – Seven-year-old Roger Woodward became the first person accidentally to fall over the Horseshoe Falls and survive.
- July 12 – Louis Robichaud becomes premier of New Brunswick, replacing Hugh John Flemming.
- July 22 – Queen Elizabeth II grants former Governor General Vincent Massey the Royal Victorian Chain, becoming the first Canadian to receive the award.
- July 25–27 – The first First Ministers conference is held.
- August 10 – The Canadian Bill of Rights is given royal assent.
- September – York University's first class begins learning.
- September 19 – The University of Calgary is founded.
- December 17 – Quebec becomes the last province to agree to the National Health Act.

=== Full date unknown ===
- French beginning to be recognized as language taught in schools outside of Quebec
- L'Anse aux Meadows, evidence of Viking colonization of North America is discovered in Newfoundland
- The Ford Frontenac is introduced exclusively to the Canadian market.

== Arts and literature ==
- February 16 – The new National Gallery of Canada building opens in Ottawa.
- November 2 – The National Theatre School opens in Montreal.

=== New books ===
- Milton Acorn: Against a League of Liars
- Farley Mowat: Ordeal by Ice
- Gordon R. Dickson: Necromancer

=== Awards ===
- See 1960 Governor General's Awards for a complete list of winners and finalists for those awards.
- Stephen Leacock Award: Pierre Berton, Just Add Water and Stir

== Sport ==
- January 16 – Gordie Howe becomes the leading scorer in National Hockey League history, passing Maurice Richard.
- April 14 – The Montreal Canadiens win their 12th (fifth consecutive) Stanley Cup by defeating the Toronto Maple Leafs 4 games to 0. The deciding game (as well being Maurice Richard's final game) was played in Maple Leaf Gardens in Toronto
- May 8 – The Ontario Hockey Association's St. Catharines Teepees win their second (and final) Memorial Cup by defeating the Central Alberta Hockey League's Edmonton Oil Kings 4 games to 2. The deciding Game 6 was played at Maple Leaf Gardens in Toronto
- October 6 – Maurice Richard's number (9) is retired by the Montreal Canadiens in a ceremony at the Montreal Forum
- November 26 – The Ottawa Rough Riders win their fifth Grey Cup by defeating the Edmonton Eskimos 16 to 6 in the 48th Grey Cup played at Vancouver's Empire Stadium. Toronto's Ron Stewart became the first Canadian to win the game's official MVP award.

== Births ==
=== January to June ===
- January 12 – Oliver Platt, actor
- January 24 – Mark Reeds, Canadian-American ice hockey player and coach (d. 2015)
- February 11 – Grant Main, rower and Olympic gold medalist
- February 12 – George Elliott Clarke, poet and playwright
- February 14 – Walt Poddubny, ice hockey player and coach (d. 2009)
- February 14 – Meg Tilly, actress and dancer
- February 17 – Lindy Ruff, ice hockey player and coach
- February 28 – Dorothy Stratten, model, actress and murder victim (d. 1980)
- March 7 – Gail Greenough, equestrian
- March 13 - John Greyson, filmmaker
- March 15 – Carole Rouillard, long-distance runner
- March 18 - Guy Carbonneau, retired professional ice hockey player
- April 8 - Pat Duncan, politician and sixth (and first female) Premier of Yukon and the first Liberal government
- April 10 – Drew Caldwell, politician
- April 12 - Toren Smith, manga publisher and translator (d. 2013)
- April 20 - Eria Fachin, pop singer
- April 29 – Robert J. Sawyer, science fiction writer
- May 3 – Jennifer Luce, architect
- May 8 - Patrick McKenna, actor
- May 11 - Gildor Roy, actor

=== July to December ===
- July 5 – Brad Loree, actor and stuntman
- July 19
  - Atom Egoyan, filmmaker
  - Raymond Laflamme, physicist (d. 2025)
- July 22 – Jane Patterson, judoka
- July 25 – Alain Robidoux, snooker player
- July 28 – Anna Marie Malone, long-distance runner
- July 31 – Dale Hunter, ice hockey player and coach
- August 23 – Chris Potter, actor
- August 27 – Mike Mahovlich, javelin thrower
- August 30
  - Mark Eyking, politician
  - Guy A. Lepage, actor
- September 14 – Callum Keith Rennie, actor
- September 21 – David James Elliott, actor
- September 25 - Sonia Benezra, TV and radio interviewer and personality and actress
- October 8 - François Pérusse, comedian and humor
- November 2 – Paul Martini, pair skater
- November 6 – Kevin Neufeld, rower and Olympic gold medallist
- November 8
  - Anne Dorval, actress
  - Robert Libman, politician, architect and leader of Equality Party
- November 20 - Marc Labrèche, actor, comedian and host
- December 23 – Sass Jordan, rock singer (d. 2026)
- December 28 – Ray Bourque, ice hockey player

== Deaths ==
=== January to June ===
- January 2 – Paul Sauvé, lawyer, soldier, politician and 17th Premier of Quebec (b. 1907)
- February 16 – James Alexander Murray, politician and Premier of New Brunswick (b. 1864)
- February 22 – Paul-Émile Borduas, painter (b. 1905)
- June 13 – Brooke Claxton, politician and Minister (b. 1898)

=== July to December ===
- July 26 – Maud Menten, medical scientist (b. 1879)
- August 5 – Arthur Meighen, politician and 9th Prime Minister of Canada (b. 1874)
- November 5 – Mack Sennett, actor, producer, screenwriter and film director (b. 1880)
- December 12 – Louis Orville Breithaupt, 18th Lieutenant Governor of Ontario (b. 1890)
- December 19 – Jean Désy, diplomat (b. 1893)
- December 29 – Philippe Panneton, physician, academic, diplomat and writer (b. 1895)
- December 31 – C. D. Howe, politician and Minister (b. 1886)

== See also ==
- 1960 in Canadian television
- List of Canadian films
