= Junior Roundup =

- Written by: Cliff Braggins; Michael Spivak
- Presented by: Murray Westgate
- Country of origin: Canada
- Original language: English
- No. of seasons: 1

Production
- Producer: Doug Davidson
- Running time: 60 minutes

Original release
- Network: CBC Television
- Release: 17 October 1960 – 3 July 1961

Junior Roundup is a Canadian children's television program that aired on CBC Television from 1960 to 1961.

== Premise ==
This series consisted of segments on a variety of topics. The first quarter-hour, Bantam Roundup, was geared towards the youngest schoolchildren as it rebroadcast episodes of other CBC children's shows. The remaining three-quarters of the episode consisted of programming for older children, including performance segments, game and quiz segments and rebroadcasts of other series.

== Scheduling ==
This hour-long series was broadcast weekdays at 4:30 p.m. (Eastern) from 17 October 1960 to 3 July 1961.

Episodes followed this daily format until May 1961:

Day of week	Bantam Roundup segment (15 min)	Youth segment (45 min)
Mondays	The Friendly Giant	This game and telephone contest segment was regularly hosted by Dave Broadfoot and Jean Templeton
Tuesdays	Maggie Muggins	This Living World, with frequent guests John Lunn (Royal Ontario Museum) and Percy Saltzman (who discussed developments in space travel)
Wednesdays	The Friendly Giant	Sing Ring Around (Winnipeg music series, featuring folk and country genres), Sea Songs and Stories (Halifax historical series)
Thursdays	Just Mary	Artistic performances such as ballet, concerts and drama
Fridays	The Friendly Giant	Tidewater Tramp (adventure series) and "Your World This Week" (newscast)

In the final two months of the series, Westgate appeared less often (seen only on the Monday and Wednesday episodes). Newer features were introduced, particularly on Thursdays and Fridays, including episodes of Caravan. Doug Davidson continued to produce episodes except on Mondays (when Bill Davidson took over) and on Fridays. Segments hosted by Broadfoot, Templeton and Westgate were videotaped on location at summer camps.
