= Inquiry (disambiguation) =

Inquiry, also spelt enquiry, is any process that has the aim of augmenting knowledge, resolving doubt, or solving a problem.

The Inquiry was a study group to prepare materials for the peace negotiations following World War I.

Enquiry, inquiry, or The Inquiry may also refer to:

== Film and television ==
- The Inquiry (1986 film), an Italian historical drama
- The Inquiry (2006 film), a historical drama
- Inquiry (TV series), a Canadian current affairs television series
- Inquiry, a 1967 Indian short animated film by C. T. Baptista, winner of the National Film Award for Best Non-Feature Animation Film

== Publications ==
- Inquiry (health journal)
- Inquiry (magazine), a libertarian magazine
- "The Inquiry" (short story), a short story by Alexander Kuprin
- Inquiry: An Interdisciplinary Journal of Philosophy, a philosophy journal established in 1958 and published by Routledge
- Inquiry: Critical Thinking Across the Disciplines, a philosophy journal established in 1988 by the Institute for Critical Thinking

== Other uses ==
- Enquiry character, a transmission-control character in computer communications
- Public inquiry, also known simply as an inquiry, an official review of events or actions ordered by a government body

== See also ==
- The Inquirer, a former British technology website
- Inquiry-based learning
