= Sunny Besen Thrasher =

Canadian actor

Sunny Thrasher
- Born: Sunny Besean Thrasher; December 13, 1976 (age 49); Toronto, Ontario, Canada
- Occupation: Actor
- Years active: 1982–1995
- Parent: Joan Besen

Sunny Besen Thrasher (born December 13, 1976) is a Canadian former child actor who starred as Paul Edison in Nelvana's live-action series The Edison Twins, and supplied voices in the first two Care Bears movies. He is the son of Prairie Oyster keyboardist and Canadian songwriter Joan Besen.

He also played Max in both the film and TV series of My Pet Monster and voiced Reggie Mantle in The New Archies as well as several characters in the Care Bears television show, Garbage Pail Kids, Ultraforce and Babar.

Sunny has also guest-appeared in several television shows such as Katts and Dog, Alfred Hitchcock Presents and Maniac Mansion.

His play The Takeover Clause was produced by Open Mind Productions at the Annex Theatre in Toronto.

== Filmography ==
- The Edison Twins (1982)
- Hangin' In (1985)
- The Care Bears Movie (1985)
- Care Bears Movie II: A New Generation (1986)
- My Pet Monster The Movie (1986)
- Alfred Hitchcock Presents (1987)
- Garbage Pail Kids (1987)
- Home Alone: A Kid's Guide To Playing It Safe When On Your Own (1987)
- My Pet Monster (1987)
- The New Archies (1987)
- The Beachcombers (1988)
- T. and T. (1988)
- Babar (1989)
- Katts and Dog (1990)
- Maniac Mansion (1993)
- Exploring Ontario's Provincial Parks (1993)
- Kung Fu: The Legend Continues (1994)
- Ultraforce (1995)
