= The Edison Twins =

Canadian children's television program

- Created by: Michael Hirsh; Patrick Loubert
- Starring: Andrew Sabiston; Marnie McPhail; Sunny Besen Thrasher
- Composers: Patricia Cullen; John J. Weisman
- Country of origin: Canada
- Original language: English
- No. of seasons: 6
- No. of episodes: 78

Production
- Executive producers: Patrick Loubert; Michael Hirsh; Clive A. Smith
- Running time: 30 minutes
- Production company: Nelvana

Original release
- Network: CBC Television
- Release: March 3, 1984 – December 17, 1986

The Edison Twins is a Canadian children's television program which ran for six seasons on CBC Television from March 3, 1984, to December 17, 1986. The Disney Channel also picked up the rights in the mid-1980s. Six seasons were co-produced by Nelvana Limited and Canada Films.

== Synopsis ==
The series stars Andrew Sabiston and Marnie McPhail as fraternal twins Tom and Annie Edison, Sunny Besen Thrasher as their mischievous little brother Paul, and Milan Cheylov as their bumbling friend Lance Howard. Brian George stars as their police officer friend Sgt. Paganee. The show focused on the adventures of the main cast as they stumbled onto one problem after another, using Tom and Annie's scientific wit to solve the situation.

In later seasons, Corey Haim joined the shows as recurring character Larry.

Many episodes end with a short animated sequence illustrating a key scientific principle demonstrated in the preceding live action story.

The last name of "Edison" is a homage to the inventor Thomas Edison.

== Cast ==
- Andrew Sabiston as Tom Edison
- Marnie McPhail as Annie Edison
- Sunny Besen Thrasher as Paul Edison

== Episodes ==
=== Season 1 (1984) ===
No. overall	No. in season	Title	Directed by	Written by	Original release date
1	1	"The Code Affair"	Paul Shapiro	Paul Shapiro, Jack Blum, Patrick Loubert & Ian McDougall	March 3, 1984
2	2	"Phantom of the Auditorium"	Zale Dalen	David Carol, Sondra Kelly & Peter Sauder	March 17, 1984
3	3	"Dogs"	Paul Shapiro	Paul Shapiro & Patrick Loubert & Ian McDougall	April 7, 1984
4	4	"Rock 'n' Roll Anniversary"	Zale Dalen	David Carol & Peter Sauder	April 21, 1984
5	5	"Voice from Beyond"	Zale Dalen	Michael Hirsh, Patrick Loubert & Elaine Waisglass	May 5, 1984
6	6	"Over the Rainbow"	Zale Dalen	David Carol, Zale Dalen, Patrick Loubert & Ian McDougall	May 19, 1984
7	7	"The Delinquent"	Paul Shapiro	David Carol, Paul Shapiro & Elaine Waisglass	June 2, 1984
8	8	"Diamonds"	René Bonnière	René Bonnière, Sondra Kelly, Patrick Loubert & Ian McDougall	June 16, 1984
9	9	"UFO"	Paul Shapiro	David Carol, Paul Shapiro & Elaine Waisglass	July 7, 1984
10	10	"The Race"	René Bonnière	René Bonnière, Alan Swayze, Patrick Loubert & Ian McDougall	July 21, 1984
11	11	"Monster on the Bluffs"	Zale Dalen	David Carol & Zale Dalen	August 4, 1984
12	12	"Twinners"	Paul Shapiro	Paul Shapiro, Jack Blum, Patrick Loubert & Ian McDougall	August 18, 1984
13	13	"Robot"	René Bonnière	Peter Sauder, David Carol, Patrick Loubert & Ian McDougall	September 1, 1984

=== Season 2 (1984–85) ===
No. overall	No. in season	Title	Directed by	Written by	Original release date
14	1	"Snakes and Ladders"	Ron Kelly	Sondra Kelly, David Young & Scott Barrie	September 15, 1984
15	2	"A Penny Saved"	Allan Eastman	Sondra Kelly, Steve Wright & Scott Barrie	October 6, 1984
16	3	"Ghosts for Sale"	Allan Eastman	Sondra Kelly, Scott Barrie & Paul Ledoux	October 20, 1984
17	4	"Enemy of Weston"	Ron Kelly	Sondra Kelly, Elaine Waisglass & Scott Barrie	November 3, 1984
18	5	"Double Trouble"	Clive A. Smith	Steve Wright	November 17, 1984
19	6	"Blow Up"	Mario Azzopardi	Sondra Kelly, David Young & Scott Barrie	December 1, 1984
20	7	"Mars to Paul"	Mario Azzopardi	Sondra Kelly, Bruce Martin & Scott Barrie	December 15, 1984
21	8	"Boom Boom Edison"	Eric Till	Sondra Kelly, Elaine Waisglass & Bruce Martin	January 5, 1985
22	9	"Team Rubberknees"	Mario Azzopardi	Steve Wright & Bruce Martin	January 19, 1985
23	10	"Go Fly a Kite"	Ron Kelly	Sondra Kelly, Susan Snooks & Scott Barrie	February 2, 1985
24	11	"Dark Horse"	Ron Kelly	Sondra Kelly, David Young & Patrick Loubert	February 16, 1985
25	12	"Alive or Dead"	Ron Kelly	Sondra Kelly, David Young & Patrick Loubert	March 2, 1985
26	13	"Rescue at Sea"	Ron Kelly	Sondra Kelly, David Young & Patrick Loubert	March 16, 1985

=== Season 3 (1985) ===
No. overall	No. in season	Title	Directed by	Written by	Original release date
27	1	"Bases Loaded...One Girl Out"	Don Haldane	Joan Besen, David Eames & Paul Ledoux	April 6, 1985
28	2	"Running on Empty"	Alan Simmonds	Sondra Kelly, Scott Barrie & Paul Ledoux	April 20, 1985
29	3	"Let Them Eat Cake"	Mario Azzopardi	David Eames, Bruce Martin & Susan Snooks	May 4, 1985
30	4	"Monkey in the Middle"	Alan F. Simmonds	Joan Besen, David Eames & Paul Ledoux	May 18, 1985
31	5	"Everyone a Rembrandt"	Clive A. Smith	Joan Besen, David Eames & Paul Ledoux	June 1, 1985
32	6	"Darkness at Noon"	Timothy Bond	David Young, David Eames & Susan Snooks	June 15, 1985
33	7	"Home Sweet Home"	Clive A. Smith	Joan Besen, David Eames & Andrew Sabiston	July 6, 1985
34	8	"Robbers and Robots"	Peter Rowe	Joan Besen, David Eames & Paul Ledoux	July 20, 1985
35	9	"Mind and Body"	Scott Barrie	David Young, David Eames & Susan Snooks	August 4, 1985
36	10	"My House is Your House"	Timothy Bond	Joan Besen & Susan Snooks	August 17, 1985
37	11	"The Case of the Missing Guitar"	Mario Azzopardi	Bruce Martin, Susan Snooks & Joan Besen	September 1, 1985
38	12	"The Case of the Odd Job"	Mario Azzopardi	Bruce Martin, Susan Snooks & Joan Besen	September 21, 1985
39	13	"The Final Mystery"	Mariio Azzopardi	Bruce Martin, Susan Snooks & Joan Besen	October 5, 1985

=== Season 4 (1985–86) ===
No. overall	No. in season	Title	Directed by	Written by	Original release date
40	1	"The Fix"	Donald Shebib	David Young, Susan Snooks & Joan Besen	October 19, 1985
41	2	"Water Witch"	Peter Rowe	Joan Besen, Paul Ledoux & Susan Snooks	November 2, 1985
42	3	"The Mole People"	Harvey Frost	David Young, Susan Snooks & Joan Besen	November 16, 1985
43	4	"All That Glitters"	Don Haldane	Scott Barrie, Susan Snooks & Joan Besen	December 7, 1985
44	5	"Star-Crossed Lovers"	Timothy Bond	David Young, Susan Snooks & Joan Besen	December 21, 1985
45	6	"Heavy Sweat"	Alan Simmonds	David Young, Susan Snooks & Joan Besen	January 4, 1986
46	7	"What Goes Up"	Timothy Bond	Scott Barrie, Susan Snooks & Joan Besen	January 18, 1986
47	8	"Chips and Choppers"	Alan Simmonds	Joan Besen, Steve DiMarco & Susan Snooks	February 1, 1986
48	9	"Strictly for the Birds"	Steve DiMarco	Joan Besen, Robert Sax & Susan Snooks	February 15, 1986
49	10	"The Live One"	Timothy Bond	Joan Besen, B. Mohun & B. Murtagh	March 15, 1986
50	11	"Survival of the Fittest"	Donald Shebib	Joan Besen, Paul Ledoux & Susan Snooks	April 9, 1986
51	12	"Gone with the Windigo"	Donald Shebib	Joan Besen, Paul Ledoux & Susan Snooks	April 16, 1986
52	13	"The Secret of Windigo Lake"	Donald Shebib	Joan Besen, Paul Ledoux & Susan Snooks	April 23, 1986

=== Season 5 (1986) ===
No. overall	No. in season	Title	Directed by	Written by	Original release date
53	1	"One Good Con..."	Don Haldane	Scott Barrie, Joan Besen & Susan Snooks	April 30, 1986
54	2	"Racer's Edge"	Scott Barrie	Joan Besen, Paul Ledoux & Susan Snooks	May 7, 1986
55	3	"Smile for the Camera"	Al Waxman	Joan Besen, Susan Snooks & David Young	May 14, 1986
56	4	"Tarantula Blues"	Timothy Bond	Joan Besen, Susan Snooks & David Young	May 21, 1986
57	5	"The Case of the Friendly Fugitive"	Don Haldane	Joan Besen, Robert Sax & Susan Snooks	May 28, 1986
58	6	"Gems and Jelly Beans"	Don Haldane	Joan Besen, Robert Sax & Susan Snooks	June 4, 1986
59	7	"The Maharajah of Weston"	Don Haldane	Joan Besen, Robert Sax & Susan Snooks	June 11, 1986
60	8	"Video Vengeance"	Steve DiMarco	Joan Besen, Susan Snooks & David Young	June 18, 1986
61	9	"Tinker Tom"	Timothy Bond	Joan Besen, Paul Ledoux & Susan Snooks	June 25, 1986
62	10	"Pizza Poltergeist"	Alan Simmonds	Joan Besen, Susan Snooks & David Young	July 2, 1986
63	11	"Invitation to a Mystery"	Scott Barrie	Joan Besen, Susan Snooks and Steve Wright	July 9, 1986
64	12	"Lance's Luck"	Alan Simmonds	Joan Besen, Guy Mullally & Susan Snooks	September 3, 1986
65	13	"One Way Ticket"	Scott LaBarge	Joan Besen, Guy Mullally & Susan Snooks	September 10, 1986

=== Season 6 (1986) ===
No. overall	No. in season	Title	Directed by	Written by	Original release date
66	1	"The Mystery of the Maze"	Donald Shebib	Guy Mullally	September 17, 1986
67	2	"The Initiation"	Timothy Bond	Guy Mullally & David Young	September 24, 1986
68	3	"Illegal Procedure"	Donald Shebib	Guy Mullally & David Young	October 1, 1986
69	4	"The People's Choice"	Steve DiMarco	Guy Mullally & Paul Ledoux	October 8, 1986
70	5	"The Revenge of the Plants"	Timothy Bond	Guy Mullally & David Young	October 15, 1986
71	6	"Supersalesman"	Don Haldane	Guy Mullally & Dick Oleksiak	October 22, 1986
72	7	"The Legacy of Bayfield Downs"	Scott LaBarge	Scott Barrie & Susan Snooks	November 5, 1986
73	8	"Money for Nothing"	Don Haldane	Guy Mullally & David Young	November 12, 1986
74	9	"The Golden Goose Chase"	Donald Shebib	Guy Mullally & David Young	November 19, 1986
75	10	"How to Haunt a Haunted House"	Stan Olsen	Paul Ledoux & Guy Mullally	November 26, 1986
76	11	"A Message for Triton"	Timothy Bond	Gregor Hutchinson & Guy Mullally	December 3, 1986
77	12	"The Continental Twist"	Harvey Frost	Scott Barrie & Guy Mullally	December 10, 1986
78	13	"Vows from the Deep"	Donald Shebib	David Young & Guy Mullally	December 17, 1986
