= Just Mary =

- Genre: Children's television series
- Created by: Mary Grannan
- Written by: Mary Grannan
- Country of origin: Canada
- Original language: English
- No. of seasons: 2

Production
- Producer: Paddy Sampson
- Production location: Toronto
- Running time: 15 minutes

Original release
- Network: CBC Television
- Release: 7 April – 29 December 1960

Related
- Just Mary (CBC radio series, 1939–1962)

Just Mary is a Canadian children's television series that aired on CBC Television in 1960.

== Premise ==
Mary Grannan narrated stories based on her Just Mary books in this Toronto-produced series while puppets and human actors performed the storylines. Actors seen in the series included Barbara Hamilton and Toby Tarnow, while voices for puppets operated by John and Linda Keogh were provided by actors such as Roberta Maxwell, Douglas Rain, Pauline Rennie and Ruth Springford.

Featured stories included "The Chinese Bracelet", "Dolly Petticoats", "Golden Shoes", "The Little Good Arrow", "Penny Pink" and "The Princely Pig".

== Scheduling ==
This 15-minute series was broadcast Thursdays at 4:30 p.m. (Eastern) from 7 April to 30 June 1960 for its first run. Its second run was part of the Junior Roundup brand of weekday children's series and again aired in the Thursday 4:30 p.m. time slot from 20 October to 29 December 1960.
