= Marla Lukofsky =

Canadian-American comedian

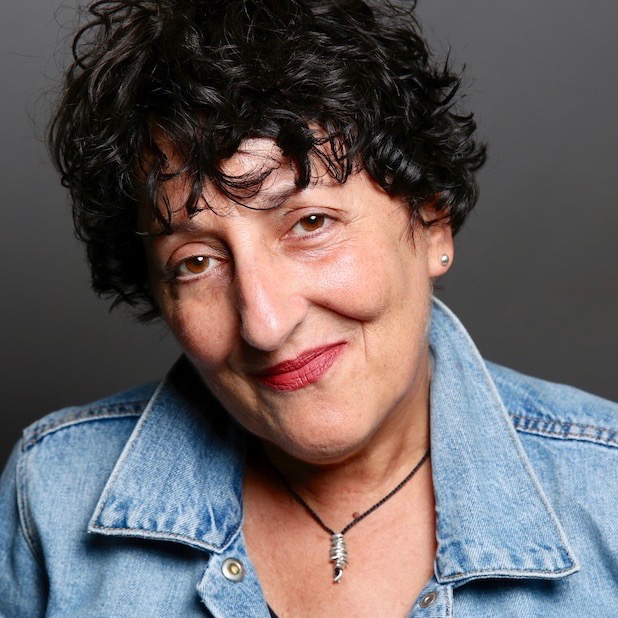
- Born: Marla Lukofsky; Toronto, Ontario, Canada
- Citizenship: United States, Canada
- Education: Seneca College
- Occupations: Stand-up comedian, actor, singer, writer, speaker
- Years active: 1973–present
- Website: www.marlalukofsky.com

Marla Lukofsky (born July 3) is a Canadian-American stand-up comedian, actress, singer, writer and keynote speaker. She is one of the pioneers of stand-up comedy in Canada and has performed in every major city in North America, the UK and the first female comedian to headline in Bermuda.

Lukofsky has appeared in a variety of TV shows including An Evening at the Improv with Elliott Gould, The Palace TV Variety Series with Jack Jones and The Alan Thicke Show as well as starring in feature films such as Honeymoon with Nathalie Baye and John Shea and Zero Patience.

Lukofsky was a regular radio columnist on The Vicki Gabereau Show and CBC's 'Basic Black' with host Arthur Black and became the regular last word columnist on CBC's national TV news show Midday with Keith Morrison and Valerie Pringle completing 100 segments. She has voiced in many cartoon series, including the Care Bears TV series and movies, Alf Tales, Super Mario Bros., Pecola, Rupert the Bear and Fugget About It.

== Early life ==
Lukofsky was born in Toronto, Ontario to Ruth and Louis Lukofsky and has two sisters.

== Career ==
Lukofsky started her career in 1973 as a funny folk singer at the famed Riverboat in Toronto and performed at every folk club in Toronto. In 1975, she became a regular at a new comedy club called 'The Improv' with Gene Taylor, along with other regulars, including Rick Moranis and Martin Short.

By 1978, Lukofsky became a regular headliner at Mark Breslin's Yuk Yuk's comedy chain and toured Canada – sharing the bill with Jim Carrey and Howie Mandel. She was briefly a member of Toronto's The Second City touring company but preferred the nightclub circuit and returned to the road.

For three consecutive years, 1985–1987, the PROCAN Music Awards had Lukofsky and John Roberts, host their awards event. In 1990, Lukofsky moved to Los Angeles and played a variety of nightclubs, sharing the bill with comedian Sherri Shepherd at West Hollywood's 'The Rose Tattoo' Cabaret and other establishments.

In 2015, Lukofsky began singing jazz in Toronto, combining her comedy skills with her vocal talents and in 2016 was featured in the TD Toronto Jazz Festival.

== Television ==
Year	Title	Role	Notes
1981	Rubberface	Donna Cherry	Co-star
1984	The Get Along Gang	Bingo Beaver (voice) - Pilot	
1985	Midday	Last Word Columnist	100 episodes
1985	Care Bears	Playful Heart Monkey / Patti Johnson (voices)	Uncredited
1986	The Care Bears Family	Good Luck Bear / Playful Heart Monkey (voices)	Series regular
1986	The Magical World of Disney: Young Again	Suzanne	guest star
1987	The Magic School Bus	voice actor	
1987	Starcom: The U.S. Space Force	voice actor role of Lianna	Series guest
1987	Sylvanian Families	voice actor role of Tracy, Prissy Thistlethorn, Willow, Jerry	Series various guest voices
1987	Seeing Things	various co-starring roles	
1988–1989	ALF Tales	voice actor	Series regular
1989	The Super Mario Bros. Super Show!	voice actor	Series regular
1989	The Twilight Zone revised version	Principal role	
1990	T. and T. starring Mr. T	Brenda	co-star
1995	Rupert	Phoebe (Voice)	
2001–2002	Doc	Meribeth Weatherbeater	guest star, 1 episode
2001–2002	Pecola	Series regular voice actor	
2004	Care Bears: Forever Friends	Playful Heart Monkey, Good Luck Bear (voice)	
2011	Scaredy Squirrel	Voice actor	Series regular
2012	Fugget About It	Rosalie (voice)	Series guest

== Films ==
Year	Title	Role	Notes
1985	Honeymoon	Sally	Co-star
1985	The Care Bears Movie	Good Luck Bear / Playful Heart Monkey (voices)	Co-star
1986	The Care Bears Movie II: A New Generation	Playful Heart Monkey (voice)	Co-star
1987	The Care Bears Adventure in Wonderland	Good Luck Bear (voice)	Co-star
1993	Zero Patience	African Green Monkey	Co-star
