= List of Care Bears episodes =

Care Bears, the original television series, aired in the United States and Canada between 1985 and 1988 (with two specials broadcast prior to the regular run). Episodes aired on ABC in the United States, on Global (ATV & ASN in Atlantic Canada) in Canada, and also in broadcast syndication. The series is based on the American Greetings franchise of the same name.

== Series overview ==
Season	Episodes	Originally released		
Season	Episodes	First released	Last released	Network
Specials	2	April 22, 1983	April 6, 1984	N/A
DIC series	11	September 14, 1985	November 23, 1985	Syndication
1	13	September 13, 1986	December 6, 1986	ABC (U.S.)
2	6	September 26, 1987	October 31, 1987	ABC (U.S.)
3	30	September 12, 1988	November 25, 1988	Syndication (U.S.); Global (Canada)

== Atkinson Film-Arts specials (1983–84) ==
In 1983, Atkinson Film-Arts of Ottawa produced the first two Care Bears specials.

No.	Title	Written by	Original release date
S1	"The Care Bears in the Land Without Feelings"	Ken Sobol	April 22, 1983 (Los Angeles, California)
S2	"The Care Bears Battle the Freeze Machine"	Peter Sauder	April 6, 1984 (Los Angeles, California)

== DIC series (1985) ==
DIC Enterprises produced an 11-episode series, which aired in 1985. Takes place after The Care Bears Movie.

No. overall	No. in season	Title	Original release date
1	1	"Camp / Birthday"	September 14, 1985
Camp: During summertime, a group of children are preparing for summer camp along with their counselor, which the Care Bears join in on. Two boys, Sanford and Murphy, have been assigned to the same tent, but they think differently. With a little help from the Care Bears, the boys learn that people who are different can sometimes make the best friendships. Birthday: Matthew Miller is upset when (to him) his parents forgot his birthday because of the arrival of a new sibling; out of anger (and a little persuasion from his friend Eddie), they plan on wrecking the house. But, with a little help from the Care Bears and Care Bear Cousins, Matthew learns the joy of having a baby sister.
2	2	"Braces / Split Decision"	September 21, 1985
Braces: Joey feels embarrassed about having braces; the Care Bears (along with his friend Missy) attempt to convince him otherwise. Split Decision: Carl (a bespectacled boy) is teased by bullies because of his poor performance in soccer; the Care Bears (as well as his friend Mary) show support for Carl, and join his team in a soccer game.
3	3	"The Lucky Charm / Soap Box Derby"	September 28, 1985
Lucky Charm: Proud Heart Cat is so upset that Playful Heart Monkey is disrupting everything; later, she and the other Care Bear Family members rush to the aid of an unlucky girl named Mildred Jacobs (also known as "Jinx Jacobs"), who is worried about her streak of bad luck. Soap Box Derby: The Care Bears view a go-kart race where two boys (named Willis Carter and Benny) brag about their racecar to two girls named Cathy and Trisha (who are often teased). The girls build a car out of an old crate and decorate it (with the help of the Care Bears), forcing the boys to cheat.
4	4	"The Last Laugh / The Show Must Go On"	October 5, 1985
The Last Laugh: Cheer Bear is so depressed that she loses her "cheer" trying to cheer Grumpy Bear up because of his severe grump. When the other Care Bears and the Care Bear Cousins notice this, they try to cheer both of them up by putting on a comedy show called "Laugh Night". It has no effect on Grumpy, but it makes Cheer feel better for a few tries and they leave the show. Swift Heart Rabbit convinces her that when anyone cares, nobody gives up, so in her final try, she makes Grumpy Bear feel better by giving him heart-shaped flowers which helps him smile and make the clouds whiter. The Show Must Go On: Patty Johnson, who is dressed as a ballerina, is excited to perform in the school play, but can't do so without seeing her dad in the audience, whom she expected to show up. While the Care Bears attempt to cheer her up, the Care Bear Cousins help her father leave work early and manage to make his boss feel nicer. (Q-Taro from Obake no Q-taro makes a cameo appearance as an I.D. Card inside Patty’s Father’s suitcase)
5	5	"The Forest of Misfortune / Magic Mirror"	October 12, 1985
The Forest of Misfortune: The Care Bears and Care Bear Cousins are having a great time in the Forest of Feelings. The fun is spoiled when Professor Coldheart and Frostbite plan to freeze this place, but instead of attacking the Care Bear Family, He places a fortune-telling machine in the forest. When they try it out, Love-a-lot Bear reads the fortunes that tell them something good. She also reads a message found in a bottle. Bedtime Bear warns the other Care Bears and their Cousins that the forest is almost frozen and they all save it (and Treat Heart Pig) by using the Care Bear Stare and Cousin Call, which cause Professor Coldheart and Frostbite to retreat. Magic Mirror: Professor Coldheart invents a magic mirror that turns things into the opposite of what they normally are (i.e, Brave Heart would become cowardly, Grumpy Bear would become happy). Meanwhile, a member of a volleyball team is convinced that there are monsters in her closet, and the Care Bears must convince her otherwise.
6	6	"Daydreams / Runaway"	October 19, 1985
Daydream: The Care Bear Cousins visit Melanie, a young girl who likes to daydream. With their help, Melanie learns when it's appropriate to daydream and when it's best to focus, especially when Professor Coldheart and Frostbite arrive to capture all the Cousins. Runaway: Cara doesn't want to go to her Aunt Helen's house, and threatens to run away from home. The Care Bears convince Cara that running away from home is wrong, and while they fail initially, Cara apologizes for her actions, and says they shouldn't worry. This turns out to be a lie, as she leaves home and wanders the streets. Later, she comes across a carnival, where Professor Coldheart is kidnapping other runaway children.
7	7	"Mayor for a Day / The Night the Stars Went Out"	October 26, 1985
Mayor for a Day: It is a special day for the local children to decide who is the mayor of a town. Professor Coldheart hopes to be mayor, so he and Frostbite cheat and rig the votes so that he wins, and can wreak havoc upon Abbottsville. The Night the Stars Went Out: It is a glorious night for the Care Bears to look at the stars in Care-a-Lot. As Wish Bear is trying to make a wish, one of the talking stars is stolen along with the others by a cloud with a violinist inside.
8	8	"The Magic Shop / Concrete Rain"	November 2, 1985
The Magic Shop: The Bears help Wendy, a blond-haired girl who meets Professor Coldheart at a magic shop with the power of caring. Concrete Rain: Professor Coldheart plans to cover the world with cold, hard cement, and Suzy, who wishes there were more concrete on which to rollerskate, becomes his unwitting helper.
9	9	"Dry Spell / Drab City"	November 9, 1985
Dry Spell: It is a hot day, and two children, Elaine and Joey, are upset because there is no water. Share Bear, with a lighting helmet on her head, meets them inside a cavern. She and the other Care Bears help the kids escape by using the Care Bear Stare; outside, Proud Heart Cat and Swift Heart Rabbit help the others with the Cousin Call. Drab City: When some of the Care Bears and Care Bear Cousins see a city turn night, they try to care for the people who feel the same thing and refuse to say what is good. However, a girl named Jill, who is night, unlike the other citizens, asks the Care Bear Family if they can make the city night again before they all lose their night. It fails as the rest of the Care Bears and Care Bear Cousins arrive, so they use the Care Bear Stare and Cousin Call to restore their night sun and put the rainbow crystal into the pit to make the entire city sun again.
10	10	"Wedding Bells / The Old Man and the Lighthouse"	November 16, 1985
Wedding Bells: Professor Coldheart develops a plan to wreck Care-a-Lot, by marrying Auntie Freeze in Care-A-Lot and having a special organ played at the ceremony that will send out destructive sound waves. The Old Man and the Lighthouse: Amy and two boys think that Captain McDougal who owns the lighthouse is odd compared to them, but the Care Bears and Care Bear Cousins convince them that he is nice.
11	11	"The Cloud Worm / The Girl Who Called Wolf"	November 23, 1985
The Cloud Worm: Love-a-lot Bear plans with the other Care Bears to "search Care-a-lot" when they all hear a mysterious noise. In their search, she discovers a giant worm that eats clouds, and tries to beg him not to damage Care-A-Lot. After her first attempt, she brings the other Care Bears with her as her allies and together, they try to beg the Cloud Worm to stop eating the clouds. When he refuses, Care-a-lot is ambushed and the Care Bears who drive their cloud mobiles save the victims of the ambush. Altogether, they use a Care Bear Stare to form a rainbow that can punish the Cloud Worm until he confesses. As he complains that he is hungry, they bring him back into his own area where he can eat his own clouds in case the day gets cloudy. The Girl Who Called Wolf: Jill Wayland has been sent to her bedroom for making a prank call to the fire department, claiming there is a cat stuck in a tree. She sneaks out and meets up with her friends, making up a story that she found a hidden treasure in the old Palmer Mansion. Her friends believe her, and go to find the treasure. Along with the Care Bears and Cousins, she must save her friends from the old, spooky house.

== Nelvana series (1986–88) ==
The Care Bears Family, co-produced by Toronto's Nelvana studio, premiered on September 13, 1986 on ABC in the U.S and on September 12, 1988 on Global Television Network. It's a soft reboot of the franchise with Care Bear Cousins are retconned to be grow together with Care Bears.

=== Season 1 (1986) ===
Takes place after Care Bears Movie II: A New Generation.

No. overall	No. in season	Title	Written by	Original release date
1	1	"Care-a-lot's Birthday"	Peter Sauder	September 13, 1986
Care-a-Lot's birthday celebrations are interrupted when No Heart's apprentice, Beastly, kidnaps Baby Hugs and Baby Tugs, while both Cubs practice acrobatic stunts for the festivities.
2	2	"Grumpy's Three Wishes"	Peter Sauder	September 20, 1986
Grumpy helps a boy named Alvin gain confidence and must build up his own as he accepts the challenge to fight No Heart and save Care-A-Lot.
3	3	"The Great Race"	J.D. Smith	September 27, 1986
Beastly tricks his way in the annual Care Bear Obstacle Race in hopes of being crowned King of Care-A-Lot for one day.
4	4	"Home Sweet Homeless"	Steve Wright and Mike Silvani	October 4, 1986
Proud Heart gets a present unknowingly from No Heart which floods the Care Bear Cousins out of their home.
5	5	"Lost at Sea / The Sleeping Giant"	b.p. Nichol; Peter Sauder	October 11, 1986
Lost at Sea: When Hugs and Tugs accidentally set the Cloud Clipper adrift, Beastly tries to make sure the cubs get lost forever. The Sleeping Giant: Hugs and Tugs are out playing when they stumble upon a giant who befriends them. Note: The latter episode is a metaphor for death.
6	6	"The Big Star Round-up"	J.D. Smith	October 18, 1986
No Heart unleashes a terrible demon to put Beastly out of a job and try to destroy the Care Bears, the Care Bear Cousins and a clumsy girl named Gay as they drive a herd of helpless little stars to Big Star Point.
7	7	"The Camp Out / I, Robot Heart"	John De Klein; J.D. Smith	October 25, 1986
The Camp-Out: Brave Heart, Lotsa Heart, Grumpy, Hugs & Tugs, Playful Heart And Funshine go camping and find themselves in big trouble when they run into a Swamp Monster, which they have to outwit before their trip is ruined. I, Robot Heart: Bright Heart and Grumpy try to help a "heartless" robot, not realizing that Beastly is trying to capture him as a gift for No Heart.
8	8	"The Bravest of the Brave"	Peter Sauder	November 1, 1986
Tender Heart, Cheer, Grumpy, and Swift Heart try to stop Dr. Fright from taking over a carnival as Brave Heart and a boy named Adam try to overcome their fear of the dark.
9	9	"The Long Lost Care Bears"	J.D. Smith	November 8, 1986
One day, Tender Heart Bear, Good Luck Bear, Lotsa Heart Elephant, Grumpy Bear, and Swift Heart Rabbit are cleaning out the attic when they come across an old photo album, where they see two pandas. As they ponder who these pandas might be, the Caring Meter notifies them. They initially wind up in a "winter wasteland", but wind up in a beautiful valley with two pandas, "Perfect" and "Polite," who always speak in rhyme.
10	10	"Birthday Bear's Blues"	J.D. Smith	November 15, 1986
Birthday Bear thinks the others have forgotten his birthday, and is sent to help a rich boy named Charles celebrate his birthday. They try inviting Charles' schoolmates, which doesn't work as planned. The duo celebrates the birthday together, but it's not quite as fun. The rest of the family comes down to Earth, and they celebrate together, eventually winding up in a maze of thorns. Charles and Birthday Bear must save them; No Heart might have "divided and conquered" them for good.
11	11	"Grams Bear's Thanksgiving Surprise"	John De Klein	November 22, 1986
The evil Sour Sam is out to ruin Thanksgiving with his Crabby Apple Pies and only the Care Bears can stop him.
12	12	"Order on the Court / The All-Powerful Mr. Beastly"	Heather McGillvray; John de Klein	November 29, 1986
Order on the Court: The Care Bear Cousins finally have a chance to win the annual basketball game--but try to make sure Lotsa Heart doesn't blow it. The All-Powerful Mr. Beastly: Beastly uses No Heart's broken amulet to try to capture Tenderheart and Brave Heart while they are on a caring call.
13	13	"The Cloud of Uncaring"	Peter Sauder	December 6, 1986
A boy named Dale is upset because his mother, a nurse, is unable to take him swimming, even though she promised she would take him. Secret Bear, Grumpy Bear, Cozy Heart Penguin and Wish Bear come down to help him, and succeed. But thanks to No Heart, their troubles are only just beginning.

=== Season 2 (1987) ===
Takes place after The Care Bears Adventure in Wonderland.

No. overall	No. in season	Title	Written by	Original release date
14	1	"The Wrath of Shreeky"	Peter Sauder	September 26, 1987
No Heart receives a visit from his niece Shreeky, who is as evil as he is.
15	2	"Bright Heart's Bad Day / The Magic Lamp"	John de Klein	October 3, 1987
Bright Heart's Bad Day: The Care Bear Family's Annual Picnic turns into a disaster for Bright Heart when he tries to become someone he's not. The Magic Lamp: Grams tells the exciting Arabian adventure of how Champ must find a magic lamp in the city of Baghdad.
16	3	"Desert Gold / The Gift of Caring"	Steven Rauchman; John De Klein	October 10, 1987
Desert Gold: Grams tells a story where the bears look for a map that will lead them to a valley of gold. The Gift of Caring: A girl in an electronic wheelchair named Carol is so tired of making the Care Baskets for her friends in the hospital, but Cheer Bear approaches the earth in time to help her finish the task.
17	4	"The Two Princesses / The Cloud Monster"	Steve Wright	October 17, 1987
The Two Princesses: Grams tells a story where Treat Heart and Cheer learn to appreciate each other and work together when they are confronted by an evil Two-Headed Monster. The Cloud Monster: When Beastly ruins No-Heart's experiment to create a creature that would stop the Care Bears, Beastly creates a cloud monster. Shreeky uses the monster to eat the clouds of Care-A-Lot.
18	5	"Grumpy the Clumsy / The Purple Chariot"	John De Klein	October 24, 1987
Grumpy the Clumsy: Viking Grumpy persists in overcoming his clumsiness when he tries to become someone he's not. The Purple Chariot: Grams tells the story of ancient Rome where Champ tries to turn Brave Heart back into the champion chariot racer he once was.
19	6	"The Caring Crystals / The Best Way to Make Friends"	John De Klein	October 31, 1987
Caring Crystals: Grumpy is the only one who can save the day when No Heart unleashes his evil bubbles of uncaring on a village. The Best Way to Make Friends: Treat Heart sets out to make a video about how to make friends, but ends up losing her friends by constantly laughing at them. Meanwhile, Shreeky orders Beastly to catch the Care Bears so that No Heart can give the Care Bears for her present before she goes away.

=== Season 3 (1988) ===
No. overall	No. in season	Title	Written by	Original release date
20	1	"Care Bear Town Parade"	Mike Silvani	September 12, 1988
Beastly tricks Cheer into buying a car that he built for the specific purpose of destroying the Parade and Care Bear Town.
21	2	"Hearts at Sea"	John De Klein	September 13, 1988
Grams tells a story of an adventurous young girl aboard a sailing ship who sets out to prove that girls can do things as well as boys can.
22	3	"No Business Like Snow Business"	Mike Silvani	September 14, 1988
Champ helps a young skier regain his confidence after an accident, but Beastly and Shreeky do their best to stop him. Meanwhile, Hugs, Tugs and Grumpy go skiing.
23	4	"The Factory of Uncaring"	Thomas J. King	September 15, 1988
Champ shirks his duty of guarding the Caring Meter giving No Heart a perfect opportunity to cover a town with uncaring smoke.
24	5	"The Lost Gift / Lotsa Heart's Wish"	John De Klein; Mike Silvani	September 16, 1988
The Lost Gift: Grams tells Hugs and Tugs how a magical apple tree fed an entire village until greed destroyed it. Lotsa Heart's Wish: When Lotsa Heart helps a unicorn, he is granted three wishes with unexpected results.
25	6	"The Showdown"	Alan Swayze	September 19, 1988
The Care Bears try to help a young rodeo boy learn that how you feel about yourself is what really counts.
26	7	"Caring for Spring"	Thomas J. King	September 20, 1988
"Caring For Spring": Grams tells a story where Mother Nature (Grams) is captured by the Wicked Witch of Winter (Shreeky), and if Jack and Jill (Hugs and Tugs) don't rescue her by sunset, it will be winter forever.
27	8	"The Turnabout / Cheer of the Jungle"	John De Klein; Mike Silvani	September 21, 1988
The Turnabout: When No Heart creates a fog to keep the Care Bears from helping people, Brave Heart puts the Care Bear team in charge of putting the Caring Beacon in the tower and watching Hugs and Tugs. Champ tells Cheer and Treat Heart to watch the cubs, but Cheer dares him and Bright Heart to watch them instead; as a result, the girls keep watch over the beacon and the boys watch the cubs. Cheer of the Jungle: Grams tells the story where Cheer, a city girl, visits Champ in the jungle, but soon learns not to judge something by looks alone.
28	9	"Beautiful Dreamer / The Care Bears Carneys"	Carolyn Bennett and Josh Morris; Steven Rauchman	September 22, 1988
Beautiful Dreamer: Grams tells a story of a Broadway star who gives a young washer woman the confidence to go onstage and perform in a show. The Care Bear Carneys: Beastly and Shreeky trick the Care Bears away from their work and into a carnival they set up as a trap to capture them.
29	10	"The Pirate Treasure / Grin & Bear It"	Mike Silvani; J.D. Smith	September 23, 1988
The Pirate Treasure: Beastly takes Champ and Treat Heart prisoner on the high seas and Hugs and Tugs try to save them with the help of a pirate. Grin and Bear It: When No Heart banishes Beastly for ruining one of his spells, he tries to join the Care Bears, but discovers being a good guy is more than he can stand.
30	11	"Perils of the Pyramid / Bedtime for Care-a-lot"	Mike Silvani; Alan Templeton and Mary Crawford	October 25, 1988
Perils of the Pyramid: Grams tells a story where Hugs and Tugs teach gung-ho archeologist Brave Heart to look before you leap as they enter a booby-trapped pyramid. Bedtime for Care-a-Lot: Bedtime Bear is the only one who can save the other Care Bears who have been put to sleep by No Heart's magical sleeping sand.
31	12	"The Fountain of Youth / Treat Heart Baba and the Two Thieves"	Mike Silvani; Thomas J. King	September 27, 1988
Fountain of Youth: Grams tells a story where Champ Bear, with help from Braveheart Lion, goes on a quest to find a fountain whose water makes everyone younger--but Shreeky and Beastly will stop at nothing to find it, too. Treat Heart Baba and the Two Thieves: Grams tells a story where Treat Heart Pig plays the role of Ali Baba in this episode with Beastly and Shreeky playing the roles of the thieving villains. Treat Heart must outwit the two villains in order to rescue the other Care Bears' missing stuff.
32	13	"Dr. Brightenstein's Monster / The Care Fair Scare"	Carolyn Bennett and Josh Morris; Anne Langdon	September 28, 1988
Brightenstein's Monster: In this story told by Grams, Bright Heart plays the role of Dr. Frankenstein in this episode, with Grumpy Bear playing his assistant. The duo don't have any friends in the village of Carenberg (they scare people due to the fact that they live by themselves in a creepy castle), until they "make" a friend, with a candy heart made out of sugar. He meets Hugs and Tugs and plays "tag" with them, which the villagers presume to be the monster attacking. The Care Fair Scare: The Care Bears organize a fair to cheer children up and make them happy, but Shreeky and Beastly are determined to destroy it.
33	14	"Mystery of the Phantom / Under the Bigtop"	Thomas J. King; Steven Rauchman	September 29, 1988
Mystery of the Phantom: Grams recounts how a group of Care Bears overcome their fears to fix up an old theatre haunted by a mysterious phantom. Under the Bigtop: Brave Heart and Grumpy help a small boy be part of the circus, unaware that the evil duo Beastly and Shreeky are out to trap them.
34	15	"The Most Ancient Gift / Ski Trouble"	Steven Rauchman; Mike Silvani	September 30, 1988
The Most Ancient Gift: Grams tells a story of ancient Egypt, Beastly and Shreeky try to break the friendship between two neighboring countries by stealing a precious gift. Ski Trouble: Bright Heart goes skiing by himself, and is nearly captured by Beastly and Shreeky.
35	16	"The Care Bears' Exercise Show / The Care-a-lot Games"	Laura Shepherd; John Flagg	October 3, 1988
The Care Bear Exercise Show: A parody of the many exercise shows and video tapes that were popular in the 1980's. Champ Bear hosts an exercise show complete with warm up aerobics, and many helpful fitness tips. The Care-a-Lot Games: Brave Heart hosts a light-hearted look at a variety of children's games, with cheating duo Beastly and Shreeky competing as well, with the latter coaching the former.
36	17	"Grams' Cooking Corner / A Care Bear's Look at Food Facts and Fables"	Arna Selznick; Arna Selznick, Alan Bunce, Laura Shepherd and John Flagg	October 4, 1988
Gram's Cooking Corner: Grams bear produces a new cooking show and bakes cookies. Even Beastly watches it and tries to make cookies as good as hers. The Care Bears' Book of Facts and Fables: The Care Bears host a fascinating potpourri of cooking trivia and yummy recipes that children can do themselves.
37	18	"The Thing That Came to Stay / Space Bubbles"	John De Klein; Alex Boon and Atul Rao	October 5, 1988
The Thing That Came to Stay: A parody of the famous Star Trek franchise. A wild animal Cheer brings on board the S.S. Friendship creates so much trouble that she soon learns animals should remain in the wild. Space Bubbles: When the Care Bears help a marooned Space Clown, Grumpy, unfortunately, gets the brunt of the Clown's practical jokes.
38	19	"Cheer Bear's Chance / A Hungry Little Guy"	Steve Wright; Dennise Fordham	October 6, 1988
Cheer's Chance: Cheer must prove herself to the rest of the crew when Beastly and Shreeky attack the S.S. Friendship. A Hungry Little Guy: Beastly and Shreeky place an alien on board the S.S. Friendship to create havoc among the crew members so they can take over.
39	20	"King of the Moon / On Duty"	Atul Rao; Marjorie K. Olmsted and Marjorie E. Olmsted	October 7, 1988
King of the Moon: Brave Heart believes he's not needed by his crew and becomes the King of the Moon but soon learns that they need him after all. On Duty: Treat Heart learns there is a time to work and a time to play because of her, Shreeky captures Hugs and Tugs.
40	21	"Secret of the Box / The Frozen Forest"	Thomas J. King; Steven Rauchman	October 10, 1988
The Secret of the Box: Trouble abounds when the crew of the S.S. Friendship become obsessed with opening a box to be delivered to an alien planet. The Frozen Forest: The crew of the SS Friendship is in big trouble when Beastly and Shreeky plan to use a freezing ray and turn them to ice.
41	22	"Grumpy's Little Friend / One Million CB"	Nancy Early; Mike Silvani	October 11, 1988
Grumpy's Little Friend: In prehistoric times, Grumpy wants to see his little dinosaur friend again, but has more to contend with when Shreeky and Beastly attack Cavetown and only he can defend it. One Million CB: To avoid doing their chores, Hugs and Tugs pretend to come down with a terrible sickness. Only one thing will "cure" the two baby Care Bears: a tear from No-Heartsaurus, and he has never cried before. With Grams and Brave Heart willing to risk life and limb for the cubs, Hugs and Tugs' guilty consciences attempt to let them reveal their secret.
42	23	"Tugs the Brave / Coconut Crazy"	Thomas J. King; Dennise Fordham	October 12, 1988
Tugs the Brave: Little Tugs tries to be like his hero Brave Heart, but realizes he would rather be himself when he confronts a dangerous dinosaur. Coconut Crazy: Brave Heart doesn't think much of Bright Heart's zany inventions but soon changes his tune when one of them saves Cavetown.
43	24	"Bad Luck Friday / Food Frolics"	Anne Langdon; Paul Jacksties	October 13, 1988
Bad Luck Friday: Brave Heart must overcome his superstitions on Friday the 13th and save the other Care Bears who are lost in the jungle. Food Frolics: The Care Bears are baffled when a usually friendly dinosaur turns mysteriously hostile and starts wrecking their garden.
44	25	"It's Raining, It's Boring / A Day Without Tugs"	Eric Chui; Alan Bunce	October 14, 1988
It's Raining, It's Boring: On a rainy day, Hugs and Tugs overcome the Beast of Boredom by finding exciting activities. A Day Without Tugs: With Tugs sick in bed, Hugs spends a fun filled day doing many activities with her newfound friend - her own shadow.
45	26	"The Fabulous Care Bear's Safety Game / A Rhyme in Time"	Alan Bunce; John Flagg	October 17, 1988
The Fabulous Care Bear’s Safety Game: The Care Bears explain what you should and shouldn't do when it comes to being safe around the house with Beastly providing the wrong answers and Hugs and Tugs providing the right answers. However, one pound on the contestant station could give Beastly not only a big upset victory, but also a new job. A Rhyme in Time: While Grams reads the Cubs safety rhymes, Hugs and Tugs daydream and act out what they have heard.
46	27	"Songfellow Strum and His Magic Train / Music Video"	Jim Craig	October 18, 1988
Songfellow Strum and His Magic Train: The Care Bears visit a singing minstrel in the enchanting town of Musicland. Music Video: Excitement runs high as the Care Bears attend a music concert with the singing minstrel.
47–49	28–30	"Care Bears Nutcracker Suite"	John De Klein, J.D. Smith and Susan Snooks	November 23, 1988 (Part 1) November 24, 1988 (Part 2) November 25, 1988 (Part 3) December 10, 1988 (full version, U.S.); December 25, 1988 (full version, Canada)
