= Honeymoon (1985 film) =

- Directed by: Patrick Jamain
- Written by: Patrick Jamain; Philippe Setbon (screenplay & story)
- Produced by: Xavier Gélin; René Malo
- Cinematography: Daniel Diot
- Edited by: Robert Rongier
- Music by: Robert Charlebois
- Distributed by: Malofilm Home Video (1986) (Canada)
- Release date: 1985
- Running time: 101 minutes (Canada); 98 minutes (U.S.)
- Countries: Canada; France
- Languages: English; French

Honeymoon (French: Lune de miel) is a 1985 Franco-Canadian thriller, directed by Patrick Jamain and starring Nathalie Baye.

== Plot ==
A Frenchwoman in Manhattan, in danger of being deported because of her relationship with a recently arrested drug offender, enters into a marriage of convenience with a stranger that is arranged through an agency. But even though the two are not supposed to even meet, her new husband starts taking his faux wedding vows entirely too seriously.

== Availability ==
The movie was released on videocassette in 1986 by Karl-Lorimar Home Video in the United States and in Canada by New World Video. The VHS cover marketed the film as a horror film. As of March 16, 2010, no plans have been made to release the film onto DVD.

== Cast ==
- Nathalie Baye as Cécile Carline
- John Shea as Zachary 'Zack' Freestamp
- Richard Berry as Michel
- Marla Lukofsky as Sally
- Michel Beaune as Maître Garnier
- Peter Donat as Novak
- Alf Humphreys as Sonny
- Cec Linder as Barnes
- Greg Ellwand as Bill
- Arthur Grosser as Forrester
- Shirley Merovitz as Mrs. Silvera
- Irene Kessler as Mrs. Goldberg
- Adriana Roach as Thelma
- Ken Roberts as Snack bar customer
- Sam Stone as Taxidriver
- Paul Bertoya as Blythe
- Steve Michaels as Jackson
- Tyrone Benskin as Weapon seller
- Morris Rosengarten as Dunning
