= Reflections (TV program) =

Canadian classical music television program

- Genre: Classical music
- Presented by: Syd Davidson (1960); Pat Napier (1961–1962)
- Country of origin: Canada
- Original language: English
- No. of seasons: 3

Production
- Producers: Robert Alban (1960–1961); Peter Donkin (1962)
- Production locations: Halifax, Nova Scotia, Canada
- Running time: 30 minutes

Original release
- Network: CBC Television
- Release: 2 April 1960 – 30 September 1962

Reflections is a Canadian classical music television program that aired on CBC Television in 1962.

== Premise ==
This Halifax-produced program featured song standards and informally presented classical music. During the program's run, arrangements were provided by musicians such as Lucio Agostini, and Ed McCurdy was among the various guests. The program's orchestra was led by conductor and arranger Gordon MacPherson from the Maritime Conservatory of Music.

Reflections was adapted from Souvenirs, a local 15-minute program produced at CBC Halifax Studios in Halifax, Nova Scotia.

== Scheduling ==
This half-hour program was broadcast as follows (times in Eastern):

Day	Time	Season run	
Saturdays	6:00 p.m.	2 April 1960	24 September 1960
Mondays	3:00 p.m.	17 October 1960	26 June 1961
Sundays	5:30 p.m.	7 January 1962	30 September 1962
