= Jennifer Luce =

American architect

Jennifer Luce (born May 3, 1960, in Montreal, Quebec) is the principal and founder of Luce et Studio Architects in San Diego, California. Luce grew up in Canada and received her bachelor's degree in architecture at Carleton University (1984) before moving to the United States in 1985. At Harvard University Graduate School of Design, she received her Master of Design Studies degree (1994). She is an IAA (International Academy of Architects) Professor, and has the academic position of Lecturer at Stanford University, teaching architecture at the School of Engineering. Luce was elected to the AIA College of Fellows in 2016.

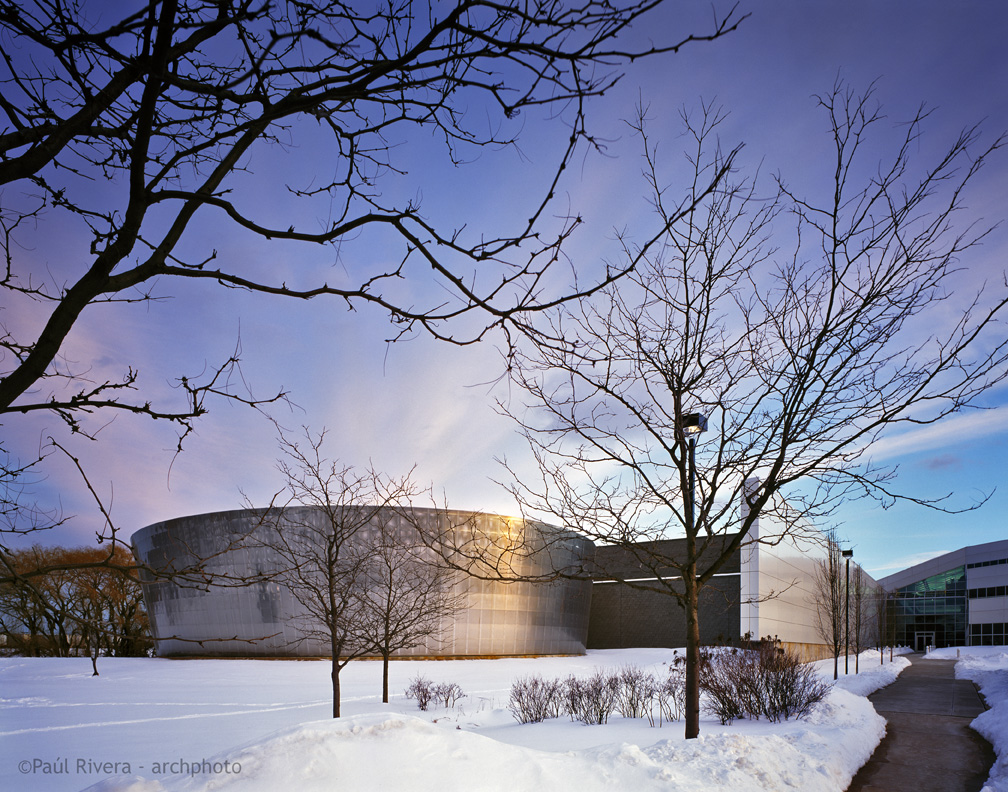
Nissan Design America, Farmington Hills

== Firm ==
While Luce is known for her spare and minimalist work, her studio, Luce et Studio Architects, which she established in 1990, is named "Luce et" for its collaborative studio–client design process. Luce et Studio's body of work includes commissions such as the redesign of the Mingei International Museum in San Diego's Balboa Park, Nissan's new Farmington Hills and LaJolla design studio, as well as corporate and residential commissions, site-specific art, public art, landscape installations, and furniture design.

Luce's work was also included in MIX an architecture and design show in 2009 at the San Diego Museum of Contemporary Art.
