= My Pet Monster =

Toyline and animated television series

My Pet Monster is a character that began as a plush doll first produced by American Greetings in 1986. It has horns, blue fur, a fanged smile, and wears breakaway orange plastic handcuffs.

The property was sold to Saban Brands in 2012. In 2018, Hasbro acquired the My Pet Monster brand and other properties from Saban Brands.

== Merchandise ==
The My Pet Monster character began as a plush doll first produced by AM Toys, a subsidiary of American Greetings, in 1986. As one of the few plush dolls marketed to boys at the time, My Pet Monster was popular in the late 1980s and early 1990s. The doll has blue fur, horns and a fanged smile, and is recognizable by its orange plastic handcuffs, which could be worn by children and came with a breakaway link so that the child could simulate breaking the chain. Several versions of the doll have been released in various sizes and other attributes. Other characters were also created with brightly colored fur and unorthodox names like Gwonk, Wogster and Rark. Their popularity allowed a wealth of merchandise including coloring books, Golden Look-Look books, frame-tray puzzles and various other items.

Toymax released a 22-inch tall talking My Pet Monster doll in 2001.

In 2020, Funko and Super7 released figures based on the original plush, both under license from Hasbro.

Another My Pet Monster toyline was launched in the fall of 2025 by The Loyal Subjects and Hasbro.

== Media ==
My Pet Monster
- Developed by: Peter Sauder
- Directed by: Laura Shepherd
- Starring: Sunny Besen Thrasher; Stuart Stone; Jeff McGibbon; Alyson Court; Dan Hennessey
- Country of origin: Canada
- No. of episodes: 13

Production
- Running time: 22 minutes per episode
- Production companies: Nelvana (Note: Characters and designs copyright of Those Characters From Cleveland.); Telefilm Canada

Original release
- Network: ABC (United States)
- Release: September 12 – December 19, 1987

The character's popularity spawned a live-action direct-to-video film in 1986 about a boy named Max who becomes the Pet Monster after being exposed to a statue, changing when hungry. Dr. Snyder, the scientist who originally discovered the statues and the legend behind them, wants to kidnap him for publicity purposes, while Max's sister helps him out of the crisis. A pilot for an unproduced series, it ends on a cliffhanger as Snyder is exposed to a statue of a much larger and more menacing monster and begins to transform.

My Pet Monster also spawned a children's animated series that ran for one season on ABC, co-produced by Nelvana Limited and Hi-Tops Video in association with Golden Books. It gives a completely different origin for the creature than the live-action film. The show follows Monster, who lives with a boy named Max. When Monster wears his handcuffs, they turn him into a stuffed animal. Max often puts the handcuffs on Monster to keep his existence secret from others. Max's sister, Jill, and his friend Chuckie, are the only ones that know this secret.

The two main adversaries in the show are Mr. Hinkle, a neighbor who always thinks Max is up to something, but is not quite sure what; and Beastur, a large monster who hates light and tries to bring Monster back to MonsterLand. Beastur, though immense and fierce, is incompetent. He can be stopped by the magic cuffs – which reduce him to a smaller, though still "alive" monster – or by his own bungling, and sent back through the warp portal to his own world. He wears dark glasses to protect his sensitive eyes, which he can use to see in the dark.

Beastur appears in nearly every episode as either a primary or secondary foe. On one occasion, he is scared back through the portal to Monsterland not by light or the cuffs, but by the affections of a smitten female gorilla. In the final episode, it is also shown that Beastur hates to be hugged, even more so than being exposed to light.

Though not a breakthrough success, the cartoon show significantly boosted sales of the already popular plush toy. Much of the voice cast of My Pet Monster reunited in 1989 for Beetlejuice, another cartoon show with a surreal theme and a supernatural world populated by fantastic monsters.

Reruns of all 13 half-hour episodes aired on Teletoon Retro in Canada from September 5, 2011.

=== Characters ===
- "Monster" (voiced by Jeff McGibbon in TV series, portrayed by Mark Parr in special) is a Monster and Max's friend in series, as opposed to being Max in special.
- Max Smith (portrayed by Sunny Besen Thrasher) is a boy who appears as a monster in the special and as a separate character in the series. When he wins the surfing competition he is referred to as Max Smith.
- Chuckie (voiced by Stuart Stone) is Max's best friend, despite being absent in the special.
- Jill Smith (voiced by Alyson Court) is Max's older sister who Monster clearly has a crush on. She appears in the series.
  - Melanie (portrayed by Alyson Court) is Max's sister in special.
- Beastur (voiced by Dan Hennessey, briefly voiced by Jack Darley in commercial) is a giant monster in the series who pursues Monster with the intention of taking him back to Monsterland. He is briefly mentioned at the end of the special as the name of one of the monsters represented by the statues.
- Mr. Hinkle (voiced by Colin Fox) is a suspicious neighbor, aware of Monster's antics though never actually succeeds in proving that Monster exists.
- Princess (voiced by Tracey Moore) is Hinkle's pet poodle.
- Dr. Snyder (portrayed by Colin Fox) is a mad scientist-turned-monster hunter who appeared in the special.
- Rod (portrayed by Yannick Bisson) is Max's older brother who appeared in the special, aware of Max's monster changing ability.
- Stephanie (portrayed by Kelly Rowan) is Rod's date who appeared in the special.
- Jenny is Hinkle's niece.
- Wolfmen (musicians)
- Leo (school bully)
- Myron Peabody (student)
- Annie (voiced by Tara Strong) (credited as Tara Charendoff) is a neighbour that Jill befriends.
- Jumbo Jim (ringer)
- Mrs. Smith (portrayed by Jayne Eastwood) is Max and Jill's mother who has a brief role at the beginning of the special. Her first name is Julie.
- Rex Stalker (monster hunter)
- Blaine (portrayed by Hadley Kay) is Max's nemesis in Boogie Board Blues.

=== Episodes ===
==== Direct-to-video special (1986) ====
Title	Running time	Directed by	Written by	Original release date
"My Pet Monster"	60 minutes	Timothy Bond	J.D. Smith	1986
A boy named Max (Sunny Besen Thrasher) and his sister Melanie (Alyson Court) go to a museum and see a monster-like statue that Dr. Snyder (Colin Fox) had brought back from the Middle East. After being exposed to the statue and sunlight simultaneously, Max finds himself turning into a furry blue monster whenever he gets hungry. Dr. Snyder tries to hold him captive, but Max escapes and eludes him.

==== Series (1987) ====
No.	Title	Written by	Original release date	Prod. code
1	"Goodbye Cuffs, Goodbye Monster"	Peter Sauder; J.D. Smith	September 12, 1987	001
When the dreaded Beastur gets hold of Monster's Magic Cuffs, Monster, Max and Chuckie swing into action to retrieve the cuffs before Monster is exposed and Max loses his best buddy forever.
2	"The Wolfmen Are Coming!"	Mike Silvani	September 19, 1987	002
When the hard rock group The Wolfmen hold a concert in town, Jill's costumes for her fan club members make Mr. Hinkle accidentally believe there are real wolfmen lurking in the neighborhood. Meanwhile, Max's attempts to find tickets for the concert lead to Monster becoming the guest singer.
3	"Boogie Board Blues"	J.D. Smith	September 26, 1987	003
Max is psyched about the Junior Boogie Board Competition, but a snooty competitor and a bad wipeout may make him lose all hope unless his friends can help.
4	"Rock-a-Bye Babysitters" / "Monster Cookie Mix-Up!"	J.D. Smith	October 2, 1987	004
Monster discovers the cookies that Jill has baked for a charity drive and proceeds to devour them. The gang attempts to make a new batch, which may be more disastrous than it looks.
5	"The Masked Muncher!"	J.D. Smith	October 17, 1987	005
Leo, the school bully, puts Monster's fate at stake in the upcoming pie-eating contest, so the gang enters Monster, as "The Masked Muncher", in the competition against Leo's ringer, Jumbo Jim, the "supermarket terminator".
6	"Runaway Monster"	Mike Silvani	October 24, 1987	006
It is Monster's birthday and apparently his close friends have not remembered his special day. Feeling lonely and forgotten, Monster decides to run away, not knowing they have been planning a surprise party.
7	"Finders Keepers" / "My Poet Monster"	Steve Wright Mike Silvani	October 31, 1987	007
Monster stumbles onto a stash of stolen jewels and decides to keep them for himself. Soon after he takes them, the thieves, police, Max and Chuckie all set off in search of him.
8	"Escape from Monsterland!"	J.D. Smith	November 7, 1987	008
Max, Monster and the rest of the gang are trapped in Monsterland and must find a way to escape the dangerous and frightening place.
9	"Little Bigfoot"	Alan Swayze	November 14, 1987	009
Max, Monster and the gang join Mr. Hinkle on a camping trip, pursuing the legend and mystery of Bigfoot.
10	"Monster Makes the Grade!"	Peter Sauder	November 21, 1987	010
School elections are coming up, and Monster is intrigued by this process. Monster decides to pose undercover as an exchange student in order to liven up the political process.
11	"Monster Movie Mayhem!" / "Superhero for Hire!"	Steven Rauchman Steve Wright	December 5, 1987	011
A videotape of Monster is accidentally switched with that of a show dog, and Max and the gang journey in search of it before it is viewed and Monster's secret existence is revealed. Monster dresses up as the superhero Garbageman and he and his friends fight criminals.
12	"Gorill'a My Dreams"	J.D. Smith	December 12, 1987	012
While enjoying a trip to the zoo, Monster and the gang encounter a lonely gorilla. Beastur shows up.
13	"The Monster Hunter"	John de Klein	December 19, 1987	013
A monster hunter called Rex Stalker appears in search of Monster. Beastur makes one last attempt to drag him back into Monsterland, but chaos soon ensues.

== Videogame ==
In 2012, Saban Brands and The Playforge launched a mobile game based on the property, called "My Pet Monsters". It was a pet nurturing game with 3D graphics, available for iOS devices.

== Home media ==
- KaBoom! Entertainment released My Pet Monster - The Complete Series in October 2008, featuring all 13 episodes, on DVD exclusively in Canada.
- Trinity Home Entertainment released My Pet Monster - The Complete Series on DVD in the USA in October 2009.
- The live-action film has only been released on VHS.
