= The Nation's Business =

- Genre: Political
- Country of origin: Canada
- Original language: English

Production
- Production location: Ottawa
- Running time: 5–15 minutes

Original release
- Network: CBC Television
- Release: 16 April 1956

The Nation's Business is a Canadian free-time political television program that premiered on CBC Television in 1956. The show was established with the consultation of the Canadian political parties. It initially was 10 minutes long, but was increased to 15 minutes by the end of the year.

== Premise ==
The program began in early 1956 as a ten-minute time slot in which federal political parties could address television viewers. Initially, it aired on opposite weeks to The Rhythm Pals. The schedule was established in consultation with the elected political parties, based on the practice of a similar existing free-time CBC Radio program, which began airing in 1946.

In late 1956, episodes were increased to a 15-minute length and alternated with a regional free time political broadcast (Provincial Affairs) which provided similar access programming for the provincial parties. During its initial years, French broadcasts (Les affaires de l'etat) were presented in rotation with English while the expansion of separate English and French CBC networks continued. Eventually the program was reduced to a 5-7-minute time slot.

== Producers ==
- Michael Hind-Smith (1956–60)
- Lewis Miller (1960–64)
- Jim Taylor (1964–66)
- Bernard Ostry (1966–68)
- Gordon Cullingham (1969–71)
- Brian O'Connor (1971–73)
- Del McKenzie (1976–77)
- Nancy McLarty (1979–80)
- Brian Frappier (1980-?)

== Scheduling ==
Early episodes in late 1956 were broadcast certain Mondays at 7:30 p.m. Through the 1950s and 1960s, the program appeared in early evening time slots, moving to late Sunday nights from October 1969.
