= Mary Grannan =

Canadian children's writer and radio personality

- Born: Mary Evelyn Grannan; 11 February 1900; Fredericton, New Brunswick, Canada
- Died: 3 January 1975 (aged 74); Fredericton
- Occupations: Teacher, radio personality, writer
- Writing career
- Language: English
- Genre: Children's literature
- Notable works: Just Mary, Maggie Muggins

Mary Evelyn Grannan (11 February 1900 – 3 January 1975) was a Canadian children's writer and radio personality. She wrote and performed in programs for children on CBC Radio and CBC Television between 1938 and 1962. Stories broadcast on her radio and television programs Just Mary and Maggie Muggins were published in a series of popular books.

== Family and education ==
Mary Grannan was born into an Irish Canadian Roman Catholic family in Fredericton, New Brunswick, Canada, on 11 February 1900. She was the second of three daughters born to William Peter Grannan and Catherine Teresa Haney. Her father, a wheelwright by trade, was also employed as a fireman. Mary Grannan attended St. Dunstan's School, a Roman Catholic elementary school, and then Fredericton High School. She attended New Brunswick's Provincial Normal School in Fredericton from September 1917 to June 1918, graduating as a teacher second class.

== Teacher and broadcaster in Fredericton ==
In 1919, Mary Grannan began teaching Grade 1 at the Devon Superior School in the town of Devon, just across the Saint John River from Fredericton. She spent the rest of her 20-year teaching career at the school, where she was noted for her talents as a storyteller and as an author and producer of plays performed by her students. She took private elocution lessons, and participated in amateur theatre productions in Fredericton. In the summer of 1927 she studied at the Vesper George School of Art in Boston, and later contributed editorial cartoons to the Daily Gleaner, a Fredericton newspaper.

In April 1936, while still teaching full-time, Mary Grannan began broadcasting on CFNB, a private radio station in Fredericton. One of her programs, a comedy series entitled Aggravating Agatha, became a popular success in the local market. CFNB attempted to interest the newly formed Canadian Broadcasting Corporation in carrying it nationally, but the Corporation did not accept the proposal. On the other hand, they expressed an interest in increasing children's radio programming, and Mary Grannan developed the idea for her Just Mary program to meet that requirement. The program, in which she read her original children's stories, appeared first on CFNB in November 1937. It was carried on the eastern radio network of the CBC during the summer and the Christmas holiday season of 1938. On the strength of Just Mary she was offered a full-time position as a junior producer at CBC Radio headquarters in Toronto. She joined the CBC in Toronto in July 1939, having taken a year's leave of absence from her teaching position, and officially resigned from teaching in 1940.

== CBC radio and television ==
When she started work at CBC radio in 1939, Mary Grannan was responsible for two weekly children's programs. Just Mary, which was heard from noon to 12:15 on Sundays, was intended for children from four to eight years old. The Children's Scrapbook, a half-hour program directed at older school-aged children, was broadcast on Saturday afternoons beginning at 12:30. It offered a variety of content, including plays, interviews, and documentary broadcasts recorded outside the studio in places such as a zoo or a newspaper's linotype printing operation. The reporter for these documentary segments was Austin Willis, who was the regular announcer on both of Mary Grannan's programs. From fall 1945 to spring of 1946, an evening edition of The Children's Scrapbook, called Evening Scrapbook, appeared on Thursday evenings.

The Children's Scrapbook ceased production in the spring of 1946. To replace it, Mary Grannan wrote and produced a new half-hour program called The Land of Supposing. The program, which presented dramatizations of original stories by Mary Grannan, as well as adaptations of fairy tales and folk tales, ran from April through June from 1946 to 1948, and again in 1950.

The Maggie Muggins radio program was first broadcast on 1 January 1948 and was heard on Wednesday afternoons. It was based on Mary Grannan's book, also entitled Maggie Muggins, which had been published in 1944. Unlike the Just Mary stories, Maggie Muggins had a continuing cast of characters. By 1949, it had a larger audience than any other Canadian children's program. The radio series ended in June 1953, when the actress who played Maggie graduated from high school. Maggie Muggins became a television program in February 1955.

In 1960, Mary Grannan retired, having reached the age of 60, the mandatory retirement age for women at the Canadian Broadcasting Corporation. She stayed in Toronto and continued to work on her two programs, Just Mary on radio and Maggie Muggins on television, as a freelancer. In April 1962, a new supervisor of children's programming was appointed and both programs were cancelled. Mary Grannan returned to Fredericton and spent the rest of her life there, dying in 1975 of heart failure. The family home, where she lived with her two sisters after retirement, was recognized as a New Brunswick Historic Site in 1999.

== Children's book author ==
Prompted by fan mail requesting that the Just Mary stories be made available in book form, the CBC collaborated with the Canadian textbook publisher W.J. Gage & Company to produce Mary Grannan's first book. Entitled Just Mary and containing twelve stories, it was published in an edition of 4500 copies in January 1941. The CBC purchased 500 copies at cost for direct sale to the public, with the rest going to bookstores. A second book, Just Mary Again, appeared in late fall 1941, also published by CBC and Gage. Both books sold out quickly and were followed a third, Just Mary Stories: Combining Just Mary and Just Mary Again, which appeared in an edition of 10,000 in 1942. As a salaried CBC employee, Mary Grannan did not receive royalties from the sale of her first three books as the CBC considered that it owned the copyright of the scripts.

G.P. Putnam's Sons published a US edition of Just Mary Stories in the fall of 1944. Also in 1944 the Canadian publisher Thomas Allen & Son Limited brought out Maggie Muggins, a collection of stories that had not appeared on the radio program. Both of these publications paid royalties. Between 1943 and 1945, the copyright status of the previously broadcast Just Mary stories was under discussion by lawyers for the CBC, Thomas Allen, and Mary Grannan herself. The outcome was that Mary Grannan retained copyright in her work and received royalties from her subsequent books, which were all published by Thomas Allen in Canada. These included more than 15 titles in the Maggie Muggins series and several collections of Just Mary stories.

Mary Grannan's books were Canadian best-sellers during the 1940s and 1950s. The Just Mary titles alone had sold 120,000 copies by 1947, and by 1962 her total sales were approximately 400,000.

Grannan was named a National Historic Person in 2018.
