= 1987–88 United States network television schedule (late night) =

These are the late night schedules for the four United States broadcast networks that offer programming during this time period, from September 1987 to August 1988. All times are Eastern or Pacific. Affiliates will fill non-network schedule with local, syndicated, or paid programming. Affiliates also have the option to preempt or delay network programming at their discretion.

== Legend ==
- Light blue indicates Local programming.
- Gray indicates encore programming.
- Yellow indicates late night talk or variety shows.
- Gold indicates network news programming.

== Schedule ==
=== Monday-Friday ===
Network		11:00 pm	11:30 pm	12:00 am	12:30 am	1:00 am	1:30 am	2:00 am	2:30 am	3:00 am	3:30 am	4:00 am	4:30 am	5:00 am	5:30 am
ABC		Local Programming	Nightline	Local Programming or sign-off											
CBS		Local Programming	CBS Late Night (Mon.-Thru.)/Top of the Pops (Fri., 11:30-12:40)				Local Programming	CBS News Nightwatch							
NBC		Local Programming	The Tonight Show Starring Johnny Carson		Late Night with David Letterman		Friday Night Videos (Fri)		Local Programming or sign-off						
FOX	Fall	The Late Show		Local Programming or sign-off											
FOX	Winter	The Wilton North Report		Local Programming or sign-off											
FOX	Mid-Winter	The Late Show		Local Programming or sign-off											

=== Saturday ===
Network	11:00 pm	11:30 pm	12:00 am	12:30 am	1:00 am	1:30 am	2:00 am	2:30 am	3:00 am	3:30 am	4:00 am	4:30 am	5:00 am	5:30 am
NBC	Local Programming	Saturday Night Live			Local Programming or sign-off									

=== Sunday ===
Network	11:00 pm	11:30 pm	12:00 am	12:30 am	1:00 am	1:30 am	2:00 am	2:30 am	3:00 am	3:30 am	4:00 am	4:30 am	5:00 am	5:30 am
NBC	Local Programming	The George Michael Sports Machine	Local Programming or sign-off											

== By network ==
=== ABC ===
Returning Series

- Nightline

Not Returning From 1986-87

- The Dick Cavett Show
- Jimmy Breslin's People

=== CBS ===
Returning Series

- CBS Late Night
- CBS News Nightwatch

New Series

- Top of the Pops

Not Returning From 1986-87

- In Person from the Palace
- Keep on Cruisin'

=== Fox ===
Returning Series

- The Late Show

New Series

- The Wilton North Report

=== NBC ===
Returning Series

- Friday Night Videos
- The George Michael Sports Machine
- Late Night with David Letterman
- Saturday Night Live
- The Tonight Show Starring Johnny Carson
