= Music Break =

- Genre: Variety/Talk show
- Presented by: Georges LaFleche
- Narrated by: Warren Davis
- Country of origin: Canada
- Original language: English
- No. of seasons: 2

Production
- Running time: 30 minutes

Original release
- Network: CBC Television
- Release: 18 October 1960 – 29 June 1962

Music Break is a Canadian music variety and talk show television program that aired on CBC Television from 1960 to 1962.

== Premise ==
This Winnipeg-produced series was hosted by Georges LaFleche who received such guests as Gene Kiniski and Gordon Pinsent. Each week a female singer was included on the broadcasts. Bob McMullin conducted the series orchestra.

== Scheduling ==
This first season of this half-hour series was broadcast Tuesdays at 3:00 p.m. (Eastern) from 18 October to 27 June 1961. The second season was broadcast Wednesdays at 3:00 p.m. from 4 October 1961 to 29 June 1962.
