= Garbage Pail Kids (TV series) =

American animated television series

- Developed by: Flint Dille
- Voices of: Tara Charendoff; Cree Summer; Noam Zylberman; Michael Fantini; Alyson Court
- Country of origin: United States
- No. of seasons: 1
- No. of episodes: 13

Production
- Producer: Bob Hathcock
- Running time: 30 minutes
- Production companies: CBS Entertainment Productions; The Topps Company; Animation production: Wang Film Productions; Cuckoo's Nest Studios; Hong Ying Animation

Original release
- Release: June 7 – October 29, 1988 (UK)

Garbage Pail Kids is an American dark comedy children's animated TV series produced in 1987, based on the Garbage Pail Kids trading cards, produced and directed by Bob Hathcock and co-written and developed by Flint Dille.

Because of its controversial themes, it did not air in the United States and was replaced by another Saturday morning cartoon on CBS's 1987–88 Saturday morning lineup. It did, however, air in numerous countries around the world, including most European countries, Australia, and the Caribbean.

== Synopsis ==
The show's characters, Split Kit, Elliot Mess, Terri Cloth, Patty Putty, and Clogged Duane, are gross-looking children with abilities to help others. In the first two episodes, they have normal alter-egos, and can transform into their "Garbage Pail" identities; later episodes show them exclusively in their Garbage Pail identities.

The show also features parodies of popular films of the era such as the Indiana Jones films, Superman, Conan the Barbarian, King Kong, and The Fly. It also features segments between stories, such as "Garbage Pail Groaners" (jokes) and "Would We Lie to You?" (facts).

== Cast ==
=== Main ===
- Tara Strong – Patty Putty (episodes 1–13), Still Jill (episode 3), Carly Cuts (episode 5) (credited as Tara Charendoff)
- Cree Summer – Clogged Duane (episodes 1–13), Trashed Tracy (episode 1), Squishy (episode 2), Plain Jane (episode 3), Heartless Hal (episode 10) (credited as Cree Summer Francks)
- Noam Zylberman – Split Kit (episodes 1–13), Idaho Spud (episode 3), The Sturgeon General (episode 3)
- Michael Fantini – Elliot Mess (episodes 1–13), Clint Hardwood (episode 2), Colonel Corn (episode 3)
- Alyson Court – Terri Cloth (episodes 2–5, 7–13), Belle Button (episode 2), Lois Lamebrain (episode 7), Fay Hooray (episode 8)
- Len Carlson – Announcer (episodes 1–13), Dan Rattle (episodes 1 and 4)

== Episodes ==
Episode #	Segments
Episode 1	Open: Fun Busters Public Service Message; Junkoid Zone Aliens; Commercial: Friendly Al's Used Toy Store; "Would We Lie To You?": Toothie Ruthie/Nat Nerd; Batteries Not Included; "Garbage Pail Award": The Biggest Bully Around; Written by Flint Dille; June 7, 1988 (UK)
Episode 2	Open: Squishy; Pie Fight at the Okee Dokee Corral; Commercial: Anti-Kissing Creme; "Would We Lie To You?": Sherwood Forest/Hand Turns Green; Honest Abe Has A Close Shave; Wanted: The Cheater; Written by Rowby Goren, Gordon Kent, Flint Dille; June 9, 1988 (UK)
Episode 3	Open: Sturgeon General Warning; Idaho Spud and the Temple of Trash; Commercial: Automatic Tattler; Groaner: "Cows Can't Talk"; Justin Cleans Up; Wanted: Yvonne Yakker; Written by Rowby Goren, Buzz Dixon, Gordon Kent, Linda Woolverton; June 14, 1988 (UK)
Episode 4	Open: Cute Cartoon Characters Union's Protest; Oops! The Disaster Movie; Commercial: Clean Plate; Groaner: Eating the Whole Cake Will Make You Explode; The House That Dripped Crud; Wanted: The Borrower; Written by Flint Dille, Gordon Kent, Rowby Goren; June 16, 1988 (UK)
Episode 5	Open: Little Brother; Savage Stuart the Barbarian; Commercial: Homework Machine; Groaner: World's Most Powerful Glue; Green Dean Goes Out Of His Bean; Garbage Pail Award: Carly Cuts; Written by Rowby Goren, Michael Hill, Gordon Kent; June 21, 1988 (UK)
Episode 6	Open: Mice Like It Too; R.A.L.F.; Commercial: Bully Kicker; Groaner: 3000 year old Mummy; Elliot Messed Up; Wanted: The Party Pooper; Written by Gordon Kent, Doug Booth, Rowby Goren, Flint Dille; June 23, 1988 (UK)
Episode 7	Open: Aliens Make Contact; Supernerd; Commercial: Sister Alarm; Groaner: Fish in the Bathtub; Mona Loser; Garbage Pail Award: The Babysitter; Written by Gordon Kent, Marvin Wolfman, Donna Kuyper, Paul Davids, Rowby Goren; June 28, 1988 (UK)
Episode 8	Open: Do Not Adjust Your TV; Kinky Konk; Commercial: Volume Control for Noisy Brothers; Groaner: 3 minute Eggs; Chris Messin' August; Wanted: The Bathroom Hog; Written by Rowby Goren, Buzz Dixon, Gordon Kent, Paul Davids; June 30, 1988 (UK)
Episode 9	Open: Couch Potatoes; Goldthumb; Commercial: Fake School Bell; Groaner: Good-for-Nothing Dog; An Egg-citing Adventure; Wanted: Teacher's Pet; Written by Gordon Kent, Flint Dille, Rowby Goren; July 5, 1988 (UK)
Episode 10	Open: Simon Says; The Unmentionables; Commercial: Fake Rubber Blow-Up Kid; Groaner: Red-Handed; Heartless Hal; Garbage Pail Award: The Neighborhood Grouch; Written by Linda Woolverton, Gordon Kent, Flint Dille, Rowby Goren; July 7, 1988 (UK)
Episode 11	Open: Garbage Pail "Kiss"; The Pink Cat's Eye; Commercial: Cootie Detector; Groaner: You're Not Buying That; A Rhyme In Time; Garbage Pail Award: Mother of the Year; Written by Richard Mervin, Gordon Kent, Rowby Goren; July 12, 1988 (UK)
Episode 12	Open: The Family Dog; Shirley Dimples; Commercial: Bird Brain; Groaner: Man in the Soup; The Land of Odd; Wanted: Nosy Neighbors; Written by Gordon Kent, Paul Dini, Michael Charles Hill, Flint Dille; July 14, 1988 (UK)
Episode 13	Open: Kid's Drawing; The Fry; Commercial: Have a Nice Meal; Groaner: Mother Knows Best; A Fishy Story; Garbage Pail Award: Father of the Year; Written by Gordon Kent, Flint Dille; July 19, 1988 (UK)

== Home media ==
Paramount Home Entertainment released the series on DVD on April 4, 2006, marking the show's debut in the United States.

== Controversy ==
CBS directly produced the series and ordered an entire season, heavily promoting it in the run-up to the 1987–88 season. However, it was abruptly pulled a few days before its debut, and (just like Little Muppet Monsters) was replaced with an extra half-hour of Muppet Babies, which was expanded to 90 minutes in order to fill the timeslot after Garbage Pail Kids was pulled from the schedule.

CBS removed the series from their schedule, following protests from Action for Children's Television, the National Coalition on Television Violence, and the Christian Leaders for Responsible Television (a part of the American Family Association). The reasons given were that the series ridiculed the disabled and glorified violence, along with the claim that the program was effectively a program-length commercial for the Garbage Pail Kids trading cards.

Some advertisers, such as Nabisco, McDonald's and Crayola also pulled out, either due to pressure from interest groups, or because they were unable to pre-screen the series from advanced tapes.

A few CBS affiliates, such as WIBW-TV in Topeka, Kansas, KOTV in Tulsa, Oklahoma, WBNS-TV in Columbus, Ohio, KHOU-TV in Houston, Texas and KREM-TV in Spokane, Washington made known they would not carry the series on their stations, notifying CBS of their pre-emptions weeks in advance of the debut.

Despite not airing in the United States, the series did air internationally, including in Spain, Italy, France, Germany, and the United Kingdom, among other countries.
