= Inquiry (TV program) =

- Genre: Current affairs
- Presented by: Davidson Dunton (1960–1963); Laurier LaPierre (1963–1964)
- Country of origin: Canada
- Original language: English
- No. of seasons: 4

Production
- Producer: Patrick Watson
- Running time: 30 minutes

Original release
- Network: CBC Television
- Release: 26 December 1960 – 27 July 1964

Inquiry is a Canadian current affairs television program that aired on CBC Television from 1960 to 1964.

== Premise ==
Topics for the first two seasons included censorship, the Columbia River Treaty, the isolation of immigrants, the military, nuclear power, politics, pollution, Quebec separatism and taxation. In the third season, the program was able to expand its coverage to include international topics, thanks to a 25% increase in the program's budget from the CBC. Warner Troyer also emerged as a leading journalistic talent first in writing, then in production of stories, then joining Dunton in interviews.

Davidson Dunton, previously chairman of the CBC, was the first host of this Ottawa-produced program. When Dunton was appointed to the Royal Commission on Bilingualism and Biculturalism in 1963, he was replaced by Laurier LaPierre. Producer Patrick Watson had earlier made an unsuccessful offer to Pierre Trudeau to host Inquiry.

The title card for the series indicated that its name be pronounced /ɪnˈkwaɪəri/ rather than /ˈɪnkwɪri/.

When Inquiry ended in 1964, many core participants in the series joined This Hour Has Seven Days, including LaPierre, Troyer and Watson.

== Scheduling ==
This half-hour program was broadcast for four seasons as follows (Eastern times):

Day	Time	Season run
Mondays	10:30 p.m.	26 December 1960 to 22 May 1961
Tuesdays	10:00 p.m.	3 October 1961 to 27 March 1962
Tuesdays	10:30 p.m.	8 May to 26 Jun 1962
Tuesdays	10:00 p.m.	2 October 1962 to 26 March 1963
Tuesdays	10:30 p.m.	2 April (to September?) 1963
Mondays	10:00 p.m.	30 September 1963 to 27 July 1964
