= Linda Denham =

American businesswoman (born 1963)

Linda B. Denham
- Born: 1963 (age 62–63); Cleveland, Ohio, U.S.
- Occupations: Vice President of Marketing; Director of Marketing
- Years active: 1980s
- Employer: Kenner
- Known for: Care Bears

Linda B. Denham is the co-creator of the Care Bears franchise along with Elena Kucharik, the main artist for the greeting cards in the 1980s.

Denham served as Director and Vice President of Marketing for the Kenner toy company. In 1985, she was involved in television commercials for its Baby Alive doll. She is also a member of Sigma Sigma Sigma sorority at Miami University in Oxford, Ohio.
