= Elena Kucharik =

American artist

- Born: Cleveland, Ohio, U.S.
- Occupation: Children's illustrator
- Known for: Original artwork for Care Bears

Elena Kucharik is an American children's illustrator best known for her artwork across the entire line of Care Bears items from the 1980s. She was co-creator of that franchise along with Linda Denham. Kucharik is also an illustrator of the Christian children's book series Little Blessings published by Tyndale House.

Kucharik was born in Cleveland, Ohio and received a bachelor's degree of Fine Arts from Kent State University.

As the lead Care Bears illustrator, Elena worked for American Greetings Corporation, who owns the trademark and her original art.
