= Tidewater Tramp =

Canadian children's television series

- Genre: Children's television; Adventure
- Written by: Christine Best; Doug Forrester; Thomas Gilchrist; Peter Statner
- Country of origin: Canada
- Original language: English
- No. of seasons: 2 (except 1960-1961)

Production
- Producers: Philip Keatley; John Thorne
- Running time: 30 minutes

Original release
- Network: CBC Television
- Release: 2 October 1959 – 29 June 1962

Tidewater Tramp is a Canadian children's adventure television series that aired on CBC Television from 1959 to 1961.

== Premise ==
This Vancouver-produced series features the adventures of Captain Martin (Reg McReynolds) and his tramp steamer the Flying Kestrel. He carried cargo along the Inside Passage of British Columbia with the assistance of his daughter Gail (Maureen Cook) and coast cadet Peter (Robert William Chambers).

Most scenes were recorded in studio supplemented by location shots such as scenes from a British Columbia freighter.

== Scheduling ==
This half-hour series was broadcast Fridays at 5:00 p.m. (Eastern) from 2 October 1959 until 29 June 1962, omitting the season between March 1960 and October 1961.
