= Maggie Muggins =

Canadian children's radio/television series

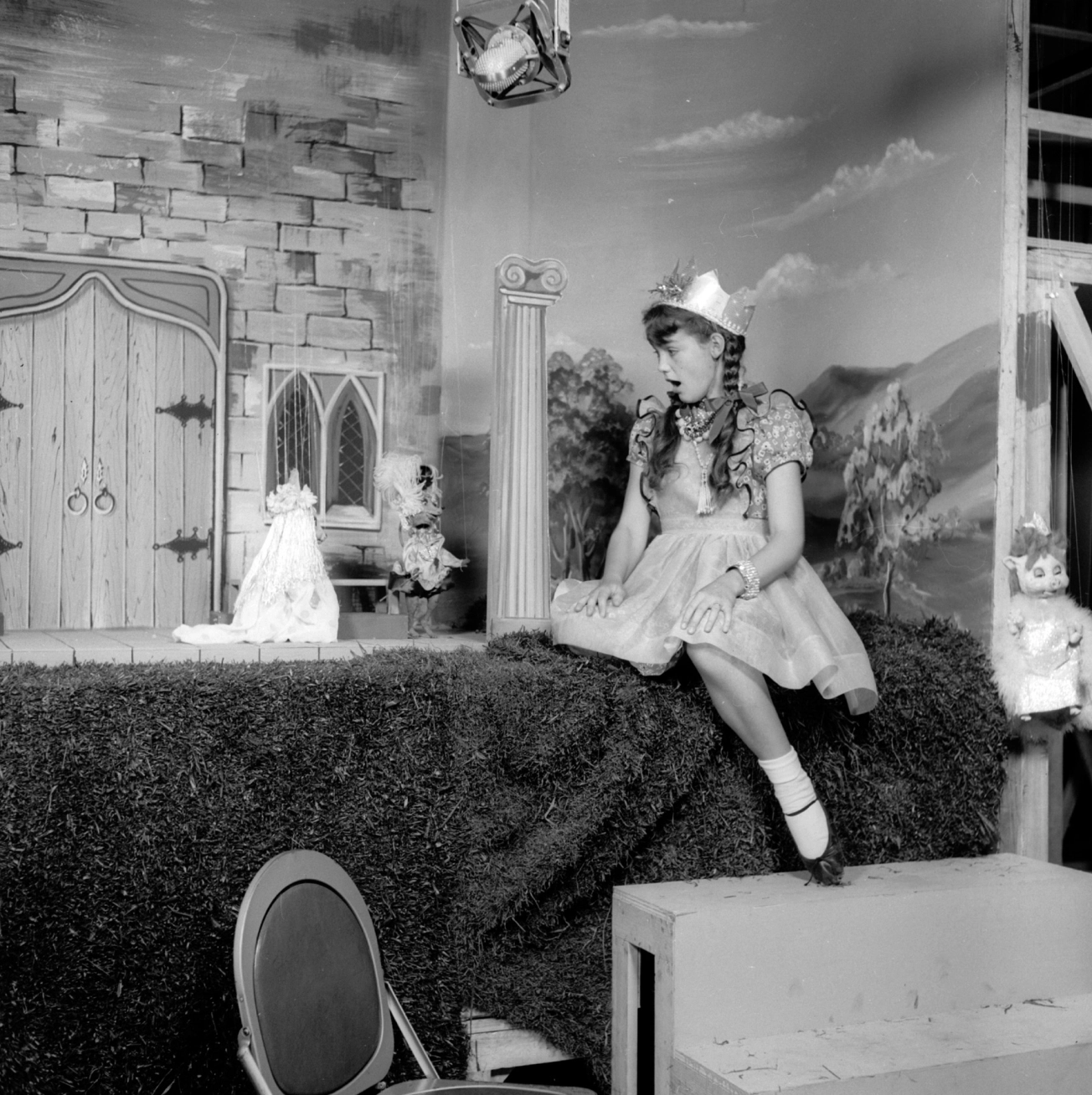
- Beth Morris as Maggie Muggins with Fitzgerald Fieldmouse
- Genre: Children's television
- Created by: Mary Grannan
- Written by: Mary Grannan
- Directed by: Michael Spivak, Norman Jewison
- Starring: Beth Morris (1955); Deanne Taylor (1956-1959); Mary Long (1959-1962); John Drainie (1955-1956); Frank Peddie (1956-1959); Doug Master (1959-1962); Mavor Moore; Robert Christie; Puppeteers John and Linda Keogh
- Voices of: Ruth Springford, Alice Hill, Murray Westgate, Jack Mather, Margot Christie
- Theme music composer: Lou Snider
- Country of origin: Canada
- Original language: English
- No. of seasons: 7

Production
- Producers: Dick Knowles; Francis Chapman
- Running time: 15 minutes

Original release
- Network: CBC Television
- Release: September 29, 1955 – June 27, 1962

Related
- Maggie Muggins (radio program)

Maggie Muggins is a Canadian children's radio and television series which began on-air live as a fifteen-minute program on CBC Radio on New Year's Day, 1947. The highly popular radio program engaged children's imaginations, with its continuing cast of unique animal puppets and human characters. Maggie Muggins moved to CBC Television to air between September 29, 1955, and June 27, 1962.

Maggie Muggins is a freckle-faced girl in a gingham dress, with her red hair pulled back in two long pigtails who had adventures with many human-like animals and her neighbour Mr. McGarrity, who constantly worked on his garden. The musical intro to her visit to Mr. McGarrity featured "Tra-la, tra-la, tra-la, tra-laritty, we're off to see Mr. McGarrity". Another key character was Fitzgerald Fieldmouse.

The original Maggie Muggins, who performed the role throughout its run on CBC Radio, was Beryl Braithwaite (later Beryl Hart), eldest daughter of the freelance writer and novelist Max Braithwaite. Beryl was ten years old when the series began. Maggie's signature sign-off was "I don't know what will happen tomorrow."

The television series was adapted from previous media including radio and print media.
