= Ewok (disambiguation) =

Ewok or Ewoks may refer to:

- Ewok
- Ewoks (soundtrack)
- Ewoks (TV series)
- Ewoks: The Battle for Endor
- Enabling Women of Kamand (EWOK)
- Ewok (spider, a genus of spiders in the family Theraphosidae

== See also ==
- "Parade of the Ewoks"
- "Ewok Celebration"
- Return of the Ewok, an unreleased 1982 mockumentary short film
- Caravan of Courage: An Ewok Adventure, a 1984 television film
- Star Wars: Return of the Jedi: Ewok Adventure, a cancelled 1983 shoot 'em up video game
- The Ewoks Join the Fight, a 1983 children's book by Bonnie Bogart and Diane de Groat
