= Joe Johnston =

American film director and visual effects artist (born 1950)

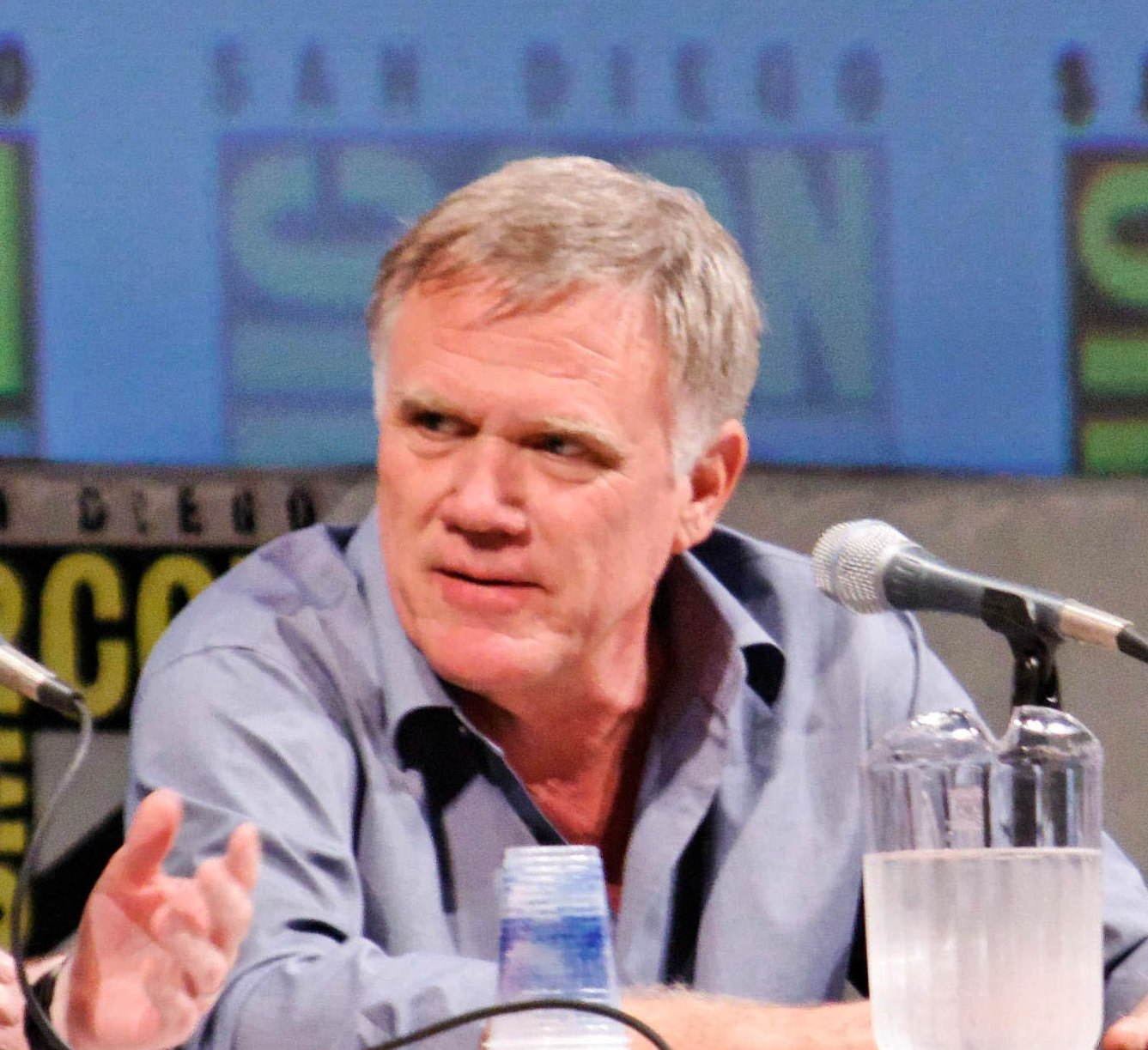
- Johnston at the 2010 San Diego Comic-Con
- Born: Joseph Eggleston Johnston II; May 13, 1950 (age 76); Austin, Texas, U.S.
- Education: ArtCenter College of Design
- Alma mater: California State University
- Occupations: Film director; film producer; effects artist; art director; writer
- Years active: 1977–present
- Notable work: Honey, I Shrunk the Kids; The Rocketeer; Jumanji; Jurassic Park III; The Wolfman; Captain America: The First Avenger

Joseph Eggleston Johnston II (born May 13, 1950) is an American filmmaker. He is best known for directing visual effects-driven films, including Honey, I Shrunk the Kids (1989), The Rocketeer (1991), Jumanji (1995), Jurassic Park III (2001), The Wolfman (2010), and Captain America: The First Avenger (2011).

== Early life ==
Johnston was born Joseph Eggleston Johnston II in Austin, Texas, and attended California State University, Long Beach, and Pasadena's Art Center College of Design, both for industrial design.

== Career ==
=== Design and visual effects ===
Much of the work at the beginning of Johnston's screen career combined design and visual effects. He began his career as a concept artist and effects technician on the first Star Wars film, directed by George Lucas. He was the creative designer of the Millennium Falcon spacecraft and co-created the design of Boba Fett in The Empire Strikes Back, while working for Industrial Light & Magic (ILM) in the 1970s and was art director on one of the visual effects teams for the sequel Return of the Jedi. His association with Lucas would later prove fruitful, when he became one of four to win an Academy Award for Best Visual Effects for Lucas and Steven Spielberg's film Raiders of the Lost Ark. Johnston continued to work on many films as an effects expert.

He was also associate producer on fantasy film Willow, and production designer on two mid-1980s TV movies which featured the Ewoks seen in Return of the Jedi.

Johnston is also author of Star Wars novel The Adventures of Teebo: A Tale of Magic and Suspense, which ties into Return of the Jedi (New York: Random House, 1984; ISBN 0-394-86568-5, ISBN 0-394-96568-X).

In 1984, at 34, Johnston went to George Lucas and stated his desire to leave Lucasfilm for a year. However, Lucas offered him to go to USC School of Cinematic Arts and study there for a year, complete with paid tuition and half-salary that would let Johnston take any class he wanted. Johnston left after a year, saying he "was asked not to return" because he "broke too many rules".

=== Directing ===
Johnston made his directorial debut in 1989 with hit comedy adventure Honey, I Shrunk the Kids, starring Rick Moranis. He followed it with comic-book adaptation The Rocketeer (1991). The film was a commercial failure, as was his next, the live-action/animated The Pagemaster, starring Macaulay Culkin. Johnston rebounded, directing the family hit Jumanji, starring Robin Williams. The film overcame lukewarm reviews to gross over $260 million.

Johnston was set to direct Hulk, but dropped out in July 1997. Johnston then switched gears from visual effects-driven action films to the more personal October Sky (1999), starring a teenage Jake Gyllenhaal as a 1950s West Virginia high school student who dreams of being a rocket scientist for NASA against his father's wishes.

Johnston's first project of the 2000s was the sequel Jurassic Park III, which made over US$300 million at the box office. Johnston followed it with western Hidalgo, starring Viggo Mortensen. Johnston then took a six-year directorial break before signing on at a month's notice to take over the 2010 remake of 1941 horror classic The Wolfman. Shot in England, the film starred Benicio del Toro and Anthony Hopkins.

In part thanks to his experience with the period superhero film The Rocketeer, Johnston was selected to direct Marvel Studios superhero adaptation Captain America: The First Avenger. Released on July 22, 2011, the film stars Chris Evans as the comic book hero and Hugo Weaving as his archenemy the Red Skull. In 2014, Johnston directed the thriller Not Safe for Work for Blumhouse Productions.

On December 12, 2017, The Hollywood Reporter reported that Johnston would direct 32 days of reshoots on the film The Nutcracker and the Four Realms, due to its director Lasse Hallström being unavailable.

On December 5, 2019, it was reported that Joe Johnston was in negotiations with Walt Disney Pictures to direct Shrunk, a legacy sequel to Honey, I Shrunk the Kids.

== Filmography ==
=== Director ===
Film

Year	Title	Notes
1989	Honey, I Shrunk the Kids	
1991	The Rocketeer	
1994	The Pagemaster	Live-action sequences
1995	Jumanji	
1999	October Sky	
2001	Jurassic Park III	
2004	Hidalgo	
2010	The Wolfman	
2011	Captain America: The First Avenger	Also executive producer
2014	Not Safe for Work	
2018	The Nutcracker and the Four Realms	Director of reshoots and oversaw post-production; Received co-director credit along with Lasse Hallström

Television

Year	Title	Director	Executive Producer	Notes
1993	The Young Indiana Jones Chronicles	Yes	No	Episode "Princeton, February 1916"
2015	Lumen	Yes	Yes	TV movie
2025	Light & Magic	Yes	Yes	Season 2

=== Other credits ===
Film

Year	Title	Director	Role
1977	Star Wars	George Lucas	Visual effects artist / Cameo as "Death Star Trooper"
1980	The Empire Strikes Back	Irvin Kershner	Visual effects artist and art director / Cameo as "Captain Shawn Valdez"
1981	Raiders of the Lost Ark	Steven Spielberg	Visual effects artist and art director
1983	Return of the Jedi	Richard Marquand	Art director
1984	Indiana Jones and the Temple of Doom	Steven Spielberg	Art director
1986	Howard the Duck	Willard Huyck	Ultralight sequence designer
1987	Batteries Not Included	Matthew Robbins	Second unit director and production manager
1988	Willow	Ron Howard	Associate producer
1989	Always	Steven Spielberg	Aerial sequence designer
1999	The Iron Giant	Brad Bird	Designer of the Iron Giant
2014	The Lawful Truth	Mollie Fitzgerald	Cameo as "Captain Waters"

Television

Year	Title	Role	Notes
1978–1979	Battlestar Galactica	Visual effects illustration and design	
1984	The Ewok Adventure	Production designer	TV movie
1985	Ewoks: The Battle for Endor	Production designer	TV movie
1985–1986	Star Wars: Droids – The Adventures of R2-D2 and C-3PO	Screenwriter (Episode "Coby and the Starhunters"), Design consultant (Special "The Great Heep")	
2017	The Creeps	Executive producer	TV short

== Bibliography ==
- 1977: The Star Wars Sketchbook
- 1980: The Empire Strikes Back Sketchbook (with Nilo Rodis-Jamero)
- 1983: Return of the Jedi Sketchbook (with Nilo Rodis-Jamero)
- 1984: The Adventures of Teebo: A Tale of Magic and Suspense
- 2005: Star Wars: Aux origines du mythe (with Doug Chiang)
- 2007: The Hill Culture
- 2011: The Mack Marsden Murder Mystery

== Awards and nominations ==
Year	Award	Category	Film	Result
1981	Academy Award	Best Visual Effects (Shared with Richard Edlund, Kit West and Bruce Nicholson)	Raiders of the Lost Ark	Won
1990	International Fantasy Film Award	Best Film	Honey, I Shrunk the Kids	Nominated
1992	Hugo Award	Best Dramatic Presentation (Shared with Danny Bilson, Paul De Meo, William Dear and Dave Stevens)	The Rocketeer	Nominated
1995	International Fantasy Film Award	Best Film (Shared with Pixote Hunt)	The Pagemaster	Nominated
1996	Saturn Award	Best Director	Jumanji	Nominated
1996	Young Artist Award	Best Family Feature – Action-Adventure	Jumanji	Won
1999	Ajijic International Film Festival Award	Best Film	October Sky	Won
2001	Saturn Award	Best Science Fiction Film	Jurassic Park III	Nominated
2001	Golden Trailer Award	Best Horror/Thriller Film	Jurassic Park III	Nominated
2004	Golden Trailer Award	Best Drama	Hidalgo	Nominated
2010	Saturn Award	Best Horror/Thriller Film	The Wolfman	Nominated
2012	Hugo Award	Best Dramatic Presentation (Shared with Christopher Markus and Stephen McFeely)	Captain America: The First Avenger	Nominated
2012	Science Fiction and Fantasy Writers of America Award	Best Film	Captain America: The First Avenger	Nominated
