= Ewoks (soundtrack) =

Ewoks – Original Soundtrack

Film score by Peter Bernstein
- Released: December 8, 1986
- Genre: Soundtrack
- Length: 35:50
- Label: Varèse Sarabande
- Producers: Peter Bernstein; Richard Kraft

Peter Bernstein chronology
Bolero (1984)	Ewoks – Original Soundtrack (1986)	Hamburger: The Motion Picture (1986)

Ewoks – Original Soundtrack is the film score to the television films Caravan of Courage: An Ewok Adventure and Ewoks: The Battle for Endor composed by Peter Bernstein. The score also includes brief reprisals of John Williams' Ewok theme from Return of the Jedi. A soundtrack album containing Bernstein's music from both films was officially released as a 12-inch LP record by Varèse Sarabande on December 8, 1986.

== Overview ==
At the request of George Lucas, Dorothée recorded a theme song entitled "Les petits Ewoks" (Little Ewoks) for the French release of Caravan of Courage.

The LP was later bootlegged onto CD in 1999 and retitled Star Wars: Ewoks. The bootleg has a number of discrepancies including an incorrect track arrangement, incorrect track names, and incorrect track times. Tracks labeled as "Additional Material" on the bootleg were never officially sanctioned by Lucasfilm and are in fact made up of music assembled from various releases of the Return of the Jedi soundtrack.

== Reception ==
The musical score has received mixed reviews. In a review specifically regarding Caravan of Courage, John J. O'Connor of The New York Times praised Bernstein's score in "transforming rather ordinary scenes into settings of foreboding". In a retrospective review of the soundtrack album, Seth Cole of Film Divider said, "There are heroic fanfares and marches reminiscent of those heard in Return of the Jedi, and definite hints of Williams-like string ostinatos as heard in the saga episodes, but the music fails to lift off in the same way."

== Track listing ==
All tracks are written by Peter Bernstein.

Side one
No.	Title	Film	Length
1.	"Trek"	Caravan of Courage	1:53
2.	"Intro/Main Title"	Caravan of Courage	2:47
3.	"Noa & Terak"	Battle for Endor	3:50
4.	"Teek"	Battle for Endor	2:44
5.	"Set Up/Terak's Theme"	Battle for Endor	3:09
6.	"Noa's Ark"	Battle for Endor	2:09
7.	"Izrina"	Caravan of Courage	1:31

Side two
No.	Title	Film	Length
1.	"Flying"	Caravan of Courage	2:46
2.	"Good Night, Bad Dreams"	Battle for Endor	3:11
3.	"Poker Game"	Battle for Endor	2:15
4.	"Pulga Chase"	Caravan of Courage	2:40
5.	"The House"	Battle for Endor	1:39
6.	"Escape"	Battle for Endor	1:30
7.	"Farewell"	Battle for Endor	3:46
Total length:			35:50

== Personnel ==
Credits adopted from liner notes:

- Peter Bernstein – composer, conductor, producer
- Richard Kraft – producer
- Tom Null – executive producer
- Christopher Palmer – orchestration
- Harry Rabinowitz – conductor (Caravan of Courage)
- Michele Stone – mastering engineer
- Jim Limbean – matrix
- Ric Hancock – matrix
- Karen Stone – production coordinator
- The Munich Philharmonic Orchestra – orchestra

== Additional music ==
Additional music featured in Caravan of Courage and The Battle for Endor:

Title	Musician(s)	Key Scenes/Notes
"Parade of the Ewoks"	John Williams	Credited as "Wicket's Theme", this composition is reprised throughout Caravan of Courage.
"My Star"	Jeff Moss	Performed by Cindal (Aubree Miller) and Charal (Siân Phillips) during separate parts of The Battle for Endor.
