= Battle for Endor =

Battle for Endor may refer to:

- Ewoks: The Battle for Endor, a 1985 movie
- Battle for Endor, a 1987 Star Wars board game
- Return of the Jedi, the film where the battle takes place
