= Star Wars: Droids =

American-Canadian animated television series

- Genre: Adventure; Science fiction; Action
- Based on: Star Wars by George Lucas
- Developed by: Peter Sauder; Ben Burtt
- Directed by: Ken Stephenson; Raymond Jafelice
- Voices of: Anthony Daniels
- Opening theme: "In Trouble Again" by Stewart Copeland
- Ending theme: "In Trouble Again" (instrumental)
- Countries of origin: United States; Canada
- No. of seasons: 1
- No. of episodes: 13 + 1 special

Production
- Executive producer: Miki Herman
- Producers: Michael Hirsh; Patrick Loubert; Clive A. Smith
- Running time: 24 minutes; 48 minutes (special)
- Production companies: Nelvana; Lucasfilm

Original release
- Network: ABC
- Release: September 7, 1985 – June 7, 1986

Related
- Ewoks

Star Wars: Droids: The Adventures of R2-D2 and C-3PO is a 1985 animated television series spin off from the original Star Wars trilogy. It focuses on the exploits of droids R2-D2 and C-3PO in the period immediately before A New Hope. The series was produced by Nelvana on behalf of Lucasfilm and broadcast on ABC from September 7, 1985, to June 7, 1986, with its sister series Ewoks (as part of The Ewoks and Droids Adventure Hour).

The series ran for one season of 13 half-hour episodes; an hour-long special broadcast in 1986 serves as the finale.

The opening theme, "In Trouble Again", was performed by Stewart Copeland of the Police. During their adventures, the droids find themselves in the service of successive new masters. The original trilogy characters Boba Fett and IG-88 appear in one episode apiece.

== Premise ==
Droids follows the adventures of R2-D2 and C-3PO as they face off against gangsters, criminals, pirates, bounty hunters, the Galactic Empire and other threats. During their adventures, the droids find themselves in the service of successive new masters and in difficult situations as a result.

The series was retroactively placed 4 years after Revenge of the Sith and 15 years before the events of A New Hope. In the latter film, C-3PO tells Luke Skywalker that his and R2-D2's "last master was Captain Antilles." The droids are placed in Antilles' care by Bail Organa at the end of Revenge of the Sith, creating an apparent continuity error. This is explained by the droids being accidentally separated from Antilles during the events of the animated series.

== Cast and characters ==
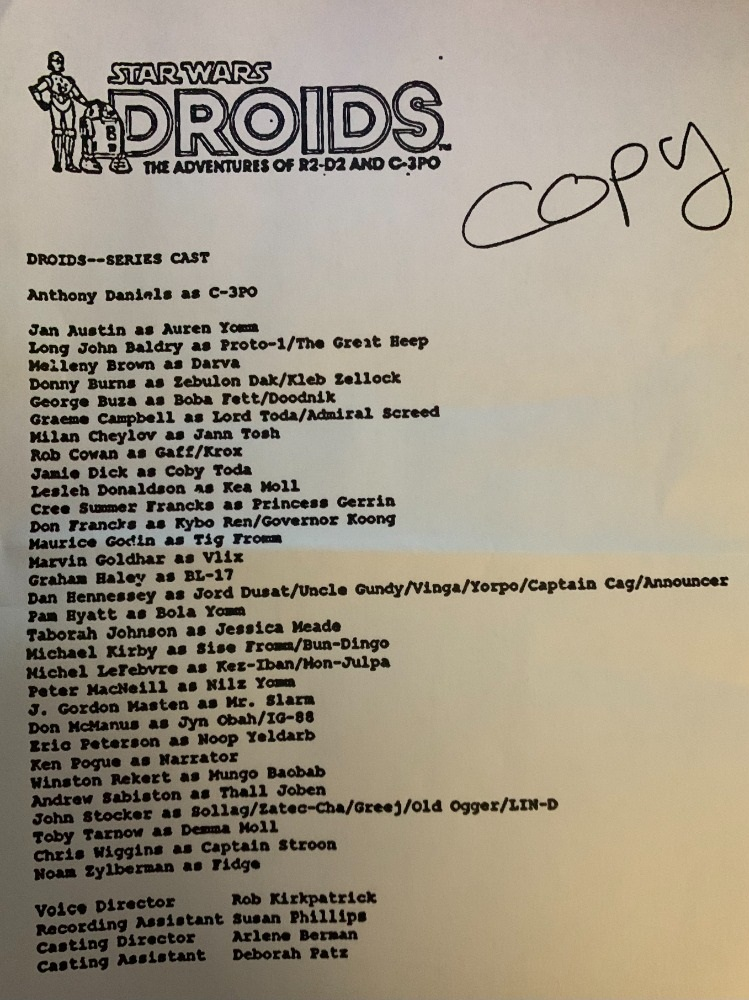
Droids Cast List photocopy

=== Series cast ===
- Anthony Daniels as C-3PO
- Jan Austin as Auren Yomm
- Long John Baldry as Proto-1 and The Great Heep
- Melleny Brown as Darva
- Donny Burns as Zebulon Dak and Kleb Zellock
- George Buza as Boba Fett and Doodnik
- Graeme Campbell as Lord Toda and Admiral Screed
- Milan Cheylov as Jann Tosh
- Rob Cowan as Gaff and Krox
- Jamie Dick as Coby Toda
- Lesleh Donaldson as Kea Moll
- Cree Summer Francks as Princess Gerrin
- Don Francks as Kybo Ren and Governor Koong
- Maurice Godin as Tig Fromm
- Marvin Goldhar as Vlix
- Graham Haley as BL-17
- Dan Hennessey as Jord Dusat, Uncle Gundy, Vinga, Yorpo, Captain Cag, and Announcer
- Pam Hyatt as Bola Yomm
- Taborah Johnson as Jessica Meade
- Michael Kirby as Sise Fromm and Bun-Dingo
- Michel LeFebvre as Kez-Iba and Mon-Julpa
- Peter MacNeill as Nilz Yomm
- J. Gordon Masten as Mr. Slarm
- Don McManus as Jyn Obah and IG-88
- Eric Peterson as Noop Yeldarb
- Ken Pogue as Narrator
- Winston Rekert as Mungo Baobab
- Andrew Sabiston as Thall Joben
- John Stocker as Sollag, Zatec-Cha, Greej. Old Ogger, and LIN-D
- Toby Tarnow as Demma Moll
- Chris Wiggins as Captain Stroon
- Noam Zylberman as Fidge

== Production and broadcast ==
The series was produced by the Canadian studio Nelvana for Lucasfilm. Several episodes were written by Star Wars sound designer Ben Burtt. Hanho Heung-Up Co. was the Korean studio hired to animate the series.

In the United Kingdom, the BBC bought the rights to broadcast the series in its entirety between 1986 and 1991 as part of its Children's BBC programming strand. The entire series was shown twice within this time (in 1986 and 1988 to coincide with the full release of the Star Wars trilogy as well as Droids on VHS). The Great Heep only made one showing in 1989 on the BBC's Saturday morning children's show Going Live! — it was split into two parts over two weeks. Different episodes from different cycles were also screened across the five-year license, with the Trigon cycle being shown in full in early 1991 on another BBC Saturday morning children's show called The 8:15 from Manchester.

The opening theme, "In Trouble Again", was performed by Stewart Copeland of the Police and written by him and Derek Holt.

The series was broadcast in the U.S. on ABC with its sister series Ewoks (as part of The Ewoks and Droids Adventure Hour). It debuted in 1985 as part of a fitness special hosted by Tony Danza and live-action versions of the droids. It ran for one season of 13 half-hour episodes; an hour-long special broadcast in 1986 serves as the finale. Droids and Ewoks were later shown in reruns on Sci-Fi Channel's Cartoon Quest in 1996, although somewhat edited for time.

In the UK, this series, along with Ewoks, was released on VHS as part of a promotion with Dairylea Cheese. Families could send in empty packages of the cheese and in return get one of six VHS tapes. These videotapes are now rare and sought after amongst collectors.

== Episodes ==
Over the course of the series, the droids team up with three different sets of masters. The series falls into three cycles or arcs; the droids usually run into their new masters at the beginning of each, and at the end are forced to leave. The Great Heep, a 48-minute television special following the series, is set before the final arc.

No.	Title	Directed by	Written by	Original release date
The Trigon One
1	"The White Witch"	Ken Stephenson & Raymond Jafelice	Peter Sauder	September 7, 1985
After being jettisoned over the deserts of Ingo by an unscrupulous former master, C-3PO and R2-D2 are taken in by speeder bike racers Jord Dusat and Thall Joben. Kea Moll sees them accidentally cross a restricted zone, and helps protect them from several deadly droids. One of gangster Tig Fromm's droids kidnaps Jord, and the droids assist Thall and Kea in rescuing Jord from Fromm's secret base, destroying much of his droid army in the process.
2	"Escape Into Terror"	Ken Stephenson & Raymond Jafelice	Peter Sauder	September 14, 1985
After C-3PO lets the hyperdrive of Kea's starship float away into space, he, R2-D2, Jord, and Thall stay with Kea and her mother, Demma, on Annoo while trying to secure a new hyperdrive. The droids discover that Kea is a member of the Rebel Alliance. While Jord stays with Demma, Thall, Kea and the droids sneak onto the Fromm gang's ship in order to infiltrate the secret base on Ingo. There, they capture the Trigon One, a weaponized satellite created by the Fromm gang to take over the galactic quadrant.
3	"The Trigon Unleashed"	Ken Stephenson & Raymond Jafelice	Peter Sauder & Richard Beban	September 21, 1985
After the Fromm gang raids the speeder shop on Ingo and captures Thall, Kea and the droids, Tig reveals that he has kidnapped Jord and Demma, refusing to release them unless Thall reveals the location of the Trigon One. Thall does so, but the group is imprisoned with Jord—until the droids outsmart the guard. When Tig pilots the space weapon back to the base of his father, Sise, he discovers that its controls have been sabotaged and programmed to crash into the base. Jord goes to commandeer an escape ship while Thall and Kea rescue Demma, and the droids do what they can to help.
4	"A Race to the Finish"	Ken Stephenson & Raymond Jafelice	Peter Sauder & Steven Wright	September 28, 1985
The team goes to Boonta to take part in a speeder race, but is pursued by the Fromm gang and forced to crash land. Sise hires Boba Fett to help exact his revenge, despite Jabba the Hutt having placed a bounty on the crimelord. Tig plants a thermal detonator on the White Witch, and Fett chases Thall into the race. In the melee, the explosive is used to destroy Fett's speeder. The despondent bounty hunter rounds up the Fromms to take to Jabba. Thall, Jord and Kea are offered careers with a speeder corporation, but refuse when they realize that R2-D2 and C-3PO would have to be reprogrammed. The droids leave their masters so they can take the job.
Mon Julpa
5	"The Lost Prince"	Ken Stephenson & Raymond Jafelice	Peter Sauder	October 5, 1985
C-3PO, R2-D2, and their new master, Jann Tosh, befriend a mysterious alien disguised as a droid. Captured by crimelord Kleb Zellock, they are forced to mine Nergon-14, a valuable unstable mineral used in proton torpedoes, which Zellock plans to sell to the Empire. In the mines they meet Sollag, who identifies their friend as Mon Julpa, Prince of the Tammuz-an. Together they defeat the crimelord and escape the mines before they are destroyed in a Nergon-14 explosion.
6	"The New King"	Ken Stephenson & Raymond Jafelice	Peter Sauder	October 12, 1985
The droids, Jann, Mon Julpa, and Sollag, along with freighter pilot Jessica Meade, travel to Tammuz-an to thwart Ko Zatec-Cha, an evil vizier with ambitions to seize the throne of the planet Tammuz-an. To achieve his sinister plans, Zatec-Cha hires bounty hunter IG-88 to capture Mon Julpa and his royal scepter, but the heroes manage to recover it, and Mon Julpa is made king of Tammuz-an.
7	"The Pirates of Tarnoonga"	Ken Stephenson & Raymond Jafelice	Peter Sauder	October 19, 1985
While delivering fuel to Tammuz-an, Jann, Jessica, and the droids are captured by the pirate Kybo Ren-Cha. Aboard his stolen Star Destroyer, Kybo Ren takes them to the water planet Tarnoonga. After the heroes escape a giant sea monster, Jann and the droids distract the pirates by going after a decoy while Jessica recaptures the real fuel. After Jann and the droids escape, Mon Julpa sends forces to capture Ren.
8	"The Revenge of Kybo Ren"	Ken Stephenson & Raymond Jafelice	Peter Sauder	October 26, 1985
Kybo Ren is freed and he kidnaps Gerin, the daughter of Lord Toda, Mon Julpa's political rival. The droids, Jann, and Jessica go to the planet Bogden to rescue Gerin before Mon Julpa is handed over as ransom. Ren's men arrive with Julpa, but Lord Toda and a squad of Tammuz-an soldiers have smuggled aboard Ren's own ship. Ren is sent back to prison and an alliance is forged between Julpa and Toda. Jessica decides to return to her freighter business and says goodbye to her friends.
9	"Coby and the Starhunters"	Ken Stephenson & Raymond Jafelice	Joe Johnston & Peter Sauder	November 2, 1985
C-3PO and R2-D2 are assigned to chaperone Lord Toda's young son, Coby, only to be captured by smugglers. They are eventually rescued by Jann, only for the droids to learn that he has been accepted into the Imperial Space Academy, leaving them once again masterless and on their own.
The Adventures of Mungo Baobab
10	"Tail of the Roon Comets"	Ken Stephenson & Raymond Jafelice	Story by : Ben Burtt; Teleplay by : Michael Reaves	November 9, 1985
Mungo Baobab, with R2-D2 and C-3PO in tow, begins searching for the powerful Roonstones, but runs into an Imperial entanglement.
11	"The Roon Games"	Ken Stephenson & Raymond Jafelice	Story by : Ben Burtt; Teleplay by : Gordon Kent & Peter Sauder	November 16, 1985
Having escaped, Mungo, C-3PO and R2-D2 once again make their way for the planet Roon, but it turns out that they have not seen the last of General Koong, a de facto governor desperate to win the support of the Empire.
12	"Across the Roon Sea"	Ken Stephenson & Raymond Jafelice	Story by : Ben Burtt; Teleplay by : Sharman DiVono	November 23, 1985
Mungo has just about given up hope on finding Roonstones, and accompanied by the droids, is about to return to his home planet, Manda.
13	"The Frozen Citadel"	Ken Stephenson & Raymond Jafelice	Story by : Ben Burtt; Teleplay by : Paul Dini	November 30, 1985
Mungo and the droids continue their search for the Roonstones, but Koong makes trouble for them.
Hour-long special
SP	"The Great Heep"	Clive A. Smith	Ben Burtt	June 7, 1986
C-3PO and R2-D2 travel to Biitu with their new master, Mungo Baobab, and confront an Abominor-class droid named the Great Heep, which builds onto itself from the remains of other droids.

== Merchandising ==
In 1985, Kenner produced a toy line based on the series, including action figures, ship models, and other items. Two action figures, Boba Fett and A-wing Pilot, were repackaged figures from the main Star Wars line. The toy line was canceled after the first group of 12 figures due to decreasing popularity with Star Wars. In 1987 and then 1988, Glasslite of Brazil issued remaining Kenner stock and produced a very limited run of remaining Return of the Jedi and Droids toys from a sell off. Certain vehicles, mini-rigs and action figures were issued by the company in new packaging. The character Vlix (Tig Fromm's henchman) was an action figure exclusive from unused molds by Kenner. Like the remainder of the Glasslite line, very few were made, even less were sold and most were recycled due to the failing economy when money was tight across the country. Vlix was the most valuable Star Wars action figure (at about $6,000 carded or $1,200 loose), until a Fett figure sold for £69,000 (US$92,000) at an auction.

Between 1985 and 1987, a number of episodes were adapted into children's storybooks.

A computer game was released in 1988 for the ZX Spectrum, Amstrad CPC and Commodore 64 by Mastertronic.

In 2021, for Lucasfilm's 50th anniversary, Hasbro released a Target-exclusive line of action figures based on the series, featuring the titular droid duo and Boba Fett. Fett was also released as a larger Black Series figure.

In 2026, Hasbro has announced a new assortment of Black Series figures based on the series, featuring C-3PO, R2-D2, Boba Fett, and a Stormtrooper. Each figure is packed on a classic Kenner-inspired cardback.

=== Comic book series ===
In 1986, Marvel's Star Comics imprint published a Star Wars: Droids comic series spun off from the cartoon. The bi-monthly series ran for eight issues. Four issues and issue 5's cover of the series were drawn by John Romita, Sr. The "Lost in Time" crossover story from Droids #4 was continued in an issue of Ewoks. The last three issues are part of an arc recounting the original Star Wars film from the droids' point of view. Additionally, Spanish comics publisher Editorial Gepsa produced two-page Droids comics as part of an anthology series.

Other Star Wars comics subtitled Droids have featured C-3PO and R2-D2, but not in direct connection with the series.

== Home media ==
Almost all episodes of the series (except "Coby and the Starhunters") were released on VHS in the 1980s and 1990s, most notably the UK PAL releases over four cassettes (Droids 1–3 and The Great Heep), which had the opening sequences and credits edited out. In 1996, Rick McCallum produced The Pirates and the Prince, a direct-to-video film compiled from four episodes. In late 2004, McCallum and Lucasfilm produced a DVD titled Star Wars: Animated Adventures – Droids, which featured The Pirates and the Prince and Treasure of the Hidden Planet, a new compilation film including narration from Mungo Baobab (voiced by Alex Lindsay). This was released by 20th Century Fox in 2005. Both titles included some soundtrack changes.

On April 2, 2021, it was announced that the entire series would be released on Disney+ later in 2021. All 13 episodes, along with the special, were added on June 18, 2021.

== Reception ==
According to David Perlmutter, compared with Ewoks, Droids "was rudimentary, with short enough story lines for as many as four narratives in a single episode. Obviously, neither Lucas nor the animation studio had enough faith in the characters to trust them as anything other than second bananas." SyFy Wire writes that "Droids struggles to find a way to make the duo's live-action antics as entertaining on the small screen as they are on the silver one; the show tries to serve up a very, very kid-friendly take on that galaxy far, far away and it doesn't always hit the mark." ComicBook.com calls it a "must-watch".

== Legacy ==
Ben Burtt wrote liner notes for the Shadows of the Empire soundtrack, which referenced the Roonstones he had written about in Droids; Burtt made a cameo appearance in Episode I – The Phantom Menace and named his character after the Baobabs. Several references to the animated series are made in the prequels, such as the Boonta Eve Classic in The Phantom Menace, the planet Bogden and a four-armed cook in Attack of the Clones, and General Grievous' wheel bike design in Revenge of the Sith.

Genndy Tartakovsky gave C-3PO moving, expressive eyes in Clone Wars (2003) to pay homage to his previous animated appearances in Nelvana's Star Wars Holiday Special (1978) and Droids. While Droids was excluded in the 2014 rebranding of Star Wars canon, recurring villain Admiral Screed—whom A Guide to the Star Wars Universe describes as "the Emperor's right-hand man during the early days of the Empire"—makes appearances in canon novels such as Tarkin (2014) and Aftermath: Life Debt (2016). Additionally, possible sources of inspiration for sequel trilogy main characters Rey and Kylo Ren have been noticed.
