= Star Wars: Return of the Jedi: Ewok Adventure =

Cancelled Star Wars video game

Ewok Adventure on Atari 2600

Star Wars: Return of the Jedi: Ewok Adventure, also known as Revenge of the Jedi: Game I, is a cancelled 1983 shoot 'em up video game based on the 1983 Star Wars film Return of the Jedi. The game was designed and programmed by Larry Gelberg of Parker Brothers, which was scheduled to publish it on the Atari 2600. Although it was completed (although this has never been confirmed), the game was never released for sale, as the marketing department of Parker Brothers considered the controls too difficult to master. A prototype cartridge surfaced in 1997.

== Release ==
Only one physical copy of Ewok Adventure is currently known to exist. Because the game's controls were more complex than had been the norm on console games at the time, Parker Brothers persuaded designer Larry Gelberg to change the controls to a more common 8-direction lay-out. However, Gelberg was convinced of the abilities of the game's potential players, prompting Parker Brothers to shut the project down. Larry Gelberg gave the only known prototype of the game to his colleague's son in 1997, who later sold the game for $1,680.

== Gameplay ==
In Ewok Adventure, the player takes the role of an Ewok in the hang glider corps with the mission to destroy a shield generator of the Imperial army. The player can control a hang glider with the joystick and has to evade enemies, which include animations of speeder bikes, AT-ST walkers, Imperial stormtrooper-like figures and Ewoks. Other obstacles along the edges of the game include shrubbery, small boulders and small rivers.

Depending on the game mode, the player can either make the hang glider climb and descend by pulling back and forth the joystick, or he can reverse the vertical directions. Hitting the ground results in a game over, but when flying high, one can fly over enemies. The height of the glider is displayed by the location of the shadow of the ship. Furthermore, the player can pick up rocks to drop on enemies when flying over them.
