= Eric Walker (entertainer) =

American actor

- Born: 1970 (age 55–56); Upland, California
- Occupations: Actor and music producer
- Notable work: Having It All, The Circle Family, Webster, Star Wars: Ewok Adventures

Eric Walker (born as Anthony Eric Todd Walker) is a former actor, music producer and occasional film/television producer.

== Personal life and career ==
Born in 1970 in Upland, California to father Gene Winston Walker II. Eric began to fulfill his mother's dream that he and his siblings, including Gene Winston Walker III, would become actors when he appeared in a Jack in the Box commercial at age 6. By age eleven, Walker was determined to pursue his dream of acting. He soon after came into contact with a couple of agents which got him into his first television roles such as Webster. Walker later went on to play the role of Mace Towani in Caravan of Courage: An Ewok Adventure and Ewoks: The Battle for Endor set in the Star Wars expanded universe after being recruited by Lucasfilm.

He had guest appearances on the television shows The New Leave It to Beaver and Filthy Rich and played Robert Downey Jr.'s younger brother in the film Less than Zero.

Walker has been inactive from playing roles in films since 2006, but intends to pursue future projects. Walker also planned on writing a book of his memoirs including his role as Mace Towani and experiences with fellow actor Warwick Davis and the rest of the cast. The book "Growing up on Skywalker Ranch" was planned for publication in 2008 but is currently requiring funding to be produced. He has also separately worked with Davis in producing documentaries about participating in the Ewok adventure films.

Walker currently works as a music producer and has also produced audio tracks themed on the Star Wars universe.

Walker currently runs his website, All For SciFi, along with his podcast of the same name. Walker records videos and podcast episodes with his co-host, Captain Rickster, as they discuss all topics having to do with sci-fi movies, television shows, and more.

== Filmography ==
=== Film ===
| Year | Title | Role | Notes |
|---|---|---|---|
| 1982 | The Circle Family | Morris | TV movie |
| 1982 | Having It All | Peter | TV movie |
| 1984 | Caravan of Courage: An Ewok Adventure | Mace Towani | TV movie |
| 1985 | Ewoks: The Battle for Endor | Mace Towani | TV movie |
| 1987 | Less Than Zero | Seth Wells | |
| 1989 | She's Out of Control | Volleyball Player | |
| 1991 | And You Thought Your Parents Were Weird | Dwayne Kotswinkle | |
| 2005 | Getting’ Da Munchies | "Sleepy" | Video |
| 2006 | Shadows in the Woods | Agent Derek Heimy | Video |
| 2014 | Making of Star Wars Caravan of Courage an Ewok Adventure | Himself | Director/Writer/Producer (short) |

=== Television ===
| Year | Title | Role | Notes |
|---|---|---|---|
| 1983 | Webster | "Tiny" | 1 episode |
| 1986 | The New Leave It to Beaver | Raich | 1 episode |
| 1986 | The Magical World of Disney | Scratch | S31E03: ‘’Little Spies’’ |
| 1990 | The Marshall Chronicles | | 1 episode |
| 2020 | The Flimflam and Gorky Show | | Composer |
| 2021 | Echo Base Network | Himself | 1 episode |

=== Radio ===
| Year | Title | Role | Notes |
|---|---|---|---|
| 2022 | Funny Science Fiction Podcast | Himself – Guest | 1 episode |
| 2023 | Heroes of Extinction | Ringneck (voice) | 1 episode (audio drama) |
