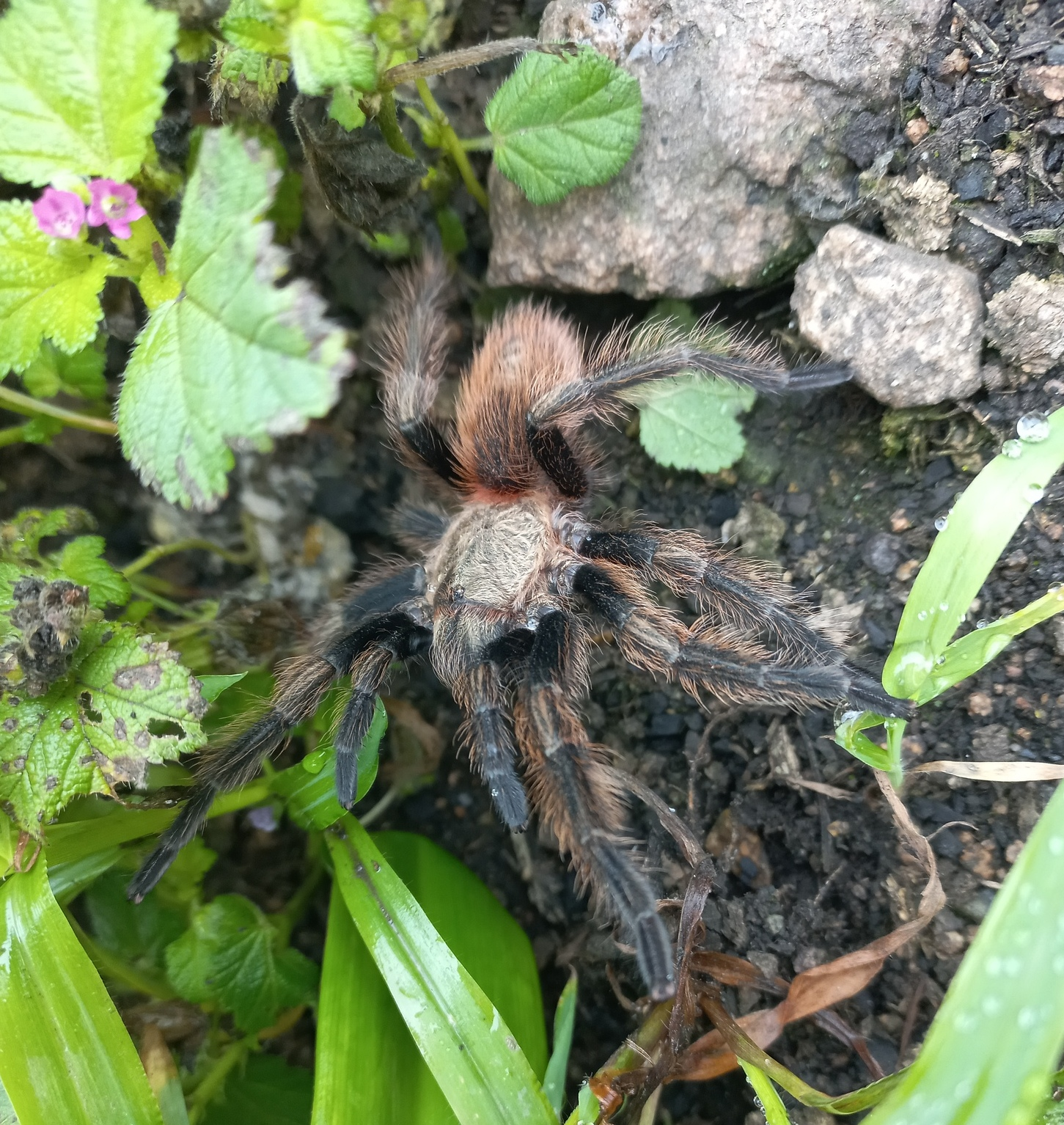
- E. christineae
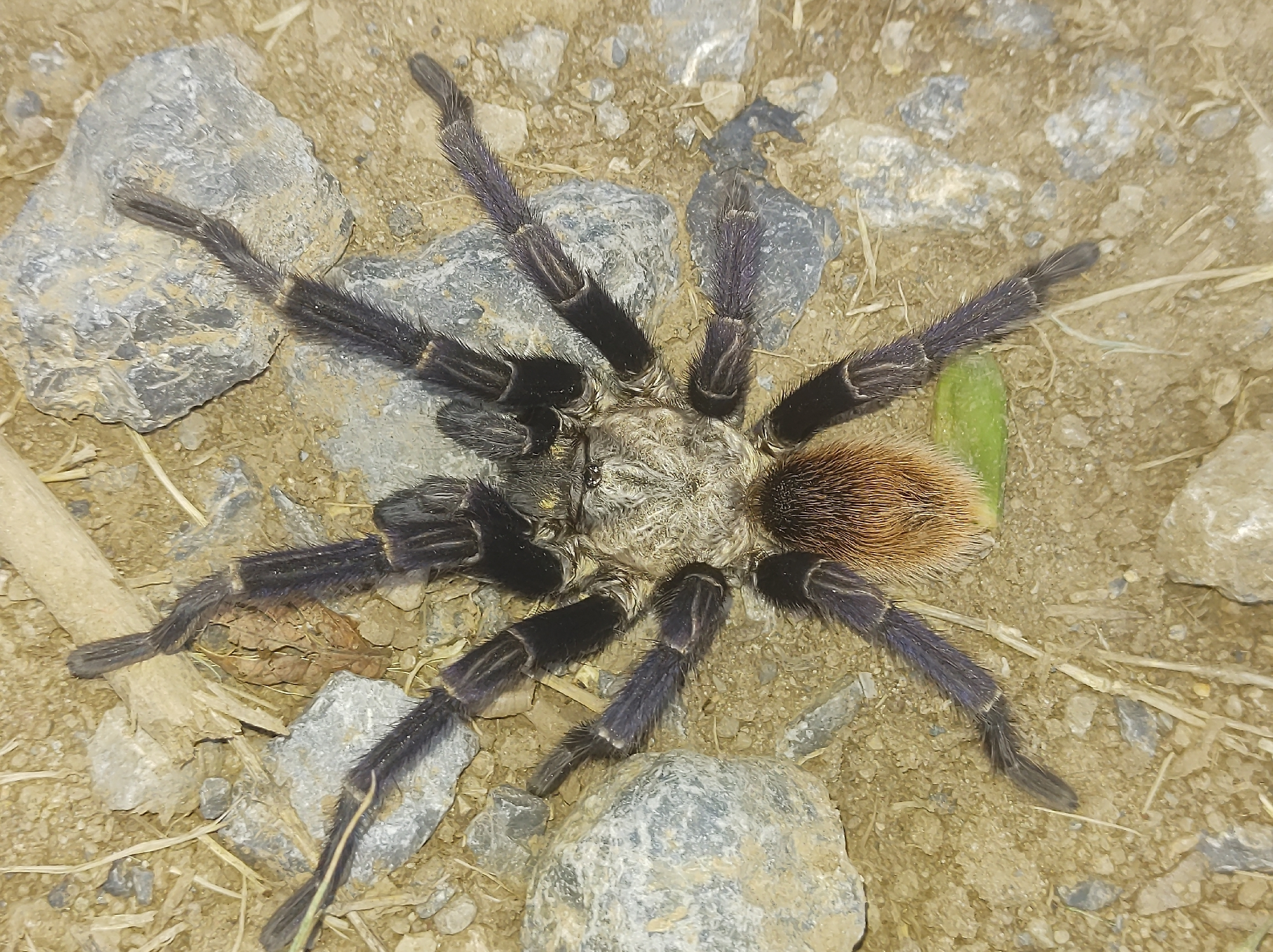
- E. aymara

Scientific classification
- Kingdom: Animalia
- Phylum: Arthropoda
- Subphylum: Chelicerata
- Class: Arachnida
- Order: Araneae
- Infraorder: Mygalomorphae
- Family: Theraphosidae
- Genus: Ewok; Peñaherrera-R., Sherwood, Gabriel, León-E., Rollard, Leguin, Brescovit & Lucas, 2025

Type species
- Thrixopelma christineae Sherwood & Gabriel, 2024

Species
- 8, see text

= Ewok (spider) =

Genus of spiders

Ewok is a genus of spiders in the family Theraphosidae.

== Distribution ==
The genus Ewok is endemic to Peru.

== Etymology ==
The genus is named after the Ewoks, which are also small and furry. According to the original authors, »just as the Ewok language is difficult to understand, the taxonomy of these spiders is similarly complex and challenging«.

== Species ==
As of January 2026, this genus includes eight species:

- Ewok aycaramba Sherwood, Gabriel, Peñaherrera-R., León-E., Rollard, Leguin, Brescovit & Lucas, 2025 – Peru
- Ewok aymara (Chamberlin, 1916) – Peru
- Ewok christineae (Sherwood & Gabriel, 2024) – Peru
- Ewok cyaneolus (Schmidt, Friebolin & Friebolin, 2005) – Peru
- Ewok eliseanneae (Sherwood & Gabriel, 2024) – Peru
- Ewok kainae Gabriel, Sherwood, Peñaherrera-R., León-E., Rollard, Leguin, Brescovit & Lucas, 2025 – Peru
- Ewok kimraykawsaki (Signorotto, Ferretti, Chaparro, Ochoa & West, 2025) – Peru
- Ewok pruriens (Schmidt, 1998) – Peru, not Chile
