= Star Wars: Ewoks =

American-Canadian animated cartoon series based on Star Wars

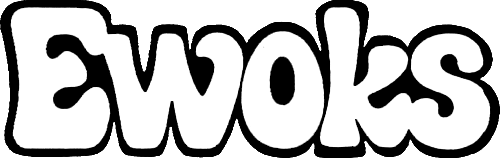
- Based on: Star Wars by George Lucas
- Developed by: Paul Dini; Bob Carrau
- Directed by: Raymond Jafelice (season 1); Ken Stephenson; Dale Schott (season 2)
- Voices of: Jim Henshaw; Denny Delk; Cree Summer; Jeanne Reynolds; Eric Peterson; James Cranna; Doug Chamberlain; George Buza; Alyson Court; Rick Cimino; Pauline LeSauvage
- Countries of origin: United States; Canada
- No. of seasons: 2
- No. of episodes: 26 (35 segments)

Production
- Executive producers: Miki Herman (season 1); Cliff Ruby (season 2); Elana Lesser (season 2)
- Producers: Michael Hirsh; Patrick Loubert; Clive A. Smith
- Running time: 22 minutes
- Production companies: Nelvana Limited; Lucasfilm

Original release
- Network: ABC
- Release: September 7, 1985 – December 13, 1986

Related
- Star Wars: Droids

Star Wars: Ewoks, also simply known as Ewoks, is an animated series featuring the Ewok characters introduced in Star Wars: Episode VI – Return of the Jedi (1983) and further discovered in Caravan of Courage: An Ewok Adventure (1984) and its sequel Ewoks: The Battle for Endor (1985). The series was co-produced by Canada-based Nelvana Limited on behalf of Lucasfilm and broadcast on ABC from September 7, 1985 to December 13, 1986, with its sister series Droids (as part of The Ewoks and Droids Adventure Hour), and then by itself, as The All-New Ewoks.

== Premise ==
The series centers on the adventures of Wicket W. Warrick and his friends on the forest moon of Endor before the events of the original Star Wars film (Note: Later titled Star Wars: Episode IV – A New Hope) and Caravan of Courage. (Note: Unlike the live-action films, the Ewoks primarily speak English instead of their native language.) The primary recurring villains are Morag the Tulgah Witch, who had a personal grudge against the tribe's shaman, Master Logray, and the Duloks, a rival species. (Note: Duloks are explained by official sources to be related to Ewoks.)

The penultimate episode, "Battle for the Sunstar", which was reaired as the series finale, shows the Ewok heroes leaving the forest moon's surface when they go aboard an Imperial Star Destroyer that has traveled to their system. An Imperial scientist attempts to destroy the Emperor, whose shuttle makes an appearance. The episode has been noted as forming a link with Return of the Jedi, which features the Empire using Endor as its base of operations for the second Death Star.

== Cast and characters ==
=== The Ewok tribe ===
==== Warrick family ====
- Wicket Wystri Warrick (voiced by Jim Henshaw then Denny Delk) – The youngest brother of the Warrick Family. He is headstrong and determined and often takes the initiative. Wicket really wants to be a great warrior, which often gets him into trouble. Has dark brown fur and wears an orange hood, but wears a green hood in season two.
- Widdle "Willy" Warrick (voiced by John Stocker) – The middle brother of the Warrick Family. Originally called Widdle. He is clumsy, gluttonous and overweight, but exceedingly nice.
- Weechee Warrick (voiced by Greg Swanson) – The eldest brother and the strongest of the Warrick Family.
- Winda Warrick – The youngest child of the Warrick Family.
- Deej Warrick (voiced by Richard Donat) – Father to Wicket, Weechee, Willy and Winda and his wife is Shodu. A very respected warrior of the Ewok tribe. Has dark grey fur and wears a purple hood.
- Shodu Warrick (voiced by Nonnie Griffin then Esther Scott) – Deej's wife and mother to Wicket, Weechee, Willy and Winda.
- Erpham Warrick (voiced by Anthony Parr) – Wicket's great-grandfather, once a great warrior for the Ewok tribe and is still looked up to by young Ewoks. Not much is known about Erpham, as he died years ago, but he makes a brief appearance as a ghost when Wicket tries to repair his old battle wagon and instructs him. He was a golden-colored Ewok with a green hood.

==== Kintaka family ====
- Princess Kneesaa a Jari Kintaka (voiced by Cree Summer then Jeanne Reynolds) – Younger daughter of Chief Chirpa and Ra-Lee. Often the voice of reason and wisdom to her friends, but usually ends up in just as much trouble. She seems smitten with Wicket. Has white and grey fur and wears a pink hood with a blue gem dangling near her forehead.
- Asha (voiced by Paulina Gillis) – Older daughter of Chief Chirpa and Ra-Lee. Went missing during Ra-Lee's death and eventually was reunited with the Ewoks.
- Chief Chirpa (voiced by George Buza then Rick Cimino) – Widowed father to Kneesaa and Asha. He gives order to the warriors when they are fighting against the Duloks.
- Paploo (voiced by Paul Chato) – Kneesaa's cousin, Great Chief Chirpa's nephew and son to Bozzie. He is close friends with Wicket and Teebo. He sometimes joins in when the young Ewoks go on their adventures. He is older, but often acts with less maturity than the younger Ewoks. Has grey fur, with a white face and wears an orange hood with a feather.
- Bozzie (voice by Pam Hyatt) – Chief Chirpa's sister / sister-in-law and mother to Paploo. She can be very bossy and domineering towards the young Ewoks.

==== Teebo's family ====
- Teebo (voiced by Eric Peterson then James Cranna.) – Wicket's best friend and the older child of Warok and Batcheela. (Note: Teebo and Malani's mother, Batcheela, does not appear in the series but is mentioned in two episodes.) Fascinated by tales of sorcery and magic becomes his Master Logray's Apprentice. He is a bit of a dreamer, and sometimes a little clumsy. Teebo often lacks discipline, but this is something he learns to master over time from Logray, and eventually becomes a respectful young Ewok. Has ochre fur and he wears a tan, baggy hood with a feather.
- Malani (voiced by Alyson Court) – The younger child of Warok and Batcheela. She is a close friends with Wiley, Nippet and Winda. She has a crush on Wicket and desperately tries to impress him. Has beige fur and wears a blue hood with a flower in it.

==== Latara's family ====
- Latara (voiced by Taborah Johnson then Sue Murphy) – Has dark grey fur and wears a yellow hat with a pink feather in it in season one; in season two her fur is light brown and cream, and her hat is heather with a greenish-blue feather. Kneesaa is her best friend. She dreams of being a great musician with her flute, though her main job appears to be looking after her younger siblings. She has a huge crush on Teebo, though he rarely notices it. In the second season, it is the other way round.
- Nippet and Wiley (voiced by Leanne Coppen and Michael Fantini, respectively) – Latara's younger siblings. At times, Latara has to stay home to watch over them.
- Zephee – The mother of Latara, Nippet and Wiley. She was seen in three episodes: "The Haunted Village", "The Travelling Jindas" and "The Curse of the Jindas".
- Lumat – The father of Latara, Nippet and Wiley. He was seen in two episodes: "The Travelling Jindas" and "The Curse of the Jindas".

Various

- Master Logray (voiced by Doug Chamberlain) – The Ewoks' shaman, and often the dispenser of wisdom and knowledge about the world of Endor.

=== Others ===
- King Gorneesh (voiced by Dan Hennessey and then Cody Ryan) – A leader of the Duloks
- Queen Urga (voiced by Melleny Brown) – King Gorneesh's wife and the only female Dulok in the series
- Umwak (voiced by Don Francks) – Gorneesh's right-hand man, a Dulok shaman
- Morag (voiced by Jackie Burroughs) – The Tulgah witch and evil magic counterpart of Logray
- The Phlogs – A race of giants who live on Endor (though they originated offworld)
- Baga – A young gentle bordok and Wicket's personal pet
- The Hanadak – A purple monster which lives in the forest
- The Jindas – A race of canid aliens who live on Endor, and are cursed to an eternal nomadic lifestyle by the Rock Wizard. The Ewoks free them from their curse. Notable Jindas include their leader, Bondo, and magician Trebla.
- The Raich – A tree demon that eats animals and was imprisoned by brave Ewok warriors with a magical hat, made by the Gonster, which was placed on its head, turning it into a tree. He is revived when Wicket takes the hat, but eventually defeated again.
- The Gonster – A two-headed magician whom Ewoks seek out for spells, potions and traps to defeat monsters. His two heads constantly argue.
- The Leaf Queen – A plantlike deity or spirit who dwells on Endor and is entrusted to the care of all its plants. Although kindly, she can be roused to great anger if her plants are harmed.
- Dr. Raygar – An Imperial scientist who wants to steal the Sunstar and use it to overthrow the Emperor. After Kazz eventually learns of his treachery, he is arrested for treason.
- Admiral Kazz – An Imperial officer tasked with assisting Raygar, who does not know his true intentions. Kazz thinks the Sunstar is a myth and considers the Ewoks not worth bothering over.
- PD-28 – An Imperial droid assisting Raygar and Kazz. He eventually tires of working for the abusive Raygar and becomes friends with the Ewoks.
- Ploob - A one-time character from the episode "Horville's Hut of Horrors" is a floating green monster that frightens the Ewoks and steals their honey and jam.

== Production ==
The series is a follow-up (later stated to be a prequel) to the two Ewok films: Caravan of Courage (1984) and The Battle for Endor (1985), which were themselves spin-offs (and prequels) of Return of the Jedi. The first season of the series was somewhat sophisticated, but in the second, the writing and visual style were both simplified.

== Episodes ==
=== Season 1 (1985) ===
The theme song for the first season was written and performed by Taj and Inshirah Mahal.

| No. overall | No. in season | Title | Directed by | Written by | Original release date |
|---|---|---|---|---|---|
| 1 | 1 | "The Cries of the Trees" | Ken Stephenson & Raymond Jafelice | Paul Dini | September 7, 1985 |
Morag captures Izrina, Queen of the Wisties, (Note: Originally introduced in the live-action Caravan of Courage: An Ewok Adventure) and forces her to set fire to the forest. The young Ewoks extinguish the flames via glider.
| 2 | 2 | "The Haunted Village" | Ken Stephenson & Raymond Jafelice | Paul Dini | September 14, 1985 |
Master Logray has developed invisibility soap to hide the Sunberry Trees from the destructive Mantigrue. The Ewoks manage to save the trees, despite the Duloks' interference.
| 3 | 3 | "Rampage of the Phlogs" | Ken Stephenson & Raymond Jafelice | Paul Dini | September 21, 1985 |
Morag prompts a family of Phlogs to rampage the Ewok village. Wicket and his friends rescue and return to the Phlogs their baby from the Duloks.
| 4 | 4 | "To Save Deej" | Ken Stephenson & Raymond Jafelice | Bob Carrau | September 28, 1985 |
The Warrick brothers are tasked to find ingredients for Master Logray to brew a poison cure for Deej. A creature called Mring-Mring ensures their quest is a success.
| 5 | 5 | "The Traveling Jindas" | Ken Stephenson & Raymond Jafelice | Bob Carrau | October 5, 1985 |
Lacking appreciation for her flute-playing, Latara joins the Travelling Jindas. Wicket and his friends rescue Latara from becoming lost and the Duloks.
| 6 | 6 | "The Tree of Light" | Ken Stephenson & Raymond Jafelice | Bob Carrau | October 12, 1985 |
Wicket, Princess Kneesaa and Latara follow uninvited an expedition on a quest to restore the tree of life, the Duloks intent on destroying the tree.
| 7 | 7 | "The Curse of the Jindas" | Ken Stephenson & Raymond Jafelice | Bob Carrau | October 19, 1985 |
Master Logray stops the curse that affects the Jindas after they rescue Wicket and his friends from the Skandits. This angers the Rock Wizard, but Princess Kneesaa has the stone tooth to cure the wizard's pain.
| 8 | 8 | "The Land of the Gupins" | Ken Stephenson & Raymond Jafelice | Bob Carrau | October 26, 1985 |
After rescuing Mring-Mring's brother, Oobel, Wicket and his friends journey with them to save the Gupins' homeland from the Grass Trekkers.
| 9 | 9 | "Sunstar vs. Shadowstone" | Ken Stephenson & Raymond Jafelice | Paul Dini | November 2, 1985 |
Morag captures Teebo and his friends as ransom for the Sunstar. Morag utilizes the full power of the combined Sunstar-Shadowstone, but Master Logray destroys her for good.
| 10 | 10 | "Wicket's Wagon" | Ken Stephenson & Raymond Jafelice | Paul Dini | November 9, 1985 |
Inspired by his ancestor, Wicket rebuilds an old battle wagon. The Duloks steal it, but Wicket and Malani jump aboard and collapse the wagon.
| 11 | 11 | "The Three Lessons" | Ken Stephenson & Raymond Jafelice | Bob Carrau | November 16, 1985 |
Princess Kneesaa goes with Wicket to gather ingredients to shrink a Stranglethorn she accidentally overgrew. With the help of some Tromes, Wicket gets the required potion.
| 12 | 12 | "Blue Harvest" | Ken Stephenson & Raymond Jafelice | Paul Dini & Sam Wilson | November 23, 1985 |
In a plot to steal the Ewoks' harvest, Umwak unwittingly causes a Phlog named Hoona to romance with Wicket. The Duloks take advantage of this, but Wicket turns Hoona against them.
| 13 | 13 | "Asha" | Ken Stephenson & Raymond Jafelice | Paul Dini | November 30, 1985 |
Kneesaa and Wicket find Kneesaa's long-lost sister, Asha, and help her to repel the Duloks hunting defenseless creatures, before reuniting her with Chief Chirpa.

=== Season 2 (1986) ===
With this season, advertised as The All-New Ewoks, episodes are now shorted the 11-minute format meaning two segments per half-hour (with the exceptions of "The Raich", "Night of the Stranger", "The Season Scepter" and "Battle for the Sunstar"). This season introduced a new theme song, "Friends Together, Friends Forever", written and performed by Patrick Gleeson.

| No. overall | No. in season | Title | Directed by | Written by | Original release date |
|---|---|---|---|---|---|
| 14 | 1 | "The Crystal Cloak" | Ken Stephenson & Dale Schott | Paul Dini | September 13, 1986 |
| 14 | 1 | "The Wish Plant" | Ken Stephenson & Dale Schott | Bob Carrau | September 13, 1986 |
An ambitious Wicket goes with his friends on a quest for the crystal cloak stolen by the Gracca. They end up destroying the crystal cloak instead. The leaf queen assigns Kneesa to care for a wish plant. Her friends abuse the plant with their wishes. Kneesa manages to restore the plant before the leaf queen's arrival.
| 15 | 2 | "Home Is Where the Shrieks Are" | Ken Stephenson & Dale Schott | Bob Carrau | September 20, 1986 |
| 15 | 2 | "Princess Latara" | Ken Stephenson & Dale Schott | Paul Dini | September 20, 1986 |
Wicket and Teebo try to live by themselves in a house inhabited by Larry the Shriek, who convinces them they are better off back at home. The Gorph Queen Slugga kidnaps Latara masquerading as a princess for her son to marry. Wicket and his friends rescue Latara and trap the Gorphs.
| 16 | 3 | "The Raich" | Ken Stephenson & Dale Schott | Michael Reaves | September 27, 1986 |
Wicket accidentally unleashes the Raich from its tree form prison. With some help from the two-headed Gonster, Wicket and his friends trap the Raich as it was before.
| 17 | 4 | "The Totem Master" | Ken Stephenson & Dale Schott | Bob Carrau | October 4, 1986 |
| 17 | 4 | "A Gift for Shodu" | Ken Stephenson & Dale Schott | Paul Dini | October 4, 1986 |
Creatures in the guise of a totem led by the master rob the Ewok village. Wicket and his friends follow the master and destroy him along with his curse. Wicket and his friends venture into an ancient temple to get a jewel for Shodu's birthday. That jewels turns out to be an egg of the Scuver Dragon.
| 18 | 5 | "Night of the Stranger" | Ken Stephenson & Dale Schott | Paul Dini | October 11, 1986 |
A phantom has the Duloks raid the Ewok village to steal the Sunstar. Wicket and his friends manage to prevent a phantom exodus from taking place.
| 19 | 6 | "Gone with the Mimphs" | Ken Stephenson & Dale Schott | Linda Woolverton | October 18, 1986 |
| 19 | 6 | "The First Apprentice" | Ken Stephenson & Dale Schott | Paul Dini | October 18, 1986 |
Wicket is captured by the Mimphs after a failed hunt for a Hanadak, but then he has to rescue them from the rampaging Hanadak. Ex-Apprentice Zarrak tries to teach Teebo his secrets but tires of his failures. Wicket, his friends rescue Teebo and Teebo masters enough magic to defeat Zarrak.
| 20 | 7 | "Hard Sell" | Ken Stephenson & Dale Schott | Michael Reaves | October 25, 1986 |
| 20 | 7 | "A Warrior and a Lurdo" | Ken Stephenson & Dale Schott | Michael Dubil | October 25, 1986 |
Wicket and his friends compete selling Mooth's goods for some valuable horns, but they end up empty-handed. Teebo flunks at Wicket's warrior training, but is asked by the Tambles to chase away a creature named Blog. Teebo sticks with magic to destroy the Blog's dam.
| 21 | 8 | "The Season Scepter" | Ken Stephenson & Dale Schott | Bob Carrau | November 1, 1986 |
Pressured by Odra, the Snow King freezes the lands of Endor. Wicket and his friends restore the balance of Endor's seasons after liberating the season scepter.
| 22 | 9 | "Prow Beaten" | Ken Stephenson & Dale Schott | Bob Carrau | November 8, 1986 |
| 22 | 9 | "Baga's Rival" | Ken Stephenson & Dale Schott | Linda Woolverton | November 8, 1986 |
Wicket and his friends accidentally lose Chirpa's canoe prow carving to the Duloks. While trying to get it back, they destroy Urga's battleship. Kneesa takes in a quarf (a shapeshifting monster) sent to hold her ransom for the Sunstar. Wicket and Baga come to the rescue.
| 23 | 10 | "Horville's Hut of Horrors" | Ken Stephenson & Dale Schott | Paul Dini | November 15, 1986 |
| 23 | 10 | "The Tragic Flute" | Ken Stephenson & Dale Schott | Bob Carrau | November 15, 1986 |
A visit to Horville's Hut of Horrors puts the woklings into a crying fit. An attempt to hide the truth only makes Wicket regret it. Latara gets captured by a creature who takes greedy people to be his slaves so Wicket, Kneesaa and Teebo have to rescue her, but to get out Latara must pass a test.
| 24 | 11 | "Just My Luck" | Ken Stephenson & Dale Schott | Michael Dubil | November 22, 1986 |
| 24 | 11 | "Bringing Up Norky" | Ken Stephenson & Dale Schott | Bob Carrau & Earl Kress | November 22, 1986 |
Wicket experiences bad luck when he takes his warrior's test. To Wicket's chagrin, his family babysits the unruly Norky.
| 25 | 12 | "Battle for the Sunstar" | Ken Stephenson & Dale Schott | Paul Dini | December 6, 1986 (Note: Re-aired on January 10, 1987 to end the series) |
Doctor Raygar, a mad scientist from the Galactic Empire arrives to steal the Sunstar and it is up to Wicket and his friends to stop him; re-aired as the series finale.
| 26 | 13 | "Party Ewok" | Ken Stephenson & Dale Schott | Bob Carrau | December 13, 1986 |
| 26 | 13 | "Malani the Warrior" | Ken Stephenson & Dale Schott | Stephen Langford | December 13, 1986 |
Kneesaa's friends save her from a gang. Malani wants to join the warrior games, but some thieves come to take the Sunstar.

== Broadcast and home media ==
Ewoks was broadcast on ABC, originally with its sister series Droids (as part of The Ewoks and Droids Adventure Hour), and then by itself, as The All-New Ewoks. The series ran for two seasons of 13 half-hour episodes between 1985 and 1986 and was later shown in reruns on Sci-Fi Channel's Cartoon Quest.

Almost all of the episodes (except for "The Three Lessons" and "Prow Beaten / Baga's Rival") were released on VHS in the 1980s and 1990s, most notably the UK PAL releases over six cassettes (Ewoks 1–6), which had the opening sequences and credits edited out. On April 2, 2021, the entire series was released on Disney+.

During the making of the Star Wars prequel trilogy, its producer, Rick McCallum, oversaw two direct-to-video compilation films, each compiled from four episodes of the series. The first, The Haunted Village, was released on VHS in 1997. The second, Tales from the Endor Woods, was released by 20th Century Fox Home Entertainment in 2004 on a DVD titled Star Wars: Animated Adventures – Ewoks (which also features The Haunted Village). The newer film includes narration from "Adult Wicket" (voiced by Alex Lindsay).

| Title | Content | Format |
|---|---|---|
| Ewoks 1: Morag's Revenge | "The Haunted Village", "The Cries of the Trees", "Rampage of the Phlogs", "Sunstar vs. Shadowstone" | VHS |
| Ewoks 2: The Gupins and the Jindas | "To Save Deej", "The Land of the Gupins", "The Traveling Jindas", "The Curse of the Jindas" | VHS |
| Ewoks 3: Wicket the Hero | "Wicket's Wagon", "The Tree of Light", "Asha", "Blue Harvest" | VHS |
| Ewoks 4: Wicket's Adventurers as He Becomes a Warrior | "The Crystal Cloak / The Wish Plant", "The Totem Master / A Gift for Shodu", "Horville's Hut of Horrors / The Tragic Flute", "Just My Luck / Bringing Up Norky" | VHS |
| Ewoks 5: Wickett's Adventurers | "Home Is Where the Shrieks Are / Princess Latara", "Gone with the Mimphs / The First Apprentice", "Party Ewok / Malani the Warrior", "Hard Sell / A Warrior and a Lurdo" | VHS |
| Ewoks 6: Battle for the Planet Endor | "Battle for the Sunstar", "The Season Scepter", "The Raich", "Night of the Stranger" | VHS |
| The Haunted Village | "The Haunted Village", "The Cries of the Trees", "Rampage of the Phlogs", "Sunstar vs. Shadowstone" | VHS / DVD |
| Tales from the Endor Woods | "Wicket's Wagon", "The Traveling Jindas", "To Save Deej", "Asha" | DVD |

== Reception ==
According to David Perlmutter, Ewoks was "unremarkable both technically and creatively." Screen Rant says the series was made at a time when "television executives had no idea what constituted good children's animated television", comparing it to series like The Smurfs, Snorks, or Care Bears. SyFy Wire calls the series "more a marketing ploy for Lucasfilm than a worthwhile extension of the franchise ... designed to sell toys, cereals, and action figures", though mentions that it "featured a few surprisingly entertaining installments that appealed to both parents and kids, particularly the penultimate episode, 'Battle for the Sunstar.'"

== Legacy ==
Elements from the series are featured in Star Wars reference media, such as A Guide to the Star Wars Universe and the Star Wars Encyclopedia. A Dulok was shown on Coruscant in Chapter 21 of the 2D animated Clone Wars (2003). Ewoks was excluded from canon status in 2014, but some elements appear in the canon Ultimate Star Wars (2015) and later reference books, as well as the canon web series Star Wars Forces of Destiny (2018).

The series' opening titles are briefly featured in an episode of Stranger Things' fourth season (2022).

The episode titled “Horville’s Hut of Horrors” has become especially famous after YouTube and Twitch personality DougDoug and his community got into a viral debate about whether a monster from the episode was named “Poob” or “Ploob.”

== Merchandising and media ==
=== Action figures ===
In 1985, Kenner Products produced a series of action figures based on the series. A second wave of figures were prototyped but ultimately cancelled due to poor sales of the initial wave. Several previously released Ewok themed vehicles, play sets, and accessories were advertised on the card backs of the figures but were curiously never offered in Ewoks Cartoon branded packaging.

=== Comics ===
In 1985, Star Comics, an imprint of Marvel, published a bi-monthly Ewoks comic based on the animated series. It ran for two years, with a total of 14 issues. Like the TV series, it was aimed towards a younger audience and produced parallel to a comic spun off from Droids. Issue #10 of Ewoks continued the "Lost in Time" crossover story from Droids #4. Additionally, Spanish comics publisher Editorial Gepsa produced two-page Ewoks comics as part of an anthology series.

A one-shot graphic novel bridging the gaps between the cartoon, the two Ewoks films, and Return of the Jedi titled Ewoks: Shadows of Endor was released in 2013.

== See also ==
- List of Star Wars television series
