= Peter Bernstein (composer) =

American composer

- Born: April 10, 1951 (age 73); New York City, New York, United States
- Occupation: Composer
- Years active: 1973–present
- Father: Elmer Bernstein

Peter Bernstein (born April 10, 1951) is an American film score composer, and is the son of Academy Award-winning composer and conductor Elmer Bernstein, with whom he frequently collaborated.

Notable films scored or co-scored by Peter Bernstein include Silent Rage (1982), Bolero (1984), The Ewok Adventure (1984), Ewoks: The Battle for Endor (1985), My Science Project (1985), Canadian Bacon (1995), Wild Wild West (1999) and Megiddo: The Omega Code 2 (2001).

He has also composed music for television series such as 21 Jump Street (1987), The New Outer Limits (1996; one episode, season 2, "Beyond the Veil"), Walker, Texas Ranger (1995; one episode, season 3, "The Big Bamboozle"), Stargate SG-1 (1997), Rough Riders (1997) and Masters of Horror (2005). He was a score consultant for Rob Simonsen for Ghostbusters: Afterlife, providing orchestration advice and feedback on Simonsen's implementation of Elmer Bernstein's Ghostbusters material. He also served as score consultant for Ghostbusters: Frozen Empire.
