= Caravan of Courage: An Ewok Adventure =

1984 TV film directed by John Korty

- Promotional release poster by Drew Struzan
- Also known as: The Ewok Adventure
- Genre: Adventure; Family; Fantasy; Science fiction
- Screenplay by: Bob Carrau
- Story by: George Lucas
- Directed by: John Korty
- Starring: Eric Walker; Warwick Davis; Fionnula Flanagan; Guy Boyd; Aubree Miller
- Narrated by: Burl Ives
- Music by: Peter Bernstein
- Country of origin: United States
- Original language: English

Production
- Executive producer: George Lucas
- Producers: Thomas G. Smith; Patricia Rose Duignan
- Cinematography: John Korty
- Editor: John Nutt
- Running time: 97 minutes
- Production companies: Lucasfilm; Korty Films

Original release
- Network: ABC
- Release: November 25, 1984

Related
- Ewoks: The Battle for Endor

The Ewok Adventure is a 1984 American television film based in the Star Wars universe. It takes place on the moon of Endor, and features the Ewoks, who help two young human siblings as they try to locate their parents. The film premiered on November 25, 1984 on ABC.

The film was given a limited international theatrical run, for which it was retitled Caravan of Courage: An Ewok Adventure. It was followed by a sequel, Ewoks: The Battle for Endor, in 1985.

== Plot ==
On the forest moon of Endor, a starcruiser lies wrecked. The Towani family – Catarine, Jeremitt, Mace and Cindel – are stranded. When Catarine and Jeremitt vanish, the children are found by the Ewok Deej. After Mace threatens them, the Ewoks subdue him and take both children to the Ewoks' home. There, Cindel befriends Wicket. Shortly thereafter, the Ewoks kill a boar wolf, only to find a life-monitor from one of the Towani parents with the creature.

They seek out the Ewok Logray, who informs them that the parents have been taken by the monstrous Gorax, which resides in a deserted, dangerous area. A caravan of Ewoks is formed to reunite the children with their parents. They meet a boisterous Ewok woodsman named Chukha-Trok, Kaink the Ewok priestess, and a wistie named Izrina before finally reaching the lair of the Gorax after a few mishaps on the way. The group engage the Gorax in battle, freeing Jeremitt and Catarine, but Chukha-Trok is fatally wounded. The Gorax is thought destroyed when it is knocked into a chasm, but it takes a final blow from Mace (using Chukha-Trok's axe) to defeat the creature, which tries to climb back up after them. The Towanis decide to stay with the Ewoks until they can repair the starcruiser, and Izrina leaves to return to her family.

== Cast ==
- Warwick Davis as Wicket W. Warrick
  - Darryl Henriques as Wicket (voice) (credited as Daryl Henriquez)
- Aubree Miller as Cindel Towani
- Eric Walker as Mace Towani
- Fionnula Flanagan as Catarine Towani
- Guy Boyd as Jeremitt Towani
- Daniel Frishman as Deej Warrick
  - Sydney Walker as Deej (voice)
- Debbie Lee Carrington as Weechee Warrick
- Tony Cox as Widdle "Willy" Warrick
- Kevin Thompson as Chukha-Trok
- Margarita Fernández as Kaink
- Pam Grizz as Shodu Warrick
- Bobby Bell as Logray
- Burl Ives as The Narrator (voice)

== Production ==
=== Inception ===
George Lucas had allowed the Star Wars universe to be produced for television in 1978 with the Star Wars Holiday Special, which proved to be an embarrassment. Lucas assumed greater control over a planned half-hour television project about Ewoks. He hired Thomas G. Smith to produce the film, after Smith had stepped down as the manager of Industrial Light & Magic (ILM) following his work on Indiana Jones and the Temple of Doom. Lucas also hired Bob Carrau, a personal assistant, to co-write the story with him.

When shopping the film around, Smith discovered that none of the TV networks at the time were interested in airing a half-hour special, but ABC showed interest in a two-hour movie of the week; the project was expanded to fill the request. The producers initially conceived of the project as a cross between "Hansel and Gretel" and Tarzan of the Apes. John Korty, who had directed the Lucas-produced Twice Upon a Time, was selected as director.

=== Staff and crew ===
Evolving from both a story written by George Lucas and a screenplay by Bob Carrau, director John Korty transformed the scenic Northern California film site, Roy's Redwoods Preserve in the San Geronimo Valley, with its verdant ferns and redwood trees, into the Ewoks' forest moon home of Endor. Joe Johnston, a veteran art director at ILM and one of the key concept artists of the classic Star Wars trilogy, acted as production designer and second-unit director. Prior to the film's release, he would also write and illustrate a book about the Ewoks, The Adventures of Teebo: A Tale of Magic and Suspense.

=== Visual effects ===
Both Ewok films were some of the last intensive stop-motion animation work ILM produced, as by the early 1980s, the technique was being replaced by go motion, an advanced form of animation with motorized puppets that move while the camera shutter is open. However, go motion was too expensive for the budgets of the Ewok films, so stop motion was used to realize creatures such as the Gorax.

The Ewok movies proved an opportunity for ILM to use a technique innovated for 2001: A Space Odyssey called latent image matte painting. In this technique, during live-action photography, a section of the camera lens is blocked off and remains unexposed. The film is rewound, the blocked areas reversed, and a painting crafted to occupy the space is photographed.

=== Music ===
The film score for Caravan of Courage was composed by Peter Bernstein. "Parade of the Ewoks", from John Williams' score to Star Wars: Return of the Jedi (1983), is credited as "Wicket's Theme" and is heard when the children are initially rescued and taken to the Ewok village, where they meet Wicket. Selections from the score were also released on LP by Varèse Sarabande in 1986. The release, titled Ewoks, contains additional cuts of Bernstein's score to the sequel Ewoks: The Battle for Endor (1985).

== Documentaries and commentary ==
During the shooting and production of Caravan of Courage, all school-aged children on the cast were placed on a tight schedule, having to divide their days evenly between school lessons and actual work on the film, including memorizing lines, learning cues, and ultimately, filming. During the shoot, Lucasfilm felt that it might be an educationally-rewarding and entertaining experience for the two lead teenage actors in the film, Eric Walker (Mace) and Warwick Davis (Wicket), both 15 at the time of production, to be given their own cameras to use between takes. Calling themselves W&W Productions, the two boys recorded their own mini-documentary of the production of the film, which was uploaded—nearly 30 years later—to Walker's YouTube channel in 2014.

== Adaptations ==
In 1985, Random House released a children's book adaptation of The Ewok Adventure by Amy Ehrlich, titled The Ewoks and the Lost Children, which includes stills from the film. There was also a release of a picture book with audiotape for those learning to read.

== Release ==
The Ewok Adventure was first shown on American television on November 25, 1984 on ABC. In its overseas theatrical release, it was renamed Caravan of Courage: An Ewok Adventure. The film was released on VHS and Laserdisc in 1990 through MGM under the original title.

The film was released on DVD as a double-feature collection with its sequel, Ewoks: The Battle for Endor, on November 23, 2004. The release was a double-sided disc, with one film on each side. For this release, the film bore the theatrical release title, Caravan of Courage.

Prior to 2021, Disney announced no plans to add the Ewok films to its streaming service, Disney+. This prompted Eric Walker to start a petition for Disney to add them. In March 2021, it was announced that both films would begin streaming on Disney+ on April 2, 2021.

== Reception ==
=== Critical response ===
In his review for The New York Times, John J. O'Connor noted the film's story as being almost "aggressively simple" and that "Mr. Lucas and crew do not come up with anything terribly astonishing." With Marin County serving as the backdrop, looking "like some never-never land east of the Sun and west of the Moon," O'Connor recognized most of the interactions as following well-established cinematic tropes, the notable ones being between Cindel "looking like one of those little blond angels used to top off Christmas trees" and Wicket, a performance by the-then 14-year-old Warwick Davis, whom O'Connor called "the cleverest of the lot."

Pointing to the main characters and plot elements, one pair of writers concluded that both Caravan of Courage and its sequel are fairy tales despite occurring in a science fiction setting. They point to magical phenomena in both films, which is a fantasy element. They argue that in a science fiction story, the hero wants to disrupt or challenge the hierarchy of a supposed "utopian" society; whereas in both Ewok films, society is not challenged or disputed. Additionally, they argue, that while the Star Wars saga also has fairy tale tropes, it adhered more towards science fiction. Another author agreed that the films are fairy tales, wherein "Science explains all magic."

Colin Greenland reviewed Caravan of Courage for Imagine magazine, and stated that "a casual catalogue of magical folderol about various ancestral talismans carried by the questing koalas. It certainly did the trick for the eight- and nine-year-olds in the front row, but seemed to make little sense to their mums and dads, or to me."

Modern reception has been largely negative, with Aidan Mason of Pop Culture Beast calling the movie, "a story without a sense of urgency" and "a chore to sit through".

On the review aggregator website Rotten Tomatoes, 39% of 66 critics' reviews are positive. The website's consensus reads: "Caravan of Courage: An Ewok Adventure struggles with wooden performances and a formulaic plot that fails to capture the charm and excitement of the larger Star Wars universe."

=== Accolades ===
The Ewok Adventure was one of four films to be juried-awarded Emmys for Outstanding Special Visual Effects at the 37th Primetime Emmy Awards. The film was additionally nominated for Outstanding Children's Program but lost in this category to an episode of American Playhouse.

== Legacy ==
Several elements from the film have gone on to appear in other works of the Star Wars Expanded Universe, which was declared non-canon and rebranded as Legends in 2014.

- Ewoks: The Battle for Endor (1985) is the second of the two made-for-TV Ewok films. It dealt with the orphanage of Cindel, after her family was killed by Sanyassan Marauders. The marauders also kidnap many of the Ewoks. After meeting and being taken in by Noa Briqualon, Cindel, along with the Ewoks, must team up to defeat the marauders and free the others from their grasp.
- Ewoks (1985–1987) is an ABC animated series featuring the Ewoks that ran for two seasons. Set before the original Star Wars trilogy, it features Izrina, Queen of the Wisties, in one episode, as well as Chukha-Trok and some of Wicket's family members.
- Tyrant's Test (1996) – In the Star Wars Legends continuity, Cindel Towani went on to appear in Tyrant's Test, the third book of Michael P. Kube-McDowell's Star Wars book series, The Black Fleet Crisis trilogy. In the novel, set over ten years after The Battle for Endor, Cindel is shown to have grown to become a reporter on Coruscant. During the Yevethan crisis, Cindel received the so-called Plat Mallar tapes from Admiral Drayson, and leaked the story of the only survivor of the Yevethan attack of Polneye. The report was meant to garner sympathy among the people of the New Republic and the Senate; it worked. The Expanded Universe claims Cindel decided to join the New Republic and go into journalism after witnessing the Battle of Endor.
- The Illustrated Star Wars Universe (1997) by Kevin J. Anderson retroactively set the film between the events of The Empire Strikes Back and Return of the Jedi.
- Star Wars Galaxies: An Empire Divided (2003) is an MMORPG. In the game, the player has the opportunity to encounter the Gorax species.

The Gorax was reintroduced to the Disney Star Wars canon in the second season episode "Traps and Tribulations" of the animated web series Star Wars: Forces of Destiny. Princess Leia Organa and Jedi Knight Luke Skywalker aid the Ewoks Kneesaa and Wicket against the rampaging beast.
