= A Guide to the Star Wars Universe =

A Guide to the Star Wars Universe, 1st Edition
- Author: Raymond L. Velasco
- Language: English
- Subject: Star Wars
- Genre: Science fiction
- Publisher: Del Rey
- Publication date: September 1, 1984
- Publication place: United States
- Media type: Paperback
- ISBN: 0-345-31920-6

A Guide to the Star Wars Universe is a reference book based on the Star Wars franchise published by Del Rey. The first edition was published in 1984 and written by Raymond L. Velasco. It is 215 pages long and contains roughly 951 entries. A second edition was published in 1994, written by Bill Slavicsek. It is 495 pages long, and the publisher's summary claims that it contains 50% new material. Slavicsek later also produced a third edition in 2000, which is 596 pages long and incorporates elements from Episode I: The Phantom Menace (1999).

The books alphabetically detail fictional people, places, things, and events in the Star Wars Expanded Universe. Most of the entries are quite short, with the longest being just over two pages. Each entry is divided into "G-canon" and "Expanded Universe" information, with media sources cited. The second edition also included a brief timeline, and a comparison of sublight speeds in starfighters.

Stephen J. Sansweet used the second edition as a primary reference for his Star Wars Encyclopedia (1998).
