= Ewok =

Fictional species in the Star Wars universe

Ewoks
- Star Wars race
- Wicket W. Warrick, a typical ewok, as seen in Return of the Jedi
- First appearance: Return of the Jedi (1983)

In-universe information
- Home world: Endor
- Distinctions: Furry, short stature
- Language: Ewokese

The Ewoks are a fictional species of small, furry, mammaloid bipeds in the Star Wars universe. They inhabit the forest moon of Endor and live in arboreal huts and other simple dwellings, being seen as primitive in comparison with other sentient species. Ewoks debuted in the 1983 feature film Return of the Jedi and have since appeared in two made-for-television films, The Ewok Adventure (1984) and Ewoks: The Battle for Endor (1985), as well as a 2D animated series, several books and games, and briefly in the 2019 feature film Star Wars: The Rise of Skywalker.

== Concept and creation ==
George Lucas created the Ewoks because he wanted Return of the Jedi to feature a tribe of primitive creatures that bring down the technological Empire. He had originally intended the scenes to be set on the Wookiee home planet, but as the film series evolved, the Wookiees became technologically skilled. Lucas reversed the syllables to designate a new species, which rhymes with the Miwok, a Native American tribe indigenous to the Redwood forest in which the Endor scenes were filmed for Return of the Jedi. He also based the Ewoks' defeat of the Galactic Empire on the actions of the Viet Cong guerrillas who fought against American soldiers during the Vietnam War.

A few different creatures, such as the stilt-legged Yuzzums, were proposed before the diminutive bear-like design of the Ewoks was settled on. As Wookiees were tall, Lucas wanted the new species short. Using the image of the Griffon Bruxellois, a dog breed which Lucas owned, the Ewok was developed by make-up artist Stuart Freeborn. As presented in the films, Ewoks appear as stocky, sapient bipeds which stand about one metre tall. They have flat faces, are completely covered in fur, and have large jewel-like eyes. Both their fur and their eyes come in a variety of earth tones, primarily brown, white, grey, gold, and black. Only the costume of the Ewok portrayed by Warwick Davis had moving facial features, though the 2011 Blu-ray release of Return of the Jedi added eye blinks to all of the Ewoks. Despite their small size, Ewoks are strong; in the climactic battle scene of the film, they are shown physically overpowering and once even throwing Imperial stormtroopers, though this detail is not consistent throughout the film. Ewoks live high among the trees of their home moon's forests, in villages built on platforms between the closely spaced trees.

=== Ewokese language ===
An Ewokese language was created for the films by Return of the Jedi's sound designer Ben Burtt. On the commentary track for the DVD of Return of the Jedi, Burtt explains that the language is based on Kalmyk, a Mongolic language spoken by the Kalmyk people of Russia. Burtt heard the language in a documentary and liked its sound, which seems very alien to Western ears. After some research, he identified an 80-year-old Kalmyk refugee, Kosi Unkov. Burtt recorded Unkov telling folk stories in her native language, and then used the recordings as a basis for sounds that became the Ewok language and were performed by voice actors Lama Kunga, Jr., Lama Kunger the Elder, M. K. Nepali, Khendup, and Dirty Daza, who imitated the old woman's voice in different styles. For the scene in which C-3PO speaks Ewokese, actor Anthony Daniels worked with Burtt and invented words, based on the Kalmyk recordings.

Separately, it has been reported that the speech of Ewoks in Return of the Jedi utilizes Nepalese and some sped-up Tibetan phrases, the latter including the phrase "there is lots of money here".

== Appearances ==
=== Return of the Jedi ===
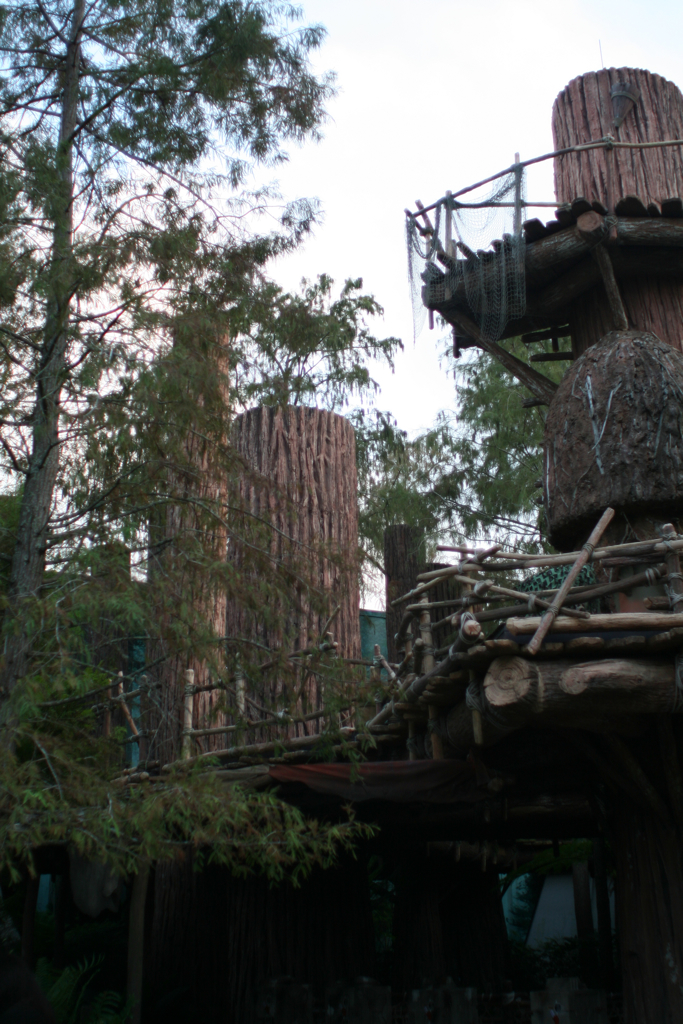
Ewok Village, Star Tours: The Adventures Continue at Walt Disney World in Florida

The Ewoks are involved in a large portion of the final installment in Lucasfilm's Star Wars trilogy. When the Empire begins operations on the moon of Endor, prior to the events depicted in the film, it ignores the primitive Ewoks. Princess Leia, part of a Rebel strike team, then befriends the Ewok Wicket W. Warrick, a scout from Bright Tree Village, and is taken to meet the other Ewoks. The Ewoks capture Han Solo, Chewbacca, Luke and the droids in a trap, and take them back to the village. As Ewoks are a carnivorous race that considers humanoid flesh a delicacy, they prepare fires in anticipation of eating Han, Luke and Chewbacca to absorb their power.

The Ewoks worship the protocol droid C-3PO, thinking he is a god due to his golden, metallic body and later display of power arranged by Luke Skywalker through the Force. C-3PO tells the Council of Elders the adventures of the rebel heroes Skywalker, Princess Leia, and Han Solo. The Ewoks accept the Rebels into their tribe and ally themselves to their cause. They then help in the ground battle to destroy the Imperial shield generator on the forest floor, and their primitive weapons fell the Imperial stormtroopers and the AT-ST walkers of the Empire. This assistance paves the way to victory at the Battle of Endor. Later that night, the Ewoks are shown holding a huge celebration.

Ewoks speak their native language of Ewokese, a fictional language created for the film. This language is understood by C-3PO, but not the humans in the film.

The word Ewok is not mentioned anywhere in the film, nor are any individuals referred to by name, except in the end titles, where names of the more prominent characters (Wicket, Paploo, Teebo, Logray and Chirpa) are shown, while the others are just listed as Ewoks.

=== The Rise of Skywalker ===
Wicket W. Warrick and another Ewok appear briefly at the end of The Rise of Skywalker.

=== Television films and animated series ===
Film	Release date	Director(s)	Screenwriter(s)	Story by	Network
The Ewok Adventure (Note: Retitled Caravan of Courage: An Ewok Adventure for its theatrical and later releases)	November 25, 1984	John Korty	Bob Carrau	George Lucas	ABC
Ewoks: The Battle for Endor	November 24, 1985	Jim Wheat and Ken Wheat	Jim Wheat and Ken Wheat	George Lucas	ABC

After the release of Return of the Jedi, the Ewoks starred in two made-for-TV movies, both of which starred Warwick Davis reprising his role as Wicket from Return of the Jedi. The first film, The Ewok Adventure, was released in November 1984, followed by Ewoks: The Battle for Endor the next year. The Ewoks also starred in cartoon series on ABC known simply as Ewoks. Their rival species in the series, the Duloks, are explained by official sources to be distant cousins of the Ewoks.

A teddy bear-like Ewok doll appears in the animated series Star Wars Resistance.

=== Comics ===
The Ewoks animated series had a comic book series, one issue of which crosses over with the comic for Ewoks' sister animated series, Droids.

In a (non-canon) Star Wars Tales comic entitled Apocalypse Endor, an Imperial veteran of Endor refers to the moon being devastated by the impact of falling debris from the Death Star, which was blown up while in orbit around the moon, causing devastation to the Ewoks. However, another character dismisses this as a myth, saying that most of the Death Star's mass was obliterated in the explosion, and that the Rebels "took care of the rest".

A canon Ewoks-themed comic spun off from Return of the Jedi was scheduled for release in April 2023.

== Reception ==
The Ewoks are seen to be a controversial element of Return of the Jedi and the Star Wars universe in general, and are seen by some to be the weakest part of the original trilogy. According to Tami Katzoff of MTV News, "a prevailing theory among Ewok-haters is that the creatures were originally conceived as a sure way to appeal to small children and sell plush toys to their parents." Others enjoy the Ewoks, and they have proven to be very popular with children from their introduction in 1983 to the present day.

Film	Rotten Tomatoes	Metacritic
Return of the Jedi	82% (93 reviews)	58 (24 reviews)
The Ewok Adventure	23% (13 reviews)	—N/a

=== Emmy Awards ===
Caravan of Courage: An Ewok Adventure was one of four films to be juried-awarded Emmys for Outstanding Special Visual Effects at the 37th Primetime Emmy Awards. The film was additionally nominated for Outstanding Children's Program, but lost in this category to an episode of American Playhouse.

At the 38th Primetime Emmy Awards, Ewoks: The Battle for Endor and the CBS documentary Dinosaur! were both juried-awarded Emmys for Outstanding Special Visual Effects. The film additionally received two nominations for Outstanding Children's Program and Outstanding Sound Mixing for a Miniseries or a Special.

== Notable Ewoks ==
Several Ewoks have received a higher level of definition and recognition in Star Wars media.

=== Wicket ===
Wicket is the most prominently featured Ewok in Return of The Jedi. During his travels, he encounters Princess Leia in the forest. He helps her to the relative safety of his village, and notices her courage and compassion. Wicket has good knowledge of the terrain of Endor, leading him to be essential during the Rebellion's attack on the Imperial forces.

Wicket was portrayed by actor Warwick Davis. The then 11-year-old actor came to be involved in the film after his grandmother heard a radio ad calling for short actors. Davis began work on the film in January 1982. Originally cast as a generic Ewok, Davis caught the eye of George Lucas with aspects of his performance, such as his ability to stick his tongue through his Ewok mask and the inquisitive tilting of his head (which was inspired by Davis' dog). Kenny Baker (who also portrayed R2-D2) was originally set to take the role of Wicket; however, Baker fell ill with food poisoning, and Davis was called in as a replacement. Wicket's voice was provided by Adeal Crooms.

Wicket appears in the micro-series Star Wars Forces of Destiny. He also features in The Ewok Adventure, Ewoks, and Ewoks: The Battle for Endor.

=== Teebo ===
Teebo is described by the Star Wars: The Complete Visual Dictionary as being 'A watcher of the stars and a poet at heart.' His ability to make a sound practical judgement has caused him to have a position as a leader within the tribe. He wears a Gurreck skull headdress. Teebo was portrayed by Jack Purvis.

=== Chief Chirpa ===
Chief Chirpa has been the leader of the Ewok tribe for a total of 42 seasons. He has a large amount of wisdom and good judgement, but he has become forgetful due to his old age. He allows the Ewok tribe the authority to fight against the Empire. Chief Chirpa has a medallion signifying he is the chief of the Ewoks. Chirpa was played by Jane Busby.

=== Logray ===
Logray is the Ewok tribal shaman, who relies on ancient magic in order to assist his tribe. He is suspicious of all outsiders, which is reinforced due to the arrival of Imperial troops. Logray was portrayed by Mike Edmonds, who also was the "tail-puppeteer" for Jabba the Hutt.

=== Paploo ===
Paploo is Chief Chirpa's nephew and a scout who, along with Wicket, helps lead the Rebels to the shield generator protecting the second Death Star. Although his effort to lure four Imperial scouts away from the bunker could have compromised the attack, it was relatively successful as he stole a speeder bike and forced three of the scouts to give chase, allowing the rebels to overpower the last guard and gain entrance. Paploo is seen later helping the Ewoks fight the Empire.

=== Nippet ===
Nippet is a baby Ewok who gets her name in the vintage era. Nippet is the daughter of Lumat.

=== Lumat ===
Lumat is the chief woodcutter of the tribe, and is the father of Nippet.

== See also ==
- List of Star Wars planets and moons
- drop bear
- teddy bear
