= Ewoks: The Battle for Endor =

1985 TV movie directed by Ken Wheat

- Promotional release poster
- Genre: Adventure; Family; Dark fantasy; Science fiction
- Screenplay by: Ken and Jim Wheat
- Story by: George Lucas
- Directed by: Ken and Jim Wheat
- Starring: Wilford Brimley; Warwick Davis; Aubree Miller; Paul Gleason; Carel Struycken; Niki Botelho; Eric Walker; Siân Phillips
- Music by: Peter Bernstein (Note: Original Star Wars themes by John Williams)
- Country of origin: United States
- Original language: English

Production
- Executive producer: George Lucas
- Producer: Thomas G. Smith
- Cinematography: Isidore Mankofsky
- Editor: Eric Jenkins
- Running time: 94 minutes
- Production company: Lucasfilm

Original release
- Network: ABC
- Release: November 24, 1985

Related
- Caravan of Courage: An Ewok Adventure

Ewoks: The Battle for Endor is a 1985 American television film set in the Star Wars universe. It was written and directed by Ken and Jim Wheat from a story by George Lucas. A sequel to Caravan of Courage: An Ewok Adventure, it focuses on Cindel Towani, the human girl from the first film, who, after being orphaned, joins the Ewoks in protecting their village and defeating the marauders who have taken control of the Endor moon. The film premiered on ABC on November 24, 1985.

== Plot ==
Nearly six months have passed since the events of the first film; the Towani family's star cruiser is almost completely fixed and Jeremitt is putting the final touches on the craft. While the family is preparing to leave the forest moon of Endor, the Ewok village is attacked by a Marauder group led by Terak and his witch-like sorceress Charal. Many Ewoks are captured, while Jeremitt, Catarine, and Mace are killed helping to defend the Ewok village. The marauders steal a power cell from the Towani's star cruiser believing it to have some sort of magic power over the stars.

While running away from the marauders, Cindel and Wicket meet Teek, a small, fast native of Endor. Teek takes them to the home of Noa Briqualon, a human male who is angered by their uninvited presence and throws them out. Eventually he proves himself to be kindhearted, letting Teek steal food for Cindel and Wicket, and inviting the two in when they attempt to build a fire for warmth outside.

At the Marauders' castle, Terak orders Charal to find Cindel, assuming she knows how to use "the power" in the energy cell stolen from Jeremitt's star cruiser. Meanwhile, Noa, Cindel, Wicket, and Teek are becoming friends. It is revealed that Noa is rebuilding his own wrecked star cruiser, only missing the energy cell, originally landing with a friend of his named Salak who disappeared while searching for another cell. Cindel is awakened one morning by a song her mother used to sing. She follows the voice to find a woman singing, who transforms into Charal and takes her to Terak. He orders Cindel to activate "the power", but she cannot, and is imprisoned with the Ewoks where it is revealed Salak was killed after telling Terak about "the power". Outside, Noa, Wicket, and Teek sneak into the castle, free Cindel and the Ewoks, and escape with the energy cell.

Terak, Charal, and the Marauders pursue them back to the ship, where Wicket leads the Ewoks in defense of the cruiser as Noa installs the energy cell. The Ewoks put up a valiant effort, and are nearly beaten by the time Noa powers up the ship and uses its laser cannons to fend off the Marauders. Cindel goes to save Wicket and is captured by Terak, as the other Marauders retreat. Terak and Noa face off, with Wicket finally coming to the rescue, killing Terak and simultaneously leaving Charal trapped in bird form. Shortly thereafter, goodbyes are said, and Cindel leaves Endor with Noa on his starship.

== Cast ==
- Warwick Davis as Wicket W. Warrick
- Aubree Miller as Cindel Towani
- Wilford Brimley as Noa Briqualon
- Carel Struycken as Terak
- Siân Phillips as Charal
  - Marianne Horine as Young Witch
- Niki Botelho as Teek
- Paul Gleason as Jeremitt Towani
- Eric Walker as Mace Towani
- Daniel Frishman as Deej Warrick
- Tony Cox as Widdle "Willy" Warrick
- Pam Grizz as Shodu Warrick
- Roger Johnson as Lieutenant
- Michael Pritchard as Card Player #1
- Johnny Weissmuller Jr. as Card Player #2
- Matthew Roloff as Ewok with Crutches

== Production ==
=== Creation and crew ===
The film, shot in the middle of 1985 in Marin County, California, was directed by Ken and Jim Wheat, executive produced by Lucas, and written by the Wheat brothers, based on a story written by Lucas. Co-director Ken Wheat explained the production and inspiration of the film:

Lucas guided the creation of the story over the course of two four-hour sessions we had with him. He'd just watched Heidi with his daughter the weekend before these took place, and the story idea he pushed was having the little girl from the first Ewok TV movie become an orphan who ends up living with a grumpy old hermit in the woods. We'd been thinking about the adventure films we'd liked as kids, like Swiss Family Robinson and The Seventh Voyage of Sinbad, so we suggested having space marauders, which was fine with George — as long as they were 7 feet tall, of course! The rest of the brainstorming was done along those lines. Joe Johnston (the production designer and second unit director) and Phil Tippett (the creature supervisor) were involved in the second day's story session, and they contributed an assortment of bits and pieces.

Lucas' involvement during production was primarily in the design and editing stages, according to Wheat. The film's working title was Ewoks II.

Wilford Brimley did not get along with the Wheats, so his scenes were directed by Johnston.

=== Effects ===
Both Ewok films were some of the last intensive stop-motion animation work Industrial Light & Magic produced, as in the early 1980s, the technique was being replaced by go motion animation, a more advanced form with motorized articulated puppets that moved while the camera shutter was open, capturing motion blur in the otherwise static puppet, eliminating the harsh staccato movement often associated with stop motion. However, the budgets of the Ewok films were such that go motion was simply too expensive for the projects, so stop motion was used to realize creatures such as the condor dragon, the blurrgs, and the boar-wolves.

The Ewok movies proved an opportunity for Industrial Light & Magic to hone a new technique in photographing matte paintings, called latent image matte painting. In this technique, during live action photography a section of the camera's lens is blocked off, remaining unexposed, and a painting is crafted to occupy that space. The film would then be rewound, the blocked areas reversed, and the painting photographed. Since the painting now existed on the original film, there would be no generational quality loss.

=== Music ===
The musical score for Ewoks: The Battle for Endor was composed by Peter Bernstein. Selections from the score were released on LP by Varèse Sarabande in 1986. The release was known simply as Ewoks, and also contained cues from Bernstein's previous score to The Ewok Adventure.

== Alternate versions ==
- In a home video release, the following two scenes were deleted: when being chased by Terak's men, Wicket races for Noa's house but Noa tells him the only chance they have got is the star cruiser. Then a scene that happened shortly after where the men went inside and burned down Noa's house.
- When Cindel has a nightmare about bad men coming into Noa's house, a scene was cut from the television broadcast, in which Cindel rushes to Noa's bed to wake him up, but instead finds Terak in the bed and wakes up. The television version just shows Cindel waking up after the men break in.
- Cindel's lines: "Do something, Wicket! Use your sling! You hit the ring!" have been altered to "Do something, Wicket! Do something!" for the DVD release.
- In the original TV broadcast of the film, the end credits were rolled over the final scene, but in all home-video releases of the film, the end credits are rolled over a traditional black background after the final scene.

== Adaptations ==
In 1986, Random House published a children's book adaptation of The Battle for Endor called The Ring, the Witch, and the Crystal: An Ewok Adventure. The book was written by Cathy East Dubowski, and utilized the film's storyline and imagery.

== Release ==
Ewoks: The Battle for Endor initially premiered as an ABC TV special on November 24, 1985. It was given a limited international theatrical release in 1986. After the run had disappeared due to low box office receipts, it appeared on home video in late 1987 on MGM/UA and re-issued for retail in 1988 and 1990. The U.S. later released on VHS and Laserdisc in 1990 through MGM/UA Home Video.

The film was released on DVD with its predecessor as a double-feature collection entitled Star Wars: Ewok Adventures on November 23, 2004, via 20th Century Fox Home Entertainment. One film was on each side of a single double-sided disc, with no bonus material.

In January 2019, Disney and Lucasfilm released The Battle for Endor on Amazon Prime Video, where it was available to rent or buy in standard definition. As of December 2019, the film was no longer available through that service.

Prior to 2021, Disney announced no plans to add the Ewok films to its streaming service, Disney+. This prompted Eric Walker to start a petition for Disney to add them. In March 2021, it was announced that both films would begin streaming on Disney+ on April 2, 2021.

== Reception ==
At the 38th Primetime Emmy Awards, Ewoks: The Battle for Endor and the CBS documentary Dinosaur! were both juried-awarded Emmys for Outstanding Special Visual Effects. The film additionally received two nominations for Outstanding Children's Program and Outstanding Sound Mixing for a Miniseries or a Special.

In his review for The New York Times John Corry faulted the production's source of inspiration, saying "The problem with Ewoks: The Battle for Endor isn't that it's badly done; on the contrary, it's wonderfully well done. But when it's over it's over, and there is no residue. Mr. Lucas and his colleagues find their inspiration in their own technology, and there should be other places to look."

Aidan Mason of Pop Culture Beast stated the film, "manages to improve on the original" and felt much more like a Star Wars film, although he was still critical of the acting.

On the review aggregator website Rotten Tomatoes, 64% of 33 critics' reviews are positive. The website's consensus reads: "Despite some slow pacing and uneven performances, Ewoks: The Battle for Endor finds balance in The Force with its combination of imaginative visuals and charmingly simplistic storytelling."

== Legacy ==
Several elements from the film have gone on to appear in other works of the Star Wars Expanded Universe, which was declared non-canon and rebranded as Legends in 2014.

- Ewoks (1985–1987) was an ABC animated series featuring the Ewoks that ran for two seasons; it was retroactively set before the original Star Wars trilogy.
- Tyrant's Test (1996) - In the Star Wars Legends continuity, Cindel Towani went on to appear in Tyrant's Test, the third book of Michael P. Kube-McDowell's Star Wars book series, The Black Fleet Crisis trilogy. In the novel, set over ten years after The Battle for Endor, Cindel is shown to have grown to become a reporter on Coruscant. During the Yevethan crisis, Cindel received the so-called Plat Mallar tapes from Admiral Drayson, and leaked the story of the only survivor of the Yevethan attack of Polneye. The report was meant to garner sympathy among the people of the New Republic and the Senate and it worked. The Expanded Universe timeline states Cindel decided to join the New Republic and go into journalism after witnessing the Battle of Endor.
- The Illustrated Star Wars Universe (1997) by Kevin J. Anderson retroactively set the film between the events of The Empire Strikes Back and Return of the Jedi, and explained that Charal was a Force-sensitive witch from the planet Dathomir.
- HoloNet issue #49 (2002) was an issue of the in-universe news report. In the "regional" section of this issue, the article "Moddell Starship Search Abandoned", explains that the search has been called off for the rescue of Salek Weet and Noa Briqualon, which had been funded by Salek's father, Jimke Weet. The search was said to have been called off due to the fact that Jimke had to file bankruptcy due to his expenses in the search.
- Star Wars Galaxies: An Empire Divided (2003) is a MMORPG. In the game, when exploring the forest moon of Endor, the player can run across the base of the Sanyassan Marauders.
- Geonosis and the Outer Rim Worlds (2004) was a sourcebook for the Star Wars: The Roleplaying Game. In it, Terak's son Zakul takes over rule of his Marauders after Terak's death. The book gives Terak's bio and stats. It explains his death, and the rise of his son, Zakul.

Canon appearances of elements introduced in the film include:

- Blurrgs appear in the animated TV series Star Wars: The Clone Wars (2008) and the streaming series The Mandalorian, the latter of which is the first live-action Star Wars television project since The Battle for Endor.
- Teek appears in one episode of the 2024 Disney+ live-action series, Star Wars: Skeleton Crew, which takes place during the time frame as The Mandalorian series and shortly after the events of Return of the Jedi and the series itself is something of a Spiritual Successor of both TV films.
