= Reactions to the death of Elizabeth II =

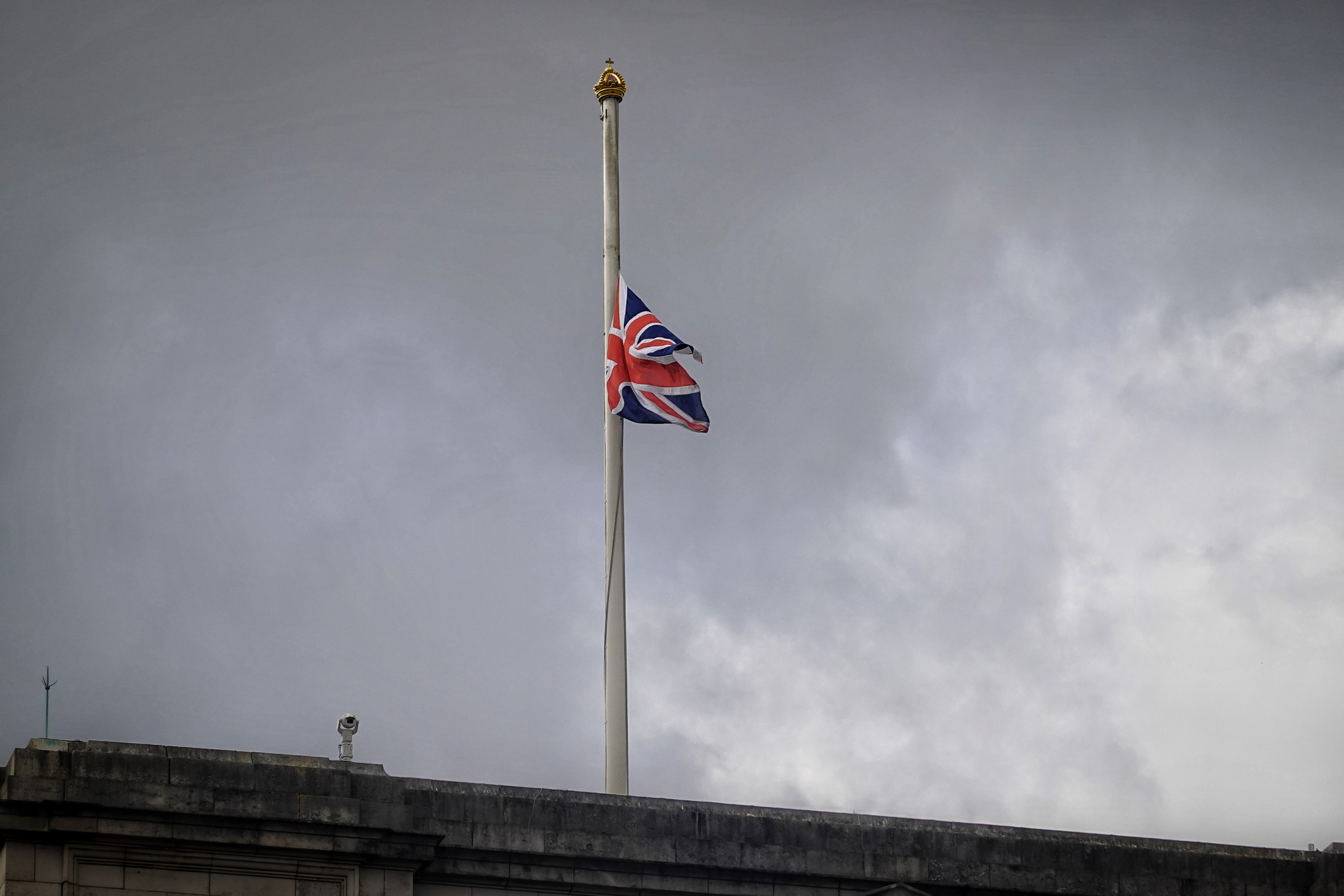
The Union Flag over Buckingham Palace at half-mast following the death of Queen Elizabeth II.

Elizabeth II, Queen of the United Kingdom and the other Commonwealth realms, died on 8 September 2022, leading to reactions from around the world. The new king, Charles III, paid tribute to his "darling Mama" in an address to the nation and Commonwealth the next day. Politicians throughout the Commonwealth paid tribute to the Queen, praising her long public service. Political figures of the rest of the world also offered their condolences and tributes, as did members of royal families, religious leaders and other public figures.

Commemorations were observed at many global landmarks, with some lit up in the colours of the Union Jack or illuminating an image of Elizabeth. Many organisations paid their respects, and some suspended operations or cancelled events. BBC, ITV, Channel 4 and Channel 5 all interrupted television programming to cover the news, while print media dedicated entire front covers in tribute.

The wider public also reacted on social media, many sending condolences to the royal family or thanking the Queen for her work. Others debated the legacy of the British Empire and the abolition of the monarchy.

== Royal family ==
"She's got those wonderful blue eyes... when she smiles they light up her whole face. I will always remember that smile. You know, that smile is unforgettable."

— Queen Camilla paying tribute to Queen Elizabeth II.

King Charles III, successor to Elizabeth II, released a statement immediately following his mother's death.

Charles gave his first address to the nation and Commonwealth on 9 September at 6 p.m. BST, in which he mourned, paid tribute, and proclaimed his son William the Prince of Wales. The Queen's three younger children, Anne, Andrew, and Edward, published statements of their own. Charles, along with Anne and Edward, participated in the BBC One special programme A Tribute to Her Majesty The Queen.

Four of the Queen's grandchildren, William, Harry, Beatrice, and Eugenie, paid tribute to their grandmother via their own statements.

== Political ==
=== United Kingdom ===
- Prime Minister of the United Kingdom Liz Truss, delivered a live televised address to the nation regarding the Queen's death from outside 10 Downing Street, calling her "the rock on which modern Britain was built".
  - Former Prime Minister Sir John Major said: "For 70 years Her Majesty The Queen devoted her life to the service of our nation and its wellbeing. In her public duties she was selfless and wise, with a wonderful generosity of spirit. That is how she lived – and how she led. For millions of people – across the Commonwealth and the wider world – she embodied the heart and soul of our nation, and was admired and respected around the globe."
  - Former Prime Minister Sir Tony Blair said: "We have lost not just our monarch but the matriarch of our nation, the figure who more than any other brought our country together, kept us in touch with our better nature, personified everything which makes us proud to be British."
  - Former Prime Minister Gordon Brown said: "The United Kingdom, the Commonwealth, and the entire world are joined together in mourning this evening. HM Queen Elizabeth II served this country to the last. I offer my sincere condolences to the Royal Family. May she rest in peace."
  - Former Prime Minister David Cameron said: "At this solemn and profoundly sad time for our country, the Commonwealth and the world, I offer His Majesty The King and the whole Royal Family, my heartfelt condolences on the death of Queen Elizabeth II."
  - Former Prime Minister Theresa May said the Queen was "the most impressive head of state" that she had met during her time in office. She also issued a statement, in which she said: "Her Majesty witnessed tremendous change, moving adroitly with the times but always providing stability and reassurance. She was our constant throughout this great Elizabethan era. It was the honour of my life to serve her as prime minister. ... Our thoughts and prayers now are with her family. God Save The King."
  - Former Prime Minister Boris Johnson said: "This is our country's saddest day. In the hearts of every one of us there is an ache at the passing of our Queen, a deep and personal sense of loss – far more intense, perhaps, than we expected. As is so natural with human beings, it is only when we face the reality of our loss that we truly understand what has gone. Though our voices may still be choked with sadness we can say with confidence the words not heard in this country for more than seven decades. God Save The King."

==== Devolved governments ====
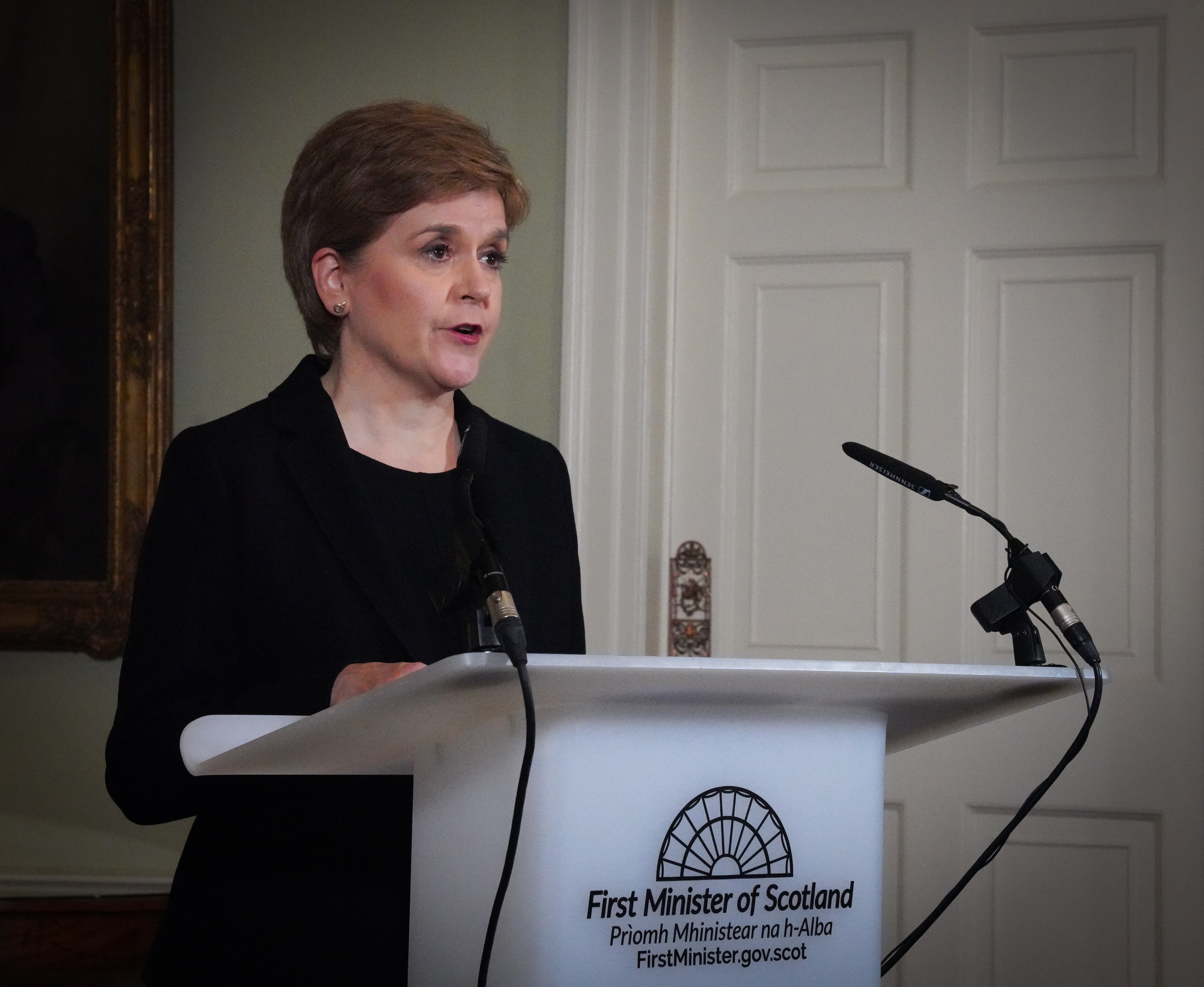
Statement made by the First Minister of Scotland Nicola Sturgeon from Bute House in tribute to Her Majesty The Queen, 8 September

- Scotland's first minister Nicola Sturgeon tweeted: "The death of Her Majesty, Queen Elizabeth is a profoundly sad moment for the UK, the Commonwealth and the world. Her life was one of extraordinary dedication and service. On behalf of the people of Scotland, I convey my deepest condolences to The King and the Royal Family."
  - Former first minister of Scotland and Alba Party leader Alex Salmond released a statement on the party's website paying tribute to the Queen, calling her death "a great moment of sadness for her family and for people around the world."
    - Scottish Alba Party general secretary Chris McEleny said there was "no place" for King Charles in an independent Scotland after the end of the Queen's reign.
- First Minister of Wales Mark Drakeford said that it was "incredibly sad" to hear of the death of the Queen, and "On behalf of the people of Wales I offer our deepest condolences to Her Majesty's family during this sad time". In a statement Drakeford added "Her Majesty has reigned over the United Kingdom and Commonwealth firmly upholding the values and traditions of the British Monarchy."
- Northern Ireland First Minister-designate Michelle O'Neill said "Personally, I am grateful for Queen Elizabeth's significant contribution and determined efforts to advancing peace and reconciliation between our two islands. Throughout the peace process she led by example in building relationships with those of us who are Irish, and who share a different political allegiance and aspirations to herself and her government."
  - Leader of the Democratic Unionist Party Jeffrey Donaldson said: "This is just the saddest news and our hearts are breaking. "Her Majesty The Queen was a wonderful lady and I had the privilege of meeting her many times including here at Hillsborough Castle. "People right across Northern Ireland tonight will be deeply sorrowful for the loss of this marvellous, wonderful Queen. "There is no doubt Her Majesty The Queen played a very important role in helping to build reconciliation. Her visit to Dublin was a cathartic moment in the history of British-Irish relations."

==== Crown dependencies ====
- Chief minister of the Isle of Man Alfred Cannan paid tribute, saying: "We are all deeply saddened to learn of the death of Her Majesty The Queen. Throughout her long reign, The Queen – our Lord of Mann – has been a beacon of strength and stability, of dependability and continuity. She led a life dedicated to the service of her people, setting an example for us all. On behalf of the Government and people of the Isle of Man, I extend my sincerest condolences to the Royal Family at this sad time."
- Lieutenant Governor of Guernsey Richard Cripwell said: "I served Her Majesty Queen Elizabeth II in the Army for more than 40 years and it has been my honour and privilege to be Her personal representative in the Bailiwick since February 2022. It was my most sad and solemn duty to receive official notification of the passing of Her Majesty and to convey it to others in the Bailiwick. Even in this time of great sadness, I know that everyone in the Bailiwick will always remember Her Majesty's exceptional devotion to Her people, Her extraordinary service to those She represented and Her love of these Islands."
  - Bailiff of Guernsey Richard McMahon also said: "Like others across the Bailiwick and throughout the world, I feel a profound sense of loss. Her Majesty offered an example to us all in her enduringly strong sense of duty and public service. She was an important figurehead for the UK, for the Bailiwick of Guernsey and for many other parts of the world throughout her reign. On behalf of the people of Guernsey, I have asked His Excellency the Lieutenant-Governor to send the Bailiwick's official condolence message to Buckingham Palace."
  - President of the Policy and Resources Committee of Guernsey Deputy Peter Ferbrache also said: "Like many in our community, for as long as I can remember Her Majesty Queen Elizabeth II was the sovereign. As the longest reigning monarch in British history, she represented continuity, constancy and commitment to people in the Bailiwick and around the globe. It is sad, strange and unsettling to hear that Her Majesty is now lost to us."
- : Bailiff and acting lieutenant governor of Jersey, Sir Timothy Le Cocq, issued the following statement: "I know that islanders will be deeply saddened, as am I, at the news from Buckingham Palace of the death of Her Majesty the Queen. It is almost impossible to overstate her importance in the life of the nation and all her dominions in the 70 years of Her reign. She has been an example of duty discharged and promises kept, and she has worked tirelessly over the decades for the wellbeing of all her peoples and of the Commonwealth. There will be time in the days and weeks to come, to reflect on all of that but today we can only feel the sadness, of the loss of a person who has been a constant presence in our lives, and who is held in this island in such great esteem and affection. We should also remember that this is also a private time of grief for the Royal Family and our thoughts and prayers are with them now as they come to terms with the loss of a mother and grandmother."

==== Overseas territories ====
- Edward David Burt, Premier of Bermuda, said: "The recognition of her longevity and the significance of her service affords this consequential reign a unique place in history. Beyond the role which the Queen fulfilled for these 70 years within the UK and the Commonwealth, she was a mother, grandmother and great-grandmother and her family is now mourning that loss. On behalf of the Government and people of Bermuda, I express sincere condolences to the Royal Family and the people of the United Kingdom."
- John Rankin, Governor of the Virgin Islands, said in a speech: "I know the people of the British Virgin Islands will be deeply saddened by this news and will join me in a period of mourning for Her Majesty The Queen. Our thoughts are with the Royal Family at this difficult time."
- Martyn Roper, Governor of the Cayman Islands, said: "She has been an inspirational role model and given outstanding service throughout our lives. She is the only Monarch that very many of us have ever known. Her loss will be keenly felt. She is unlike any other Monarch in history." A period of 10-day was designated for national mourning with the funeral to be a public holiday. Flags for most part were told to be flown at half mast.
- Sir David Steel, Governor of Gibraltar, issued a statement: "Across the world, not just within every nation of the Commonwealth, people will mourn her passing. She has been a beacon of fortitude, hope and kindness. Despite our great sadness, we can reflect on how blessed we have been to live during the time of a monarch who has cared deeply for everyone, collectively and individually, who has shown amazing courage at the darkest of times, and who has instilled in all of us hope for the future."
  - Chief Minister of Gibraltar Fabian Picardo remarked, "The People of Gibraltar will mourn Her Majesty as a monarch who has reigned wisely and with incomparable dedication throughout the period of our post-war emergence as a part of the British family of nations."
- Roger Spink, Chair of the Legislative Assembly of the Falkland Islands, expressed: "On behalf of the people of the Falkland Islands, we wish to express our heartfelt sympathies to the Royal family at this sorrowful time. We have a deep and lasting affection for Her Majesty The Queen, who on her twenty-first birthday declared 'that my whole life whether it be long or short shall be devoted to your service'. Her Majesty did devote her life to the service of her country and the Falkland Islands were devoted to The Queen engaging with many of her celebrations."
- Easton Taylor-Farrell, Premier of Montserrat, said: "We are all deeply saddened to learn of the Queen's passing. During her seventy-year reign as Queen of the Commonwealth, Her Majesty has been a source of strength and inspiration to all within her realms. Today is indeed a sad day for all of us as we mourn her passing."
- Nigel Dakin, Governor of the Turks and Caicos Islands, said: "Her late Majesty epitomised the notion of service. It is hard for me to express my own personal sorrow at her passing let alone capture, properly, the thoughts of the people of the Turks and Caicos Islands but I can try. She was a truly great Monarch, the longest serving we have ever had."

=== Australia ===
==== Federal ====
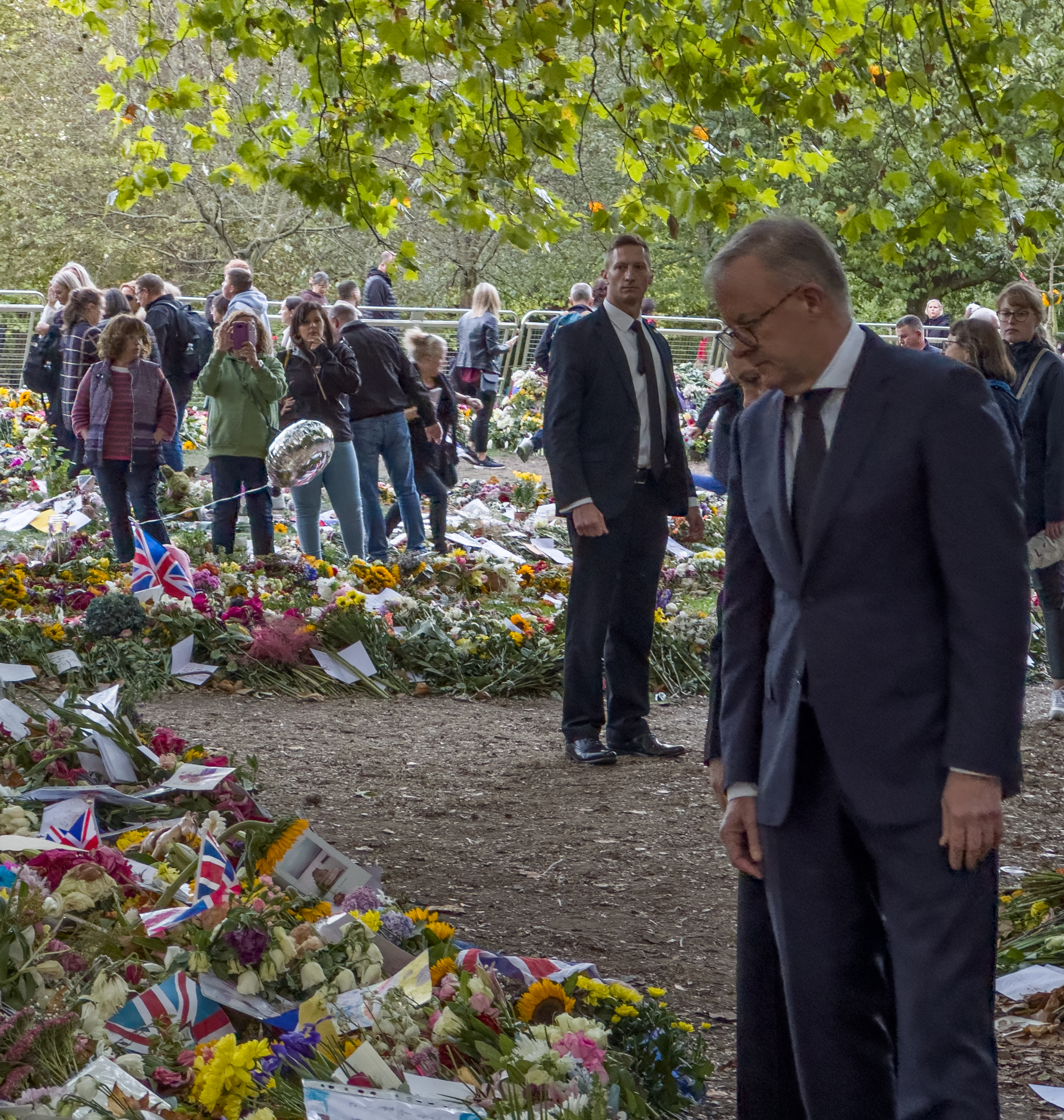
Australian prime minister Anthony Albanese looking at floral tributes left in Green Park, London

- In an address to the nation, Australian Prime Minister Anthony Albanese said that the Queen's death was a "deep loss for Australians". He recalled Queen Elizabeth II as "a person who went through a lot of noise and turbulence, but still showed modesty and eternal calm." He also described the monarch as "a rare and reassuring constant amidst rapid change" and said that her "dedication to duty and service over self were the hallmarks of her reign". Flags were flown at half-mast across the country. As the long-running republican debate was revived by some politicians within hours of the death being announced, Albanese told Radio National "today's not the day for politics". On 11 September, the Prime Minister declared a "one-off" national public holiday for Thursday, 22 September, "to allow people to pay their respects for the passing of Queen Elizabeth". Protests to "abolish the monarchy" were held in several capital cities on that holiday.
  - Governor-General David Hurley said: "When I reflect on my own memories – she was my Queen for my whole life – I think of Her Majesty's dignity and her compassion. Her dedication and tireless work ethic. And her selflessness and unwavering commitment to the people that she served. To us. Her death will sadden all Australians and will be felt around the world."
  - Former Prime Minister Paul Keating said: "She was an exemplar of public leadership, married for a lifetime to political restraint, remaining always, the constitutional monarch... Her exceptionally long, dedicated reign is unlikely to be repeated; not only in Britain, but in the world generally. With her passing her example of public service remains with us as a lesson in dedication to a lifelong mission in what she saw as the value of what is both enduringly good and right."
  - Former Prime Minister John Howard said: "Whatever our views are about constitutional arrangements, and everybody knows mine, should take pause to honour this incredible life... my own dealings with her are ones that I remember with great affection. She had a great sense of humour."
  - Former Prime Minister Kevin Rudd posted a tribute to the Queen in a Facebook post, saying: "For most of us, the Queen's presence has been a constant fixture in our lives. She will be remembered not only for the longevity of her reign, but also for her steadfastness, her sense of duty and her devotion to family... whether republicans or monarchists, Australians will be deeply affected by this news."
  - Former Prime Minister Julia Gillard said: "The Queen has been a powerful presence for as long as many of us can remember. She was a remarkable role model; responsibility for service thrust onto her as a young woman, and taken up with grace, devotion and dignity during her reign. The Queen will be remembered as a monarch who witnessed – and influenced – the trajectory of modern history."
  - Former Prime Minister Tony Abbott said: "Probably not a single death in human history will be as widely felt as that of Queen Elizabeth II... almost no one alive today can remember a world without the Queen. That's why her passing will leave billions of people feeling numb, certainly all those in the English-speaking countries and the wider Commonwealth for whom the monarchy matters most."
  - Former Prime Minister Malcolm Turnbull said: "Today we are united in grief as we mourn the death of Queen Elizabeth. Her long life of service inspired the whole world and was a calm and gracious presence through seven decades of turbulence and change. Farewell Your Majesty. Rest In Peace."
  - Former Prime Minister Scott Morrison posted a tribute to the Queen in a Facebook post, saying: "The passing of Her Majesty, Queen Elizabeth II brings to a close an extraordinary and historic reign of grace, strength, dignity and duty. Her Majesty was the rock of the Commonwealth and for so many a rock in their own lives, whose constancy enabled them to carry on. Over the course of her long reign she lived with a deep passion, warmth, interest and kind fondness to all of the nations and peoples she served as our Majesty and who had the great fortune to call her their Queen, especially Australia."
  - Former Treasurer Josh Frydenberg tweeted: "Deeply saddened by the passing of Queen Elizabeth II. A remarkable individual whose life epitomised dignity, grace and service beyond self. Her very presence provided stability and strength. It is the end of an era but the Queen's life will always be admired and never forgotten."
  - Opposition Leader Peter Dutton said: "Never in modern history has there been a more dignified monarch, a more dutiful leader, or a more decent human than Her Majesty Queen Elizabeth II. An extraordinary life which touched so many has sadly come to an end."
  - Australian Greens leader and federal MP Adam Bandt, along with Australian senator Mehreen Faruqi expressed sympathy for those mourning the Queen's death, however called for Australia to become a republic, Faruqi criticised the Queen, saying she led a "racist empire", which in turn received heavy backlash.

==== States and territories ====
- State and territory leaders, governors and administrators have released tributes to the Queen through media releases:
  - New South Wales: premier, governor
  - Victoria: premier, governor
  - Queensland: premier, governor
  - Western Australian: Premier, Governor
  - South Australia: premier, governor
  - Tasmania: premier, governor
  - ACT: chief minister, governor-general
  - Northern Territory: chief minister, Administrator
  - Australian Indian Ocean Territories: administrator
  - Norfolk Island: administrator

=== Canada ===
- Canadian Prime Minister Justin Trudeau issued a statement on Twitter offering his condolences for the Queen's death. He later made additional comments at a cabinet retreat in Vancouver stating that she had been one of his favourite people and that all of Canada was in mourning.
  - Governor General of Canada Mary Simon wrote "... Her Majesty The Queen was, in equal measures, compassionate, dedicated, humble, engaged and wise. She believed in service to her people above all, and inspired so many with her dedication to the Crown ... For many of us, we have only ever known one Queen ... Her Majesty's warm welcome when we spent time with her earlier this year was a profound moment in our lives and a memory we will cherish forever."
  - Leader of the Official Opposition Candice Bergen issued a statement on Twitter and the Conservative Party's website sharing her condolences with the Queen's family and wishing King Charles III a long reign: "As a proud Commonwealth country, we grieve with unspeakable sadness the loss of our longest-reigning monarch. Her Majesty's sense of duty to Canada was both deeply held and demonstrated in her actions. As Queen of Canada, she was not only a witness to our historical evolution as a modern, confident, and self-assured nation – she was an active participant."
  - 19 September, the date of the funeral for Queen Elizabeth II, was a national holiday and national day of mourning in Canada as announced by Prime Minister Justin Trudeau, coinciding with the national holiday declared in the United Kingdom.

==== Provinces ====
- Alberta: lieutenant governor, premier, and speaker.
- British Columbia: lieutenant governor, premier
- Manitoba: lieutenant governor, premier
- New Brunswick: lieutenant governor, premier
- Newfoundland and Labrador: lieutenant governor, premier
- Nova Scotia: lieutenant governor, Premier
- Ontario: lieutenant governor, premier
- Prince Edward Island: lieutenant governor, premier
- Quebec: lieutenant governor, leaders
- Saskatchewan: lieutenant governor, premier

==== Territories ====
- NWT: Premier
- Nunavut: Premier
- Yukon: Commissioner, Premier

=== New Zealand ===
- New Zealand Prime Minister Jacinda Ardern was saddened upon learning Queen Elizabeth's death. According to her, "Young or old, there is no doubt that this is a closing chapter. We thank you for this amazing woman, who we are lucky enough to call Queen. She's been amazing." In addition, Ardern acknowledged the Queen as "extraordinary", an "incredible woman" and a "constant in our lives". "I know that I speak for people across New Zealand in offering our deepest sympathy to members of the Royal Family at the passing of the Queen. To us she was a much admired and respected monarch, to them she was a mother and grandmother," Ardern said. When asked if the death would rise to a debate on Republicanism, Ardern replied that it was not "...on the agenda anytime soon" but believed it to be "where New Zealand would head in time".
  - Governor-General of New Zealand Dame Cindy Kiro said: "For most New Zealanders, Queen Elizabeth has really been a constant in our lives. She's provided a sense of continuity and stability for us. Kiro said she was "a real symbol of dedication for service", after serving for more than 70 years. I think New Zealanders will remember her for her service, she worked right up till her death at 96 years old which is a reflection of her commitment." Dame Cindy said she was so pleased she got to meet the Queen via Zoom and twice in person, and was able to celebrate her Platinum Jubilee.
- Opposition leader Christopher Luxon described the Queen's death as a "tragedy" and shared childhood memories of meeting the Queen during an official visit she made to New Zealand. He subsequently stated "The strength and stability of Her Majesty's leadership of the Commonwealth was a reassuring anchor for New Zealand and New Zealanders in uncertain and changing times. Through both the tumultuous and the good, her dedicated service embodied the values of duty, commitment, and strength." Luxon also expressed optimism at the prospect of Charles III's reign and cast doubt over the Queen's death accelerating the cause for republicanism in New Zealand in the immediate future, arguing "I think the reality is people are quite satisfied with our constitutional arrangements now, as I am too."
  - Former deputy prime minister Don McKinnon told Radio New Zealand there was a possibility that a republican movement could "build up quite a head of steam now".
  - Co-leader Marama Davidson Green Party released a statement on behalf of the Green Party sending "condolences to the Royal Family". She said that "there is no doubt Queen Elizabeth II cared deeply about Aotearoa New Zealand. Her support during history – making events such as the Christchurch earthquakes – would have been of great comfort to many". She added that although the Queen "herself said it was up to the people of the Commonwealth to define the relationship between the British monarchy...That is a question for another day".
- The New Zealand Government declared a public holiday for 26 September to mourn the death of the Queen.

==== Nations in free association with New Zealand ====
The Cook Islands and Niue are de facto independent countries but de jure part of the Realm of New Zealand, and the monarch of New Zealand is also the head of state of both nations.

- Prime Minister of the Cook Islands Mark Brown said: "I share with all of our people the deep admiration and respect that we held for our Queen. Her Majesty leaves behind an enormous legacy of dedicated service to her subjects including ourselves, around the world. All flags in the country will be flown at half-mast until further notice. A memorial service will be held for Her Majesty." Describing her as a "truly towering figure" in the world, he noted the "enormous social change" she had witnessed, and added: "She endured and provided the strength and constancy for her people at home and in the Commonwealth."
- Premier of Niue Dalton Tagelagi expressed his sadness on "the passing of a most extraordinary woman", praising her "faithfulness to her duties and dedication to her people".

=== Bahamas ===
- Bahamas Governor-General Cornelius A. Smith expressed "deep sadness" on learning of the Queen's death. He recalled Her Majesty's several visits to The Bahamas at which time she was joyfully received by our people. He invited all Bahamians to join in prayer for the repose of the soul of Her Majesty, and for the bereaved members of the Royal Family.
  - Former governor-general Sir Arthur Foulkes said, "She was a towering figure on the world stage and was greatly admired for her unswerving dedication to duty over many decades. Those of us who had the privilege of meeting her also experienced first hand the disarming graciousness, empathy and sense of humor. She leaves a huge void on the international stage that will not be easily filled".
  - Former governor-general Dame Marguerite Pindling said, "I cannot say it enough what a delightful lady she was. I don't know how the Commonwealth will manage. It won't be the same now that she's left us".
- Bahamas Prime Minister Philip Davis sent condolences to the Royal Family on behalf of himself and the people of the Bahamas. He ordered the flag to be flown at half-staff.
  - Former prime minister Hubert Ingraham said he was amazed by the Queen's "incomparable memory". "I have many very fond memories of interacting with Her Majesty, Queen Elizabeth II as one of her Commonwealth prime ministers during my terms in office. I was surprised and honored when I was invited to become a member of Her Majesty's Privy Council just one year past my first anniversary of becoming prime minister and to attend a formal meeting of the Privy Council presided over by Her Majesty on 27th October 1993. And I recall having been honored to be invited to sit at her dinner table on a number of occasions during Commonwealth Heads of Government Meetings. I was always amazed by two things: firstly, how normal, and regular an individual she was in person and secondly, her incomparable memory that permitted her to speak with personal recollection of matters personal to whomever she was speaking. She certainly had a storage of information on The Bahamas!" he said. Ingraham noted that the Queen's last visit to The Bahamas was in 1994 when he served as prime minister. "She was always warmly welcomed by the Bahamian people even as increasing numbers in more recent time began to harbor republican tendencies," he said. He said, "I am grateful for Her Majesty's long commitment to the Commonwealth and pray God's mercy on her soul. May she rest in peace".
  - Former prime minister Perry Christie said that the Queen's "unswerving fidelity to duty and to service over the course of seven decades was unsurpassed, and is likely to remain so". "Speaking for myself personally, it was a pleasure to have been afforded the opportunity to serve non-consecutive terms as first minister of Her Majesty's constitutional government here in The Bahamas," he said.
  - Former prime minister Hubert Minnis said the Queen's life was marked by "her strong sense of duty to all of her realms". "I always admired Her Majesty's deep engagement with the Commonwealth, working toward expanding the sense of unity among diverse cultures from around the world," he said.
- Leader of the Opposition Michael Pintard said, "It is with heartfelt regret that we extend sincere condolences to the Royal Family upon the passing of Her Majesty Queen Elizabeth II." He added, "She reigned with grace and dignity".

=== Papua New Guinea ===
- Papua New Guinea Governor-General Sir Bob Dadae said "it is with a heavy heart that we have received news of the passing of our beloved Queen and Head of State". He said that the Queen "played a pivotal role in unifying our country of a thousand tribes and peoples as one nation". "We thank you Your Majesty for your service to our country as our Queen and Head of State. Farewell our beloved Misis Kwin", he said.
- Papua New Guinea Prime Minister James Marape said the "Papua New Guineans from the mountains, valleys and coasts rose up this morning to the news that our Queen has been taken to rest by God". "We fondly call her 'Mama Queen' because she was the matriarch of our country as much as she was to her family and her Sovereign realms". He said the Queen was the "anchor of our Commonwealth".
  - Former prime minister Sir Julius Chan said that he was "very saddened" to learn of the death of the Queen. "This is indeed the end of an era, an era that will surely be known as the second Elizabethan Era", he said. He said that the Queen "presided over a tumultuous and quickly evolving period in history, and she did so with grace and dignity".
  - Former prime minister Peter O'Neill said that the Queen "was a very knowledgeable and engaging woman who had an excellent understanding of PNG. And she had a great sense of her role and carried her responsibilities selflessly for seven decades right to the very end". "Our Queen of seventy years has died, and we all feel her passing dearly", he said. He said "Her Majesty was an inspirational leader and a constant beacon of certainty and support for all in her Commonwealth and for indeed, the whole world".
- Commissioner of Police David Manning said that the Queen "has been a constant presence and beacon of hope for Papua New Guinea as it took its first step as an independent nation 47 years ago". He said that "25 members of the Royal Papua and New Guinea Constabulary represented the territories and attended the coronation of Her Majesty Queen Elizabeth II". "Her Majesty was the longest serving monarch and has been an integral part of Papua New Guinea and the Constabulary's growth and development over the last 47 years", he added.

=== Other Commonwealth realms ===
- Antigua and Barbuda:
  - Governor-General Sir Rodney Williams said he was "deeply saddened" by the death of the Queen and recalled his previous meetings with her, adding that the flag of the Governor-General of Antigua and Barbuda would be flown at half-mast.
  - Prime Minister Gaston Browne offered his condolences, saying "Her Majesty Queen Elizabeth II has had an impactful reign, during which her relations with my State and its people have remained mutually respectful and unchanging." Shortly after confirming Charles's status as King of the country on 10 September, Browne, a supporter of republicanism, stated that he planned to hold a referendum on converting the country into a republic.
- Belize:
  - Governor-General Dame Froyla Tzalam offered her condolences, stating that the Queen "rulеd fоr lоngеr thаn аnу оthеr Моnаrсh іn Вrіtіѕh hіѕtоrу hаvіng јuѕt сеlеbrаtеd 70 уеаrѕ еаrlіеr thіѕ уеаr", and describing her as "а muсh lоvеd аnd rеѕресtеd fіgurе асrоѕѕ thе glоbе."
  - Prime Minister Johnny Briceño expressed his condolences, noting that Elizabeth II was the only sovereign Belize had ever had and saying that "her seven decades as Queen and Head of the Commonwealth can best be described as remarkable in the midst of these turbulent times." National mourning was declared from 8 September until 18 September with flags ordered to be flown at half staff.

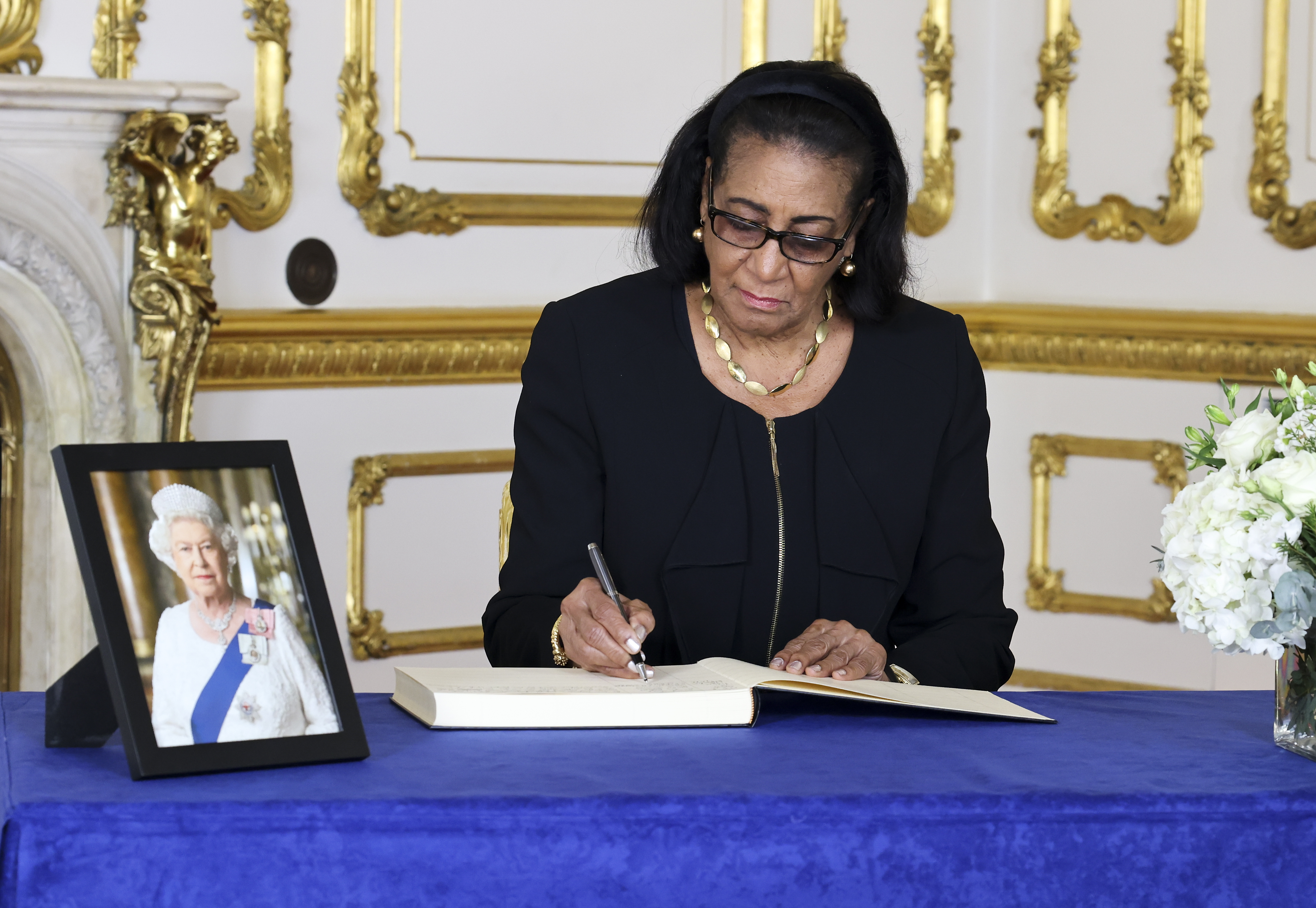
Dame Cecile La Grenade signing the book of condolence

- Grenada:
  - Governor General
  - Prime Minister Dickon Mitchell expressed his condolences, saying "As Head of the Commonwealth, Her Majesty's steady leadership helped to unite people and countries from around the globe in a common cause, and for this, Queen Elizabeth II will always be remembered."
- Jamaica:
  - Governor-General Sir Patrick Allen stated that the Queen was "widely acknowledged for her exemplary leadership, dignity, humility, and generosity. These qualities have characterized her reign even into the modern times and have impacted the Commonwealth immensely."
  - Prime Minister Andrew Holness described the Queen as a "close friend of Jamaica" and expressed his condolences. Flags were ordered to be flown at half mast for 11 days beginning 8 September with a national mourning day declared for 18 September.
    - Former prime minister P. J. Patterson said that the death of the Queen is a "monumental loss", hailing her "total dedication to duty" and "strength of spirit".
  - Leader of the Opposition Mark Golding described the Queen as "a much-respected and loved lady", and "for many all around the globe, she has been a symbol of decency, stability and continuity throughout our lives".
  - Jamaican MP Mikael Phillips stated his desire that the end of the Queen's reign would hasten Jamaica's transition to a republic.
- Saint Kitts and Nevis:
  - Governor-General Sir Tapley Seaton offered his condolences.
  - Prime Minister Terrance Drew described the Queen's reign as being "marked by resilience, dignity, duty, quiet faith and piety" and offered prayers for the royal family.
  - Premier of Nevis Mark Brantley stated "I believe that the world has lost an iconic figure, not because of her age or longevity as Monarch but because she has inspired generations throughout the United Kingdom, The Commonwealth and the wider world through her grace and dignity."
  - The Saint Kitts and Nevis Labour Party, in government at the time, issued a statement saying that "Queen Elizabeth II was a global matriarch, revered for her dedication, humanitarian efforts, sovereignty, and enormous contributions not just within the Caribbean but worldwide."
- Saint Lucia:
  - Acting governor-general Errol Charles declared a 10-day period of national mourning up to the day of the funeral. He stated that "Her Majesty, as the head of the Commonwealth and Queen of Saint Lucia has served us with great pride and dignity and will be sincerely missed".
  - Prime Minister Philip J. Pierre conveyed his condolences, stating that the Queen "will forever be an enduring symbol of stability and strength throughout the Commonwealth Region and the world".
    - Former prime minister and sitting opposition leader Allen Chastanet expressed his condolences, but also told Reuters that he "certainly at this point would support becoming a republic".
- Saint Vincent and the Grenadines:
  - Governor-General Dame Susan Dougan said she was "deeply saddened" to learn of the Queen's death, adding that the Commonwealth "has been truly blessed with a monarch viewed by millions of people as a symbol of stability and a driving force for meaningful change."
  - Prime Minister Ralph Gonsalves declared a period of mourning for the Queen, describing her as "a woman of dignity, a head of state who kept stability for the British in the United Kingdom and who as head of the Commonwealth particularly made important contributions towards the advancement of democracy and decolonization of former British colonies." A period of national mourning was declared.
- Solomon Islands:
  - The government of Solomon Islands declared 12 September to be a public holiday and announced a period of three days mourning (12–14 September).
  - Acting governor-general Patteson Oti (representing Governor-General Sir David Vunagi) said: "Solomon Islands as the realm and a member of the Commonwealth must therefore joined [sic] the Royal Family and the people of the world in mourning the loss of Her Majesty, The Queen. On behalf of the Government and people of Solomon Islands I humbly take this opportunity to express to members of the Royal Family God's gracious mercy, comfort, strength and love through the recent time of mourning. Let the soul of her Majesty Queen Elizabeth II, The Queen of Solomon Islands, rest in peace."
  - Prime Minister Manasseh Sogavare called on Solomon Islanders to pray for the royal family and the Commonwealth.
- Tuvalu:
  - Acting prime minister Simon Kofe said: "We were fortunate to have the Queen visit us in our history, and we recognize her incredible commitment to service and the critical role she has played through transformational times in our world. Today, we mourn Her Majesty's passing, and we convey our deepest condolences to her family and loved ones. However, we also celebrate the legacy of steady leadership Her Majesty the Queen has left to us, which has inspired many throughout our world."
  - The Ministry of Justice and Foreign Affairs wrote on Twitter that "The Ministry mourns the passing of Queen Elizabeth II. Through 70 years of dedicated service, the Queen provided stability in a consistently changing world, and deepest condolences are extended to the family and loved ones of the Queen in this time of loss."

=== Other Commonwealth countries ===
- Bangladesh:
  - The government of Bangladesh declared three days of state mourning from 9 to 11 September 2022 to mark "the death of British Queen Elizabeth II, a true friend of Bangladesh," according to a gazette published by the cabinet office. The national flag was lowered to half-mast at "all government, semi-government, autonomous, educational institutions, and Bangladeshi missions abroad".
  - President Mohammad Abdul Hamid sent a condolence message to King Charles III, where he stated, "It is with the deepest of sorrow and heaviest of heart that I extend my sincerest condolences and sympathies at the sad demise of Her Majesty, Queen Elizabeth II, the second longest-reigning monarch in the world." In the message dated 8 September 2022, he recalled her contribution and dedication for the United Kingdom and Commonwealth and added, "May the Almighty bless Her Majesty's departed soul with eternal peace and salvation, and grant courage and fortitude to the members of the Royal family and the grieving people of the United Kingdom to bear this devastating loss."
  - Prime Minister Sheikh Hasina conveyed a condolence telegram to her British counterpart Liz Truss on behalf of the Bangladeshis. On that letter she said, "As the most legendary and longest reigning Monarch in the world's contemporary history, Her Majesty set the highest standards of duty, service, and sacrifice and left an unmatchable legacy of dedication to her countless people around the world." She recalled the Queen's two royal visits to modern-day Bangladesh, the Queen's interactions with Bangabandhu Sheikh Mujibur Rahman in Ottawa and Kingston and recalled interactions between the Queen and herself and their last interaction at 2018 CHoGM. Sheikh Hasina mentioned that the Queen's most passionate message of felicitation extended to the people of Bangladesh on the Golden Jubilee of Bangladesh's independence where she wrote "We share ties of friendship and affection, which remain the foundation of our partnership and are as important today as fifty years ago". Later in the letter she also added, "I, personally, have not only lost a most trusted friend but also a true guardian." The Bangladeshi prime minister described Queen Elizabeth II as the "pillar and strength of the 2.5 billion Commonwealth people."
  - Shortly after the announcement from Buckingham Palace, the Minister of Foreign Affairs AK Abdul Momen expressed shock and sadness over her demise. He said, "A legend passed away. She left a legacy incomparable in human history and lived with honour, grace and dignity. We are deeply shocked." He also recalled his meeting with the Queen twice- once in 1961 when he was a schoolboy and the Queen visited the then East Pakistan and again when she paid a visit to the United Nations in 2010.
- Barbados: President of Barbados Sandra Mason expressed her condolences. Noting that Barbados had removed Elizabeth II as its queen less than a year prior upon becoming a parliamentary republic, making Mason the country's first president, she stated: "Significant as that decision was, given the place Barbados has held in the British Empire for centuries, it did not in the least diminish the friendship between our two nations or, indeed, with Buckingham Palace". She said that the Queen "will always hold a special place in our hearts and we in Barbados will always treasure the memories of her visits to the island".
- Botswana: President Dr Mokgweetsi Masisi, in a press statement, stated that: "The Queen's legacy of selfless dedication to serve over 70 years is second to none. Her dedication to not only the United Kingdom but also the Commonwealth shall forever remain etched in our hearts." Masisi also declared that Botswana observed a period of mourning, which include flying flags at half-mast from September 9 until the funeral.
- Cyprus: President of Cyprus Nicos Anastasiades tweeted, "We offer our most sincere condolences for the passing of Her Majesty Queen Elizabeth II. At these difficult times our thoughts are with the Royal Family and the people of the United Kingdom."
- Dominica: Prime Minister of Dominica Roosevelt Skerrit expressed condolences on behalf of the government and people of Dominica via Twitter. The government of Dominica, where Elizabeth II had been queen until 1978, declared a two-day period of national mourning.
- Fiji:
  - Prime Minister of Fiji Frank Bainimarama said that, "We will always appreciate it when she is happy to have a working visit to Fiji. Every moment is a blessing, her courage and wise attitude have made people comfortable and inspired, even worldly." He added: "Fijian hearts are heavy this morning as we bid farewell to Her Majesty Queen Elizabeth II". Elizabeth II was Queen of Fiji from 1970 to 1987.
  - Former prime minister Sitiveni Rabuka said that "the people of Fiji join the people of the United Kingdom and the international community of nations in mourning the passing of Her Majesty Queen Elizabeth II." He also added that he had formally apologised to Elizabeth II in 1997 at Windsor Castle for the 1987 Fijian coups d'état during which he proclaimed Fiji a republic.
  - President of Fiji Williame Katonivere acknowledged the death of Elizabeth II adding that "every Fijian has in one way or another have seen a picture, video or heard about Queen Elizabeth given Fiji's prior connection to Britain."
- Gabon: President of Gabon Ali Bongo Ondimba sent his "sincere condolences" to King Charles III and his family via Twitter. He praised "a great friend of Africa", adding, "Tonight, the Commonwealth family mourns Queen Elizabeth II."
- The Gambia: President of the Gambia Adama Barrow dispatched a letter of condolence to King Charles III, saying: "On behalf of the Government, the People of The Gambia, and on his own behalf, the President expressed grief and extended heartfelt condolences to His Majesty, the Royal family, and the entire people of Great Britain. The President prayed for Allah to bestow mercy on Her Majesty's soul and grant the Royal family, the people of the United Kingdom, and the Commonwealth family the fortitude to bear this great loss."
- Ghana: President of Ghana Nana Akufo-Addo said his "thoughts and the thoughts of all Ghanaians, at home and abroad, are with Queen Elizabeth II", and announced that Ghanaian flags would be flown at half-mast for seven days. Statements were also released by former presidents John Mahama and John Kufuor.
- Guyana: President of Guyana Irfaan Ali in a statement expressed "profound and deepest sorrow at the death of Her Majesty, Queen Elizabeth II". The president further noted that the death of the Queen "marks the end of an era in the history of the British Monarchy, the United Kingdom, and the Commonwealth of Nations" and that her visits to Guyana "are recalled with great fondness." The statement ended by noting that the "thoughts of all Guyana are with the members of the Royal Family and the people of the United Kingdom. We join in heralding the life of the longest-serving British Monarch and mourn her passing." The day of the funeral on 19 September was declared a day of national mourning.
- India:
  - The Government of India declared a day of national mourning on 11 September "as a mark of respect" to the Queen, and ordered flags to be flown at half-mast throughout the country.
  - Indian President Droupadi Murmu expressed her "heartfelt condolences" and said that the world has lost a "great personality", who "steered her country and people for over 7 decades".
  - Indian Vice-President Jagdeep Dhankhar said that the Queen "leaves behind a rich legacy of inspired leadership, dignity and graceful magnanimity", and "her long reign oversaw the transformation of her country in many ways".
  - Indian Prime Minister Narendra Modi said that he was "pained" by the Queen's death, and said that she "will be remembered as a stalwart of our times". He said: "I had memorable meetings with Her Majesty Queen Elizabeth II during my UK visits in 2015 and 2018. I will never forget her warmth and kindness. During one of the meetings she showed me the handkerchief Mahatma Gandhi gifted her on her wedding. I will always cherish that gesture". Modi expressed "his heartfelt condolences" in a call with British prime minister Liz Truss, which he said were "on behalf of 1.3 billion Indians".
  - Union Minister for Commerce and Industry Piyush Goyal expressed his condolences and said that the Queen was "a true friend of India". "She was known to be a very sensitive person, very human in her outlook and clearly a woman of substance", he said.
  - President of the Indian National Congress Sonia Gandhi said that the Queen was "a great and much-loved figure of our times", whose death is "an occasion to remember her warm association with our country, cherished by her and by us". She said that her many visits to India "both symbolised and cemented the close relationship between our two countries", and "India's association with Queen Elizabeth II will abide in history".
  - Senior Congress politician Rahul Gandhi expressed his condolences and said that the Queen "had a long and glorious reign, serving her country with utmost commitment and dignity".
  - Chief Ministers Himanta Biswa Sarma of Assam, Arvind Kejriwal of Delhi, Conrad Sangma of Meghalaya, Ashok Gehlot of Rajasthan, M. K. Stalin of Tamil Nadu, and Mamata Banerjee of West Bengal also expressed their condolences.
- Kenya: In a statement on the website of the president of Kenya, President Uhuru Kenyatta remarked, "Her Majesty Queen Elizabeth II was a towering icon of selfless service to humanity and a key figurehead of not only the United Kingdom and the Commonwealth of Nations where Kenya is a distinguished member but the entire world." resident-elect William Ruto said "The queen's leadership of the Commonwealth for the past seven decades is admirable." and "She steered the institution's evolution into a forum for effective multilateral engagement whose potential to drive tremendous socioeconomic progress remain incontestable." Four days of mourning were declared with the flag to be flown at half mast.
  - In an article on Britain's former colonies, The Associated Press noted how this drew anger from some ordinary people who "beyond official condolences" held "some bitterness about the past" in regards to the harsh British resistance of the Mau Mau rebellion that continued into Elizabeth's reign. Readers were also reminded that the then-president's father and former president himself, Jomo Kenyatta, was imprisoned for his role in organising the rebellion throughout the Queen's reign over Kenya.
- Malawi: Ten days of national mourning were declared with flags to be flown at half mast. Malawian president Lazarus Chakwera, said on Facebook that "we mourn the passing of a great monarch", and expressed his "deepest condolences" noting that Queen Elizabeth was the Queen of Malawi from 1964 to 1966. He added that "For us as a nation, her inimitable legacy as friend of Malawi will forever be etched in our hearts and indelibly marked in the pages of our history."
- Malaysia:
  - Prime Minister of Malaysia Ismail Sabri Yaakob offered his "deepest condolences" over the death the Queen on behalf of the Government in a Facebook post. "Our thoughts and prayers are with the bereaved people of the United Kingdom during this time of mourning and sorrow. May Her Majesty's soul rest in peace." The Prime Minister also signed a book of condolences at the British High Commission.
  - Minister of Foreign Affairs Saifuddin Abdullah also conveyed Malaysia's condolences over the death of Queen Elizabeth II. "Malaysia extends (its) sincere condolences to the monarch's family, the people and the government of the United Kingdom on the passing of Queen Elizabeth II," he said in a Facebook post.
  - Former Malaysian Prime Minister Mahathir Mohamad paid tribute to the late Queen on his Twitter, describing her as a "good example of a constitutional monarch". He also remarked that the Queen's death was unexpected to him as "[s]he was only one year younger than me". "Her passing away is a loss not just to the British but to people who believe in the rule of law."
  - Leader of the Opposition Anwar Ibrahim conveyed his condolences to the British Royal Family and signed the book of condolences at the British High Commission in Kuala Lumpur. He stated that "Her Majesty inspired throughout her lifetime of service. Her life and legacy will be fondly remembered by many around the world."
  - Chief Minister of Penang Chow Kon Yeow expressed his condolences on behalf of Penang in a Facebook post, stating that "The Queen's steadfast devotion throughout her life-long service to the Crown, her country, her people, and the citizens of the Commonwealth of Nations may never be matched". Chow also said "like many others in his generation, he grew up not knowing any other ruling British monarch apart from the Queen" and acknowledged that George Town was granted city status by the Queen in January 1957. The Yang di-Pertuan Negeri of Penang also ordered the state flag to be flown at half mast for 3 days from 17 September until the day of the funeral on 19 September.
  - Menteri Besar of Pahang Wan Rosdy Wan Ismail conveyed his condolences to the British Royal Family and the British people on Facebook, stating that he was "deeply saddened by the loss of Her Majesty Queen Elizabeth II, the world's longest serving Head of State and one of the most respected personalities worldwide."
- Maldives: President of the Maldives Ibrahim Mohamed Solih sent a message of condolence and declared three days of national mourning.
- Malta: The day of the funeral was declared a day of national mourning.
- Mozambique: President of Mozambique Filipe Nyusi released a statement on Facebook stating: "It was with deep regret that I learned of the death of Her Majesty Queen Elizabeth II. Your loyalty and sense of mission to your country and the world is admirable. Queen Elizabeth II personified an understated vigor and the world was fortunate to witness it for decades. On behalf of the Mozambican people, the Government and myself, I convey our heartfelt condolences to His Majesty King Charles III, the family, people and Government of the United Kingdom." The Mozambican government has declared three days of national mourning, from Saturday 17 to Monday 19.
- Nauru: On Facebook, the government released a statement declaring that the flag of Nauru would be flown at half-mast and that president Lionel Aingimea had declared Monday 12 September a public holiday in remembrance of the Queen.
- Nigeria: Muhammadu Buhari, the president of Nigeria, took to his official Twitter account to express his condolence on behalf of his family and 200 million Nigerians. He stated that Elizabeth II was "the only British Sovereign known to 90 percent of our population" and said that the story of Nigeria will not be complete without a chapter on her.
  - Former president Goodluck Jonathan expressed his condolences on his Twitter account.
- Pakistan: Shehbaz Sharif, the prime minister of Pakistan, stated that he was "deeply grieved" and that the country "joins the UK & other Commonwealth nations in mourning her death". Arif Alvi, the president of Pakistan, expressed his sincere condolences to the royal family, government, and people of Britain in a post on social media. A day of mourning on 12 September 2022 was declared by the government of Pakistan with flag to be flown at half mast.
- Rwanda: President of Rwanda and concurrent Commonwealth Chair-in-Office Paul Kagame stated, "I extend my condolences to his majesty, the King, her majesty, the Queen Consort, and the entire royal family, as well as the people of the United Kingdom and the Commonwealth." Kagame also said that the modern Commonwealth is the legacy that the Queen leaves after dying at the age of 96. From 9 September the Rwandan flag was flown at half mast sign national mourning and is to be flown like that until after the funeral of the queen.
- Samoa: The O le Ao o le Malo (head of state), Tuimalealiʻifano Vaʻaletoʻa Sualauvi II, expressed on behalf of the government and the people of Samoa, deepest condolences to His Majesty King Charles III for the death of Her Majesty Queen Elizabeth II. Afioga i le Ao Mamalu stated that "Her Majesty's reign represented strength, stability and inspired leadership, and in a rapidly changing world and challenges, Her Majesty's selfless service was a constant point of wisdom and courage for the people of Samoa". "Her Majesty will be warmly remembered for her dedication, unwavering support and immeasurable contribution to the development and advancement of the people of Samoa, the Pacific region, and the Commonwealth family alike," he continued. The head of state also extended Samoa's prayers of comfort to the Royal Family, people, and the Government of the United Kingdom during this time of sorrow.
- Seychelles: Following the death of Queen Elizabeth II, the president of Seychelles, Wavel Ramkalawan paid a visit on 9 September 2022 to the British High Commission in Victoria where he paid his respects and signed the condolence book. This was in the presence of the British High Commissioner for Seychelles, Patrick Lynch. The President was accompanied by Vice-President Ahmed Afif, and Designated Minister, Jean-François Ferrari who also paid their tribute by signing the condolence book. The President also ordered flags in Seychelles to fly at half-mast.
- Singapore:
  - Singaporean president, Halimah Yacob extended a letter of condolences to King Charles III on the death of Queen Elizabeth II, and referring to the latter as "a wellspring of strength and inspiration" to the British people and to the Commonwealth. Former president Tony Tan also expressed his condolences.
  - Singaporean prime minister, Lee Hsien Loong expressed his condolences via his Facebook page, "to King Charles III and all other members of the Royal Family, PM Liz Truss, and the British people." Singaporean Deputy Prime Ministers Lawrence Wong and Heng Swee Keat and Singaporean Speaker of Parliament Tan Chuan-Jin also expressed their condolences. The Parliament of Singapore observed a minute of silence on 12 September 2022 and a tribute was led by Leader of the House Indranee Rajah, and flags will fly at half mast on the day of the funeral.
- South Africa: The President of South Africa Cyril Ramaphosa issued a statement expressing his condolences, stating that, "Her Majesty was an extraordinary and world-renowned public figure who lived a remarkable life. Her life and legacy will be fondly remembered by many around the world. The Queen's commitment and dedication during her 70 years on the throne remains a noble and virtuous example to the entire world."
- Sri Lanka: President of Sri Lanka Ranil Wickremesinghe expressed his condolences and labelled the queen as a "symbol of stability and endurance". National flags are to be flown at half mast and 19 September was declared as a day of mourning.
- Tanzania: Tanzanian President Samia Suluhu Hassan said in a message of condolences via Twitter that she was "deeply saddened" by the death of Queen Elizabeth. Additionally, according to Hassan, "the whole world will remember the Queen as a pillar of strength, of peace, unity and stability." 5 days, in which flags were to be flown at half mast, of mourning were declared.
- Togo: President of Togo Faure Gnassingbé expressed on Twitter his "heartfelt condolences to the British people and the great Commonwealth family ... The sadness at the passing of Queen Elizabeth II today goes beyond Great Britain and expands to the whole world, as the late Queen was undoubtedly an universal figure of her country's influence and friendship towards peoples worldwide."
- Trinidad and Tobago: Acting prime minister Colm Imbert (representing Prime Minister Keith Rowley, who was traveling outside of the country at the time) said in Parliament that the Government and Trinidad & Tobago's people joined the rest of the world in mourning the death of Her Royal Majesty. He also extended sincerest condolences to King Charles III and her family, "... As well as to the people of the United Kingdom who, for more than two generations, have known only one Sovereign, their beloved Queen. She was their one constant in a rapidly evolving world, and many have never known a world without her." Flags were flown at half mast on 8 and 9 September and again on the day of the funeral.
- Zambia: The office of the president of Zambia, Hakainde Hichilema, released a statement that says: "President Hichilema stands together with members of the Royal Family and the people of the United Kingdom and the entire Commonwealth, and expresses his immense pride in Her Majesty's numerous accomplishments during her extraordinary life and reign spanning nearly 70 years. The President notes that Her Majesty the Queen will be remembered for her devotion to public service, her deep sense of duty to country, and for her immeasurable contributions to the promotion of good governance, human rights, and the various charities and patronages to which she was associated. Her Majesty oversaw seismic shifts in the global social, cultural, political, and economic landscape during her unprecedented reign. Her Majesty Queen Elizabeth II will forever remain an inspiration and a symbol of steadfast, resolute and unwavering leadership, not only to the people of Zambia but to all citizens of the Commonwealth and indeed of the world. The President joins the United Kingdom of Great Britain and Northern Ireland, the Commonwealth and indeed the world in mourning Her Majesty, while his thoughts and prayers, and those of the people of the Republic of Zambia, go to the Royal family." The day of the funeral was declared a day of national mourning.

=== Other countries ===
==== Africa ====
- President of Algeria Abdelmadjid Tebboune released the following statement: "It is with great sadness and deep emotion that we have learned of the passing of Her Majesty the Queen of Great Britain and Northern Ireland, Elizabeth II. In this painful circumstance, I present to you and to the royal family and to the British people, on behalf of the Algerian people and government, my sincere condolences and assure you of our deepest feelings of compassion and solidarity. It is a painful ordeal to lose one of the foundations of the United Kingdom and one of the veteran leaders who dedicated her life to the service of her country. We remember today her historical contributions and her pioneering initiatives with a view to guaranteeing peace, stability, progress and prosperity for the British people, by adapting wisely and foresightedly to the political, economic and social changes and mutations which have taken place on the international scene throughout her 70 years of reign. Proud of the privileged relations it maintains with the United Kingdom of Great Britain, Algeria wishes to underline the role of the deceased in the promotion of bilateral relations in consecration of the relations of friendship linking our two peoples and their common aspirations to further progress and prosperity. With her demise, Algeria loses one of its loyal friends in all the circumstances and stages it has gone through. I reiterate my sincere condolences and my deep feelings of compassion as well as the support of the Algerian people in this painful ordeal which has bereaved the royal family and the friendly British people. Please Your Majesty to accept the expression of my highest consideration and friendship."
- President João Lourenço and First Lady of Angola Ana Dias Lourenço visited the British embassy in Luanda and signed the book of condolences for the death of Queen Elizabeth II. The President said the Queen's reign "has forever marked the British people, which it served, contributing to its edification as a thriving nation, whose process serves as a reference for all peoples globally." In the book of condolences, João Lourenço wrote that "this fateful event leaves a huge void in the world and determines the end of the era of a monarch who stood out for her dynamism and firmness."
- President of Benin Patrice Talon tweeted: "A remarkable woman, Queen Elizabeth II will forever remain a major figure in the political history of the world, in our time. To his family and to the people of the United Kingdom, I want to say my pain and that of the people of Benin. I express to them our compassion and our solidarity in these moments of great pain."
- President of Burundi Évariste Ndayishimiye tweeted: "I am deeply saddened by the passing of Her Majesty Queen Elizabeth II, I extend my heartfelt condolences to the Royal family and the friendly people of United Kingdom. She has been an inspiration for generations around the world and will be remembered for her great leadership."
- President of Cabo Verde José Maria Neves stated in a letter to Buckingham Palace: "It was with great sadness and immense sadness that I received the news of the passing of Her Majesty Queen Elizabeth II. She indelibly marks the history of the United Kingdom and the world, for her example of perseverance and leadership throughout her 70 years of reign, and for the constant progress of her people. A true source of inspiration ... In this moment of pain, the Head of State presents His Majesty, in on behalf of the Cape Verdean people and on their own, the deepest and most heartfelt condolences for this irreparable loss, feelings extended to the British people."
- The president of the Central African Republic Faustin-Archange Touadéra said in a Twitter thread: "Today one of the most remarkable figures of the century has left us: Queen Elizabeth II. An example of a #monarch who during her 70 years reign dedicated her life to the throne and her people. An extraordinary #legacy and a true #inspiration to the #world. My heartfelt condolences to the Royal Family, the entire #British Nation and to all #Commonwealth countries!"
- The president of the Transitional Military Council of the Republic of Chad, General Mahamat Déby, said in a Twitter thread: "Following the death of Queen Elizabeth II, which occurred this afternoon, I would like to offer my deepest condolences to the British people and to all the peoples and governments of the Commonwealth of Nations. I salute the memory of the British sovereign who was a planetary figure having served for seven decades a great country, a great people and great causes. Rest in peace."
- The president of the Comoros Azali Assoumani wrote a message of condolence posted on Facebook, saying: "In this painful context, he (President Assoumani)] presents to His Majesty the King Charles IIII and through Him to the Royal family as well as to all British subjects, his condolences and his deep compassion. He joins forces with the international community to make a well-deserved tribute to this international icon who devoted her entire reign to the service of her people with great dedication and a lot of humility and who also knew to win the friendship and trust of the whole international community."
- The president of the Democratic Republic of the Congo Félix Tshisekedi, expressed "his sadness" on Twitter about the queen's death, calling it "an immense loss for the United Kingdom and for the world."
- The president of the Republic of the Congo Denis Sassou Nguesso said, in a message to King Charles III, posted on Instagram: "In this painful circumstance, I extend to you, on behalf of the Congolese People and Government as well as my own, to yourself, to the British People and to the entire bereaved family, my deepest condolences."
- The president of Djibouti Ismaïl Omar Guelleh tweeted: "It is with great sadness that we learnt the somber news of Queen Elizabeth II's passing. On behalf of the entire Djiboutian Nation, I send the @royalfamily our most sincere condolences in these times of mourning as well as our deepest sympathies to the entire British public."
- President of Egypt Abdel Fattah el-Sisi stated, "My condolences go out to the British Nation for the great loss and the full confidence in King Charles' capacity to fill the void Queen Elizabeth II shall leave behind."
- The minister of foreign affairs and Cooperation of Equatorial Guinea Simeón Oyono Esono Angüe tweeted: "With deep regret we have learned of the death of Her Majesty, Queen Elizabeth II. On behalf of the people and the government of Equatorial Guinea, I express my deepest condolences to His Majesty, King Charles, to the rest of the Royal Family and to the people and government of the United Kingdom."
- The president of Eritrea Isaias Afwerki sent a message expressing "his condolences to King Charles III and through him to the Government of the United Kingdom of Great Britain and Northern Ireland".
- The prime minister of Ethiopia Abiy Ahmed stated, in a tweet, "On behalf of the Government and people of Ethiopia, I extend deepest condolences to the British Royal Family, the Government and the people of Great Britain on the death of HM Queen Elizabeth II."
- The prime minister of Guinea Bernard Goumou went to the British embassy in Conakry on 10 September 2022 and offered condolences on behalf of the head of state (Interim president Mamady Doumbouya) and also signed the book of condolences, writing that the Queen was: "A personality of great determination and great convictions, motivated by a sense of duty towards others."
- The president of Guinea-Bissau Umaro Sissoco Embaló described the Queen as a "majestic symbol of union, respect and stability" on social media.
- The president of Ivory Coast Alassane Ouattara said that he learned Queen Elizabeth II's death "with deep emotion". He also said, "I salute the memory of an exceptional stateswoman, with great human qualities. I send my most heartfelt condolences to King Charles III, the Royal Family and the British people".
- The president of Liberia George Weah, in a statement, expressed sadness over the death of Queen Elizabeth II. The statement also says: "The President conveys his deepest sympathy to the governments and peoples of the UK and all nations of the commonwealth that have been immensely impacted by the Queen's death. She reigned for 70 years and celebrated her 96th birth anniversary last April. President Weah described the death of the Queen as a colossal loss to the world. He said Liberia too has lost a friend, who paid a historical visit to Monrovia in 1961 during the celebration of Liberia's independence. Her entourage at the time, which included her deceased husband Prince Philip the Duke of Edinburgh, received a momentous welcome. ... President Weah said he shares in the grief of the British people having spent some of his careers as a professional football player in the country. He also conveyed his condolences to the Royal family, saying that he prays that they find solace in the Lord."
- The prime minister of Libya Abdul Hamid Dbeibeh tweeted: "Sincere condolences and sympathy to the British Royal Family and its people on the death of Queen Elizabeth II. The Queen has always been a symbol of the unity of her country and the service of her people." In addition, claimant to the office of Prime Minister of Libya Fathi Bashagha (recognized by the Libyan House of Representatives) tweeted: "On my behalf and on behalf of the Libyan government, I extend my sincere condolences and sympathy to the United Kingdom and the British people on the death of Queen Elizabeth II."
- The president of Madagascar Andry Rajoelina tweeted: "During more than 70 years of reign, Her Majesty Queen Elizabeth II has inspired many generations in her country and around the world. The Malagasy people join me in expressing our deepest condolences to the British people, and particularly to the Royal Family."
- The ambassador of Mali in Brussels (accredited to the United Kingdom) El Hadji Alhousseini Traoré expressed "heartfelt condolences to the Government and people of United Kingdom on the death of #QueenElizabeth" calling her "a sovereign always in communion with her people. Major figure of our time." He also signed the condolence book at the Mission of the UK to the EU in Brussels.
- On 9 September 2022, Mohamed Ould Ghazouani, President of Mauritania, sent a message of condolences to King Charles III which read: "Majesty, We learned with great sadness of the death of Queen Elizabeth II, Queen of the United Kingdom, and Northern Ireland. In this painful circumstance, I would like to express, on my behalf and behalf of the Mauritanian government and people, to your Majesty the entire royal family, and the friendly British people our sincere condolences and our compassion. Throughout her life, Queen Elizabeth II worked with her usual wisdom to consolidate the values of tolerance and understanding between people. Please accept, Your Majesty, the assurances of my highest consideration."
- The president of Niger Mohamed Bazoum tweeted: "The death of Queen Elizabeth II is a great loss for the United Kingdom and the whole world. History will remember her as a courageous, lucid queen steeped in the values of humanism. My heartfelt condolences to his family and to the English people."
- Although São Tomé and Príncipe does not maintain an embassy in the United Kingdom, on its Facebook page, the "Casa de São Tomé e Príncipe no Reino Unido" based in London (a non-profit organization which offers many of the services an embassy would provide to the citizens of São Tomé e Príncipe living and working in the United Kingdom and aims to foster closer ties between the two countries) expressed its "heartfelt condolences to the British Royal Family, the British people, and to the Commonwealth" on the death of Queen Elizabeth II.
- The president of Senegal Macky Sall, offered his "heartfelt condolences to the government and people of Britain". He saluted Queen Elizabeth, whom he referred to as "illustrious" and had an "exceptional career".
- President of Somalia Hassan Sheikh Mohamud tweeted: "I pass my deepest condolences & that of my nation to the government, people & Royal family of the UK on the passing of Her Majesty Queen Elizabeth II. The Queen represented her nation & citizens with great honour & dignity at home & on the world stage throughout her reign."
- President of Somaliland Muse Bihi Abdi expressed his condolences, saying that the Queen's "dedication to public service and unwavering leadership will inspire many generations to come."
- The embassy of South Sudan in the United Kingdom posted a statement offering condolences "on behalf of the Government and people of the RSS".
- The Twitter account of the Transitional Sovereignty Council of Sudan stated: "The Chairman of the Transitional Sovereignty Council, General Abdel Fattah al-Burhan, mourns with great sadness, sorrow and deep affection, Her Majesty Queen Elizabeth II, Queen of Britain, who passed away today."
- President of Tunisia Kais Saied and Prime Minister Najla Bouden separately visited the residence of the British ambassador to Tunisia to sign a book of condolences. President Saied said that the Queen "was one of the symbols of modern history in the whole world", and that he "wanted to be the first to mourn, which is an indication of the depth of relations between the two countries."
- The president of Zimbabwe Emmerson Mnangagwa wrote on Twitter, "My deepest condolences to the @RoyalFamily, the people of the United Kingdom, and the Commonwealth as they mourn the death of HM Queen Elizabeth II. May she rest in peace."

==== Asia ====
- Chargé d'Affaires of Afghanistan's Permanent Mission to the United Nations Naseer Faiq, who represents the country's internationally-recognized former government, the Islamic Republic of Afghanistan, signed Elizabeth II's condolence book and "expressed sincere condolences and sympathies to the royal family, Government and People of the UK on the sad demise of HM Queen Elizabeth II".
  - The ruling Taliban made no official statement on the Queen's death.
- Prime Minister of Armenia Nikol Pashinyan sent condolences to Prime Minister Liz Truss, stating that "The death of the Queen is a great pain and loss not only for the British people, the peoples of the Commonwealth of Nations, but also for the entire international community" and "The Queen embodying almost an entire era of history will remain vivid in the memories of all of us."
  - Former president of Armenia Armen Sarkissian sent his condolences to King Charles III, saying that her "uprightness, sense of duty and devotion to her country, wisdom and humanity were admirable."
- President of Azerbaijan Ilham Aliyev sent his condolences to both King Charles III and Prime Minister Liz Truss. The statement read in full, "Majesty, It is with heavy hearts we have received the news of the passing away of your mother – Her Majesty Elisabeth II, Queen of Great Britain and Northern Ireland – and the outstanding Head of State of our times. On this great loss, I share my sympathies with you and your entire Family, express my deep condolences and wish patience on my own behalf and on behalf of the people of Azerbaijan. Being as the exemplary one on her glorious lifetime pathway, the Queen has always remained committed to all human ideals, and demonstrated her strong firmness, unshakeable will and determination as she has been giving exceptional services for the bright future of the United Kingdom, and thus, earning a great prestige and respect throughout the entire world due to her infinite commitment and love to the Motherland. I will always cherish the best memories on my meeting with Her Majesty in 2009. Majesty, I renew my deep condolences to you, members of your Family, the United Kingdom and your people."
- Prime Minister of Bhutan Lotay Tshering offered condolences on Twitter, stating "Truly saddened by the news of passing of Queen Elizabeth II. People of Bhutan and I offer our deepest condolences. Bhutan observes the mourning with nationwide prayers today. We'll always remember Her Majesty as an epitome of wisdom and devotion, touching lives around the world." A day of national mourning was observed on 9 September in memory of the late Queen.
- Prime Minister of Cambodia Hun Sen sent his condolences to Prime Minister Liz Truss. The statement read in full, "It is with profound grief to have learned of the passing of Her Majesty Elizabeth II, the Queen of the United Kingdom of Great Britain and Northern Ireland, on the 08th [sic] of September 2022 in the Balmoral Castle, Scotland. Her Majesty Elizabeth II, who has emerged as a beloved public figure through her reign, discipline and inspiration, will forever be remembered in the heart of all the British people and many others around the world. In this moment of deep sorrow, please allow me to extend my deepest sorrow, sympathy and condolences on behalf of the Royal Government and the People of Cambodia to Your Honorable and especially through you to the bereaved families of the Royal Households for this immense loss. May her soul rests in peace."
- General Secretary of the Chinese Communist Party and President of China Xi Jinping sent his condolences to King Charles III, stating that "As Britain's longest-reigning monarch in history, Queen Elizabeth II is widely acclaimed. Queen Elizabeth II is the first British monarch to ever visited China. Her passing is a great loss to the British people." Xi also pledged to King Charles III to foster positive relations between China and the United Kingdom, reflecting on fifty years since the United Kingdom and People's Republic of China raised diplomatic relations to the ambassadorial level.
  - Premier of China Li Keqiang sent his condolences to Prime Minister Liz Truss.
  - Vice President of China Wang Qishan visited the British embassy in Beijing on 12 September to offer his condolences on the death of Queen Elizabeth II, speaking highly of the queen's contribution to the ties of the two countries.

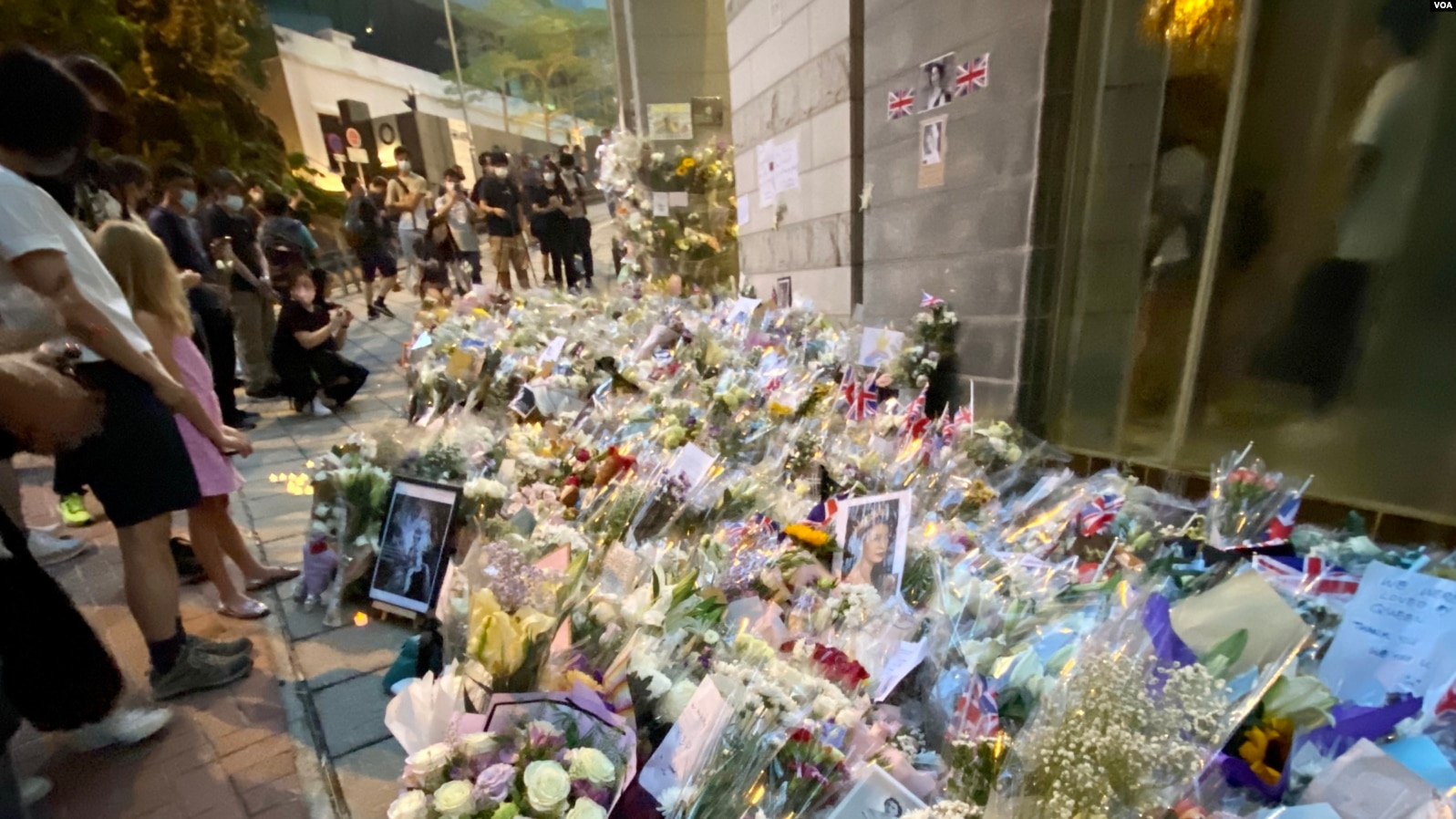
Tributes left outside the British Consulate in Hong Kong

- Hong Kong Chief Executive John Lee expressed his condolences in a statement: "On behalf of the people and the Government of the Hong Kong Special Administrative Region, it is with great sadness that I express our profound condolences on the passing of Her Majesty Queen Elizabeth II of the United Kingdom. Having reigned for 70 years, she was the longest reigning monarch of the United Kingdom. She was greatly respected, admired and praised by the British people. We send our deepest condolences to the people of the United Kingdom during this time of national mourning and reflection." Over 2,500 people queued for up to 3 hours outside the British Consulate General to lay flowers and pay tribute to the Queen, with the queue itself being around 500 metres long.
- Macau Chief Executive Ho Iat Seng also expressed his condolences in a statement, saying, "Queen Elizabeth II, greatly respected and loved by the people of the United Kingdom, dedicated her entire life to her country and her people. On behalf of the Macao SAR Government, and on its behalf, the Chief Executive expresses his deep dismay at the death of Queen Elizabeth II and expresses his most sincere condolences to the King of the United Kingdom, Charles III, and to the royal family and people of UK."
- The president of Georgia Salome Zourabichvili tweeted that "Her Majesty Queen Elizabeth II has lived a life of dedication to her people, her nation and the Commonwealth" and offered her condolences to the Royal Family.
  - Irakli Garibashvili, Prime Minister of Georgia, stated in his condolence message that "Her Majesty, Queen Elizabeth II was a leader who led the nation throughout the decades, being respected, adored and will be well-remembered by the generations ahead."
  - Chairperson of the Parliament of Georgia, Shalva Papuashvili, paid a tribute to the Queen on Twitter stating that her legacy would define "many more decades to come".
- President of Indonesia Joko Widodo expressed his condolences, writing on Twitter that "I am deeply saddened by the passing of Queen Elizabeth II, a widely admired and beloved queen. My deepest sympathy and heartfelt condolences to the Royal Family, the government, and the people of the UK."
  - Member of the People's Representative Council of the Republic of Indonesia Fadli Zon sent his condolences and released a statement on his Twitter: "Rest in peace (RIP) for Queen Elizabeth II, 1 Queen 15 prime ministers, 70 years reigned as a beacon of stability through the toughest times in history. She dedicated her life with an unwavering sense of responsibility, may selflessness, courage and its toughness is an inspiration for future leaders," he said.
  - Former Indonesian president Susilo Bambang Yudhoyono expressed his condolences on his Twitter.
  - Minister of Foreign Affairs, Retno Marsudi, offered her condolences to Owen Jenkins, the British ambassador to Indonesia. A book of condolences was opened for Indonesians to write their condolences.
- It was noted that the government leadership of Iran made no official statement on the Queen's death. It was also noted that many Iranians supporting Mohammad Khatami fondly remembered the Queen and photos of the Queen were posted on Khatami's Instagram account. Iranian state and hardline media denounced her as a "queen of tricksters" who left a "bloody legacy to humanity".
- President of Iraq Barham Salih sent his condolences to the Royal Family. According to him, "I feel deeply saddened by the death of Her Majesty Queen Elizabeth II. I offer my deepest condolences to the royal family and the people of the United Kingdom. Queen Elizabeth will be remembered as a great symbol of history."
- President of Israel Isaac Herzog said on his official Facebook page: "As the 11th President of Israel during Her Majesty's long reign, and on behalf of the whole State and people of Israel, I express my condolences to The Royal Family, to the King and the Queen Consort, to the people of the United Kingdom, and to all nations of the Commonwealth. Throughout her long and momentous reign, the world changed dramatically, while the Queen remained an icon of stable, responsible leadership, and a beacon of morality, humanity and patriotism."
  - Prime Minister of Israel Yair Lapid said a statement on his official social media accounts: "On behalf of the Government and people of Israel, I send my condolences to the Royal Family and the people of the United Kingdom on the death of Her Majesty Queen Elizabeth II. She leaves behind an unparalleled legacy of leadership and service. May her memory be for a blessing."
  - Leader of the Opposition Benjamin Netanyahu wrote on Twitter, "My wife Sara and I, along with all the people of Israel, send our condolences to the people of Britain and to the royal family on the passing of Queen Elizabeth II. She was a legendary sovereign, a beacon of integrity and a steward of a second Elizabethan age which will be remembered down the centuries. May her memory be blessed."

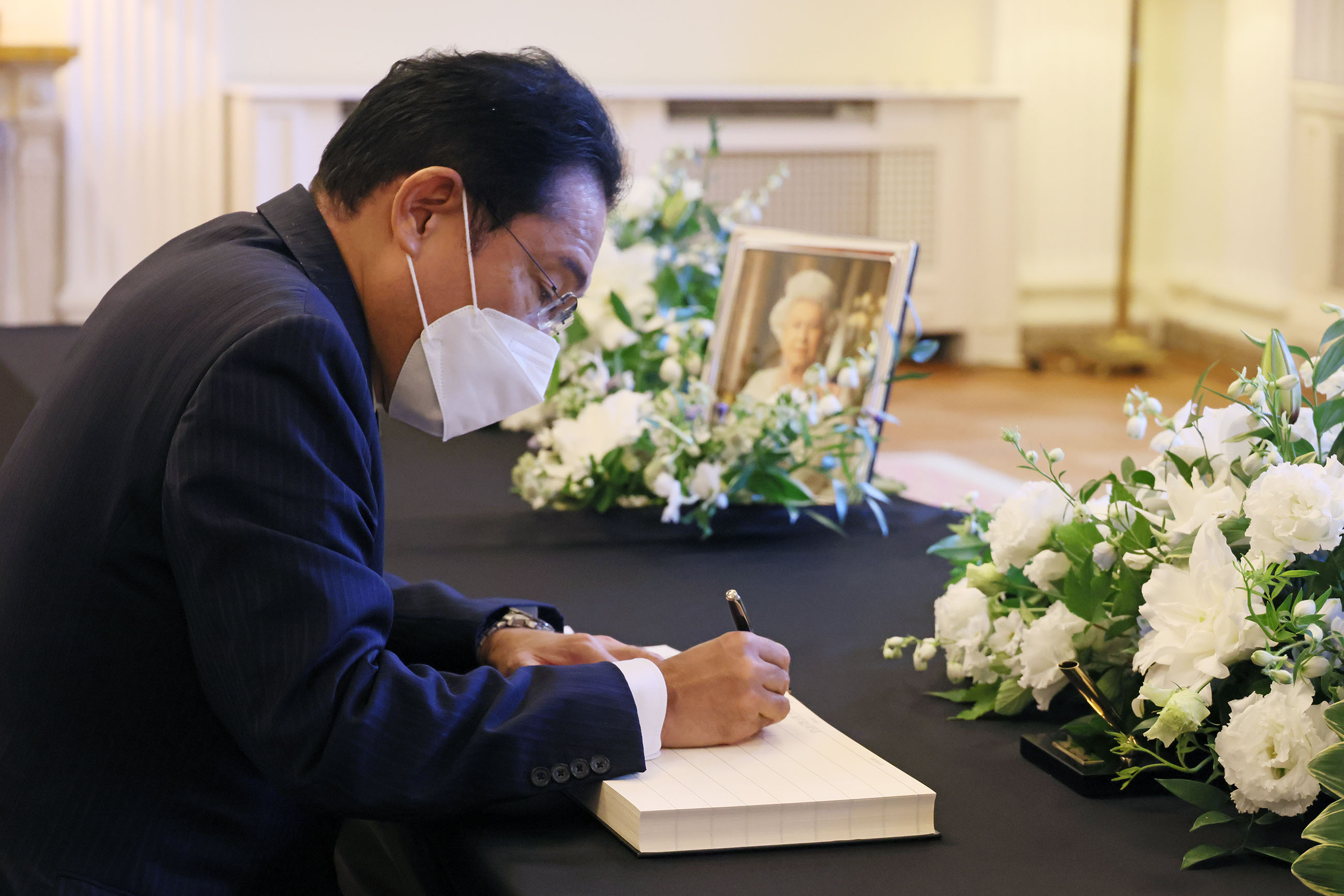
Fumio Kishida signing a book of condolence at the British Embassy in Tokyo

- Prime Minister of Japan Fumio Kishida said that Queen Elizabeth made a "great contribution" towards strengthening Japan's ties with Britain, adding that her death was a big loss for the international community. Kishida added that "The government of Japan expresses its heartfelt condolences to the British royal family, the British government and the British people."
- President of Kazakhstan Kassym-Jomart Tokayev sent a telegram of condolences to King Charles III, which states "Under her wise stewardship, graciousness and inspiring guidance, the United Kingdom has been consistently progressing towards yet more stable, diverse and prosperous society, while being a frontrunner in promoting international security and sustainable development. I am convinced that her remarkable integrity, dignity and incredible achievements will continue inspiring millions of people around the world, and her tremendous legacy will live on in the hearts and minds of the younger generations."
- The Cabinet of Kuwait sent its condolences to King Charles III, and issued a decree to fly the flag of Kuwait at half-mast for three days.
- President of Kyrgyzstan Sadyr Japarov offered his condolences to King Charles III, stating that "Her Majesty Queen Elizabeth II will always remain a model of commitment to the state interests of Great Britain and care about her people."
- President of Laos and General Secretary of the Lao People's Revolutionary Party Thongloun Sisoulith sent condolences to King Charles III stating "The passing of Queen Elizabeth II is a great loss for the Royal Family, the United Kingdom, and the British Empire, as well as the British people because the Queen was a respected mother and a great leader who dedicated her life to serving the British people and bettering the lives of her people for over 70 years."
  - Prime Minister of Laos Phankham Viphavanh also sent his condolences stating "On behalf of the Government of the Lao People's Democratic Republic and on my own behalf, I would like to express my sincere condolences to His Highness and through His Highness to the Royal Family, as well as all the British people, on this occasion."
- In a statement, Lebanese president Michel Aoun said, "We lost an international reference" "and someone we learn from respect, values, and national duty, someone who supports Lebanon's unity and territorial integrity. This loss afflicted the Lebanese, who knew her throughout her long reign; she was always by their side, especially in the dire situation that Lebanon went through." Three days of mourning were declared through 9–11 September with a fourth day for the day of the funeral. Flags were flown at half staff.
- President of Mongolia Ukhnaagiin Khürelsükh visited the British Embassy in Ulaanbaatar, where he signed the condolence book stating "Her Majesty was a steadying presence and a symbol of unity to Britain, the Commonwealth, and the whole world for seventy years of historic changes, development as well as times of difficulties. Her solemn legacy will forever remain in our hearts."
  - In a statement, former president of Mongolia Tsakhiagiin Elbegdorj said, "Queen Elizabeth has ascended to heaven. Her queen's heart has been beating for 75 years since she announced that she will work for others. Leading the state is a very prestigious and difficult job. The queen has carried this burden for 70 years. May her majesty rest in peace. May King Charles live long."
- Acting president Duwa Lashi La of NUG expressed his condolences, writing on Twitter that "I am very sadden to hear about the passing of Her Majesty the Queen Elizabeth II. Our deepest condolences to @RoyalFamily and the people of the UK. We will remember the Queen's wisdom and compassion."
  - Minister of Foreign Affairs Zin Mar Aung of NUG expressed her condolences on her official Twitter that "I'm deeply saddened by the news of the passing of Her Majesty Queen Elizabeth II. On behalf of @NUGMyanmar and the people of Myanmar, I extend our deepest sympathies to the Royal Family and the people of the United Kingdom and the Commonwealth."
- Prime Minister of Nepal, Sher Bahadur Deuba, tweeted: "It is with great sadness I have received the news of her passing away. Queen Elizabeth II distinguished herself with duty, honour and service. The Queen is fondly remembered in Nepal for her two important state visits in 1961 and 1986." The country observed three days of mourning from 10 September in honour of the Queen and the national flag was flown at half-mast in government offices and Nepalese embassies and missions abroad.
- President of the State of Palestine Mahmoud Abbas offered condolences to King Charles on the death of his mother, saying, "We have received with great sorrow the news about the passing of Her Majesty, Queen Elizabeth II of the United Kingdom. Her life was dedicated to the service of her country and people. For decades, she meticulously carried out her royal duties, leaving behind a rich legacy that will be engraved in the hearts and minds of coming generations."
- President of the Philippines Bongbong Marcos wrote on his official Facebook page, in a statement: "It is with profound sadness that we receive the news of the passing of Her Majesty Queen Elizabeth II in Balmoral Castle yesterday evening. She exemplified to the world a true monarch's great dignity, commitment to duty, and devotion to all those in her realm. We, together with many Filipinos living and working in England, though not subjects of the Queen, have found ourselves having developed a great sense of affection for her as a Queen, as mother, and as a grandmother. The world has lost a true figure of majesty in what she demonstrated throughout her life and throughout her reign as Queen." In addition, President Marcos, First Lady Liza Araneta Marcos along with Ilocos Norte's 1st district representative Sandro Marcos also visited the Embassy of the United Kingdom in Taguig, Manila, where they met with British ambassador Laure Beaufils, and signed a condolence book in honour of the Queen.
  - Several members of both houses of Congress of the Philippines and its legislative leaders (including Philippine Senate president Migz Zubiri, Philippine Senate Minority Floor Leader Koko Pimentel, Philippine House Speaker Martin Romualdez, as well as former Philippine president and Philippine House Senior Deputy Speaker Gloria Macapagal Arroyo; among others) also gave tributes, and offered statement of condolences and prayers on social media towards to the Royal Family, the British people and the British government on Queen Elizabeth II's death.
- President of South Korea Yoon Suk Yeol posted his condolences on Twitter, stating that "She had a strong belief in the cause of human freedom and left great legacies of dignity" and "Her kind heart and good deeds will remain in our memories."
  - South Korean Prime Minister Han Duck-soo and South Korean Speaker Kim Jin-pyo also expressed their condolences to the royal family.
  - Former South Korean President Moon Jae-in expressed his condolences on his Twitter account.
- President of the Republic of China (Taiwan) Tsai Ing-wen extended her condolences to the Royal Family, people of the UK and Commonwealth on Twitter, stating that "Taiwan remembers and celebrates her life of leadership and service, which set an example for people around the world."
- President of Tajikistan Emomali Rahmon sent a telegram to King Charles III, saying: "It is with deep sadness that we heard the news of the demise of Her Majesty Elizabeth II, Queen of the United Kingdom of Great Britain and Northern Ireland. Her Majesty Elizabeth II, with her continuous activity as Queen of the United Kingdom, determined the nature and content of an important era in the development of the country, through which she gained a great prestige and respect in the international arena. ... Expressing my sincere condolences in connection with this heavy loss, I wish you, Your Majesty, all your relatives and friends, as well as the friendly people of the United Kingdom of Great Britain and Northern Ireland, fortitude and good patience."
- Acting prime minister of Thailand Prawit Wongsuwon ordered all government agencies to lower their flags to half-mast for three days starting from 9 September.
  - Anucha Burapachaisri, Deputy Secretary-General to the Prime Minister for Political Affairs acting as a spokesman for the Prime Minister's Office, issued a statement on the following afternoon: "The Thai government mourns the passing of Her Majesty Queen Elizabeth II, who is revered and admired around the world."
- President of Timor-Leste José Ramos-Horta, during a state visit to Canberra expressed his condolences in a statement: "It is a loss for the British People and for the Commonwealth. An extraordinary woman, symbol of the United Kingdom, and who served her country for 70 years. May her soul rest in peace alongside her late husband, Duke of Edinburgh". Ramos-Horta cancelled a lecture he was scheduled to give at the Lowy Institute out of respect for Elizabeth II's passing.
  - Prime Minister Taur Matan Ruak sent his condolences in a statement made on the official site of East Timor's Government.
- President of Turkmenistan Serdar Berdimuhamedow extended his condolences to King Charles III and Liz Truss stating that "The life journey of Queen Elizabeth II, her noble activities and the valuable legacy she left behind will forever remain in the memory of present and future generations." He also conveyed words of sympathy and support to King Charles III, the Royal Family and the people of the UK.
- President of Uzbekistan Shavkat Mirziyoyev expressed his condolences in a letter stating that "She was a great statesperson, the symbol of the country's integrity and rapid development for more than 70 years. She made an incomparable contribution to the Kingdom making it one of the leading countries in the global economy and politics, increasing its reputation in the international arena in every way." He also offered words of comfort to the King Charles III, members of the Royal Family and the people of the UK, and wished for patience and fortitude.
- Vietnamese president Nguyễn Xuân Phúc offered his condolences to King Charles III. In addition, Prime Minister Phạm Minh Chính extended his condolences to British prime minister Liz Truss, and National Assembly chairman Vương Đình Huệ did the same to Speaker of the House of Lords John McFall and Speaker of the House of Commons Lindsay Hoyle.
- Chairman of the Presidential Leadership Council of Yemen Rashad al-Alimi congratulated Charles III on his accession to the throne and wished him success as king. He also signed a condolence book at the British Embassy in Riyadh, "describing Her Majesty as an example for wisdom, competence and dedication to serve her own country and nation over the past seven decades."

==== Europe ====
- Prime Minister of Albania Edi Rama posted on his Facebook account the Queen's photo, with the caption "Goodbye Queen." The president of Albania, Bajram Begaj, said in a tweet "Heartfelt condolences to @RoyalFamily & the people of Great Britain and Commonwealth on the passing of HM #QueenElisabethII. She was a Monarch with a kind heart, immense strength and courage and will always be remembered with great respect and admiration! May the Queen rest in peace!".
  - Speaker of the Parliament of Albania, Lindita Nikolla said, "the death of Her Majesty, Queen Elizabeth II, is sad news not only for the people of the United Kingdom, but for all mankind. A whole life in the service of the nation, the state and the citizens! Queen Elizabeth II, the unifier of the nation, widely accepted as a symbol of the stability of the United Kingdom and the world, helped her country through major changes over seven decades, to strengthen national identity, increase geopolitical influence and international position. Rest in peace, Your Majesty!"
- Prime Minister of Andorra Xavier Espot Zamora tweeted: "For those of us who are dedicated to public service, Elizabeth II will always be a model of a sense of duty, selflessness and respect for institutions. Today the feelings of Andorrans are with the British people and with those of all the countries of which she was head of state."
  - Archbishop Joan Enric Vives i Sicília, Bishop of Urgell and Co-Prince of Andorra (along with the president of France) said in a message of condolence: "On hearing the sad news of the death of Her Majesty the beloved Queen Elizabeth II, and mother of Your Majesty, I am sending you on my own behalf, that of the Government of the Principality of Andorra and that of the Institutions and the Andorran People, our deepest condolences and our prayers for her eternal rest, in the peace of God in whom she has always believed and trusted. Please convey to the entire Royal Family, your Government and the People of the United Kingdom and Northern Ireland our expression of sympathy and solidarity."
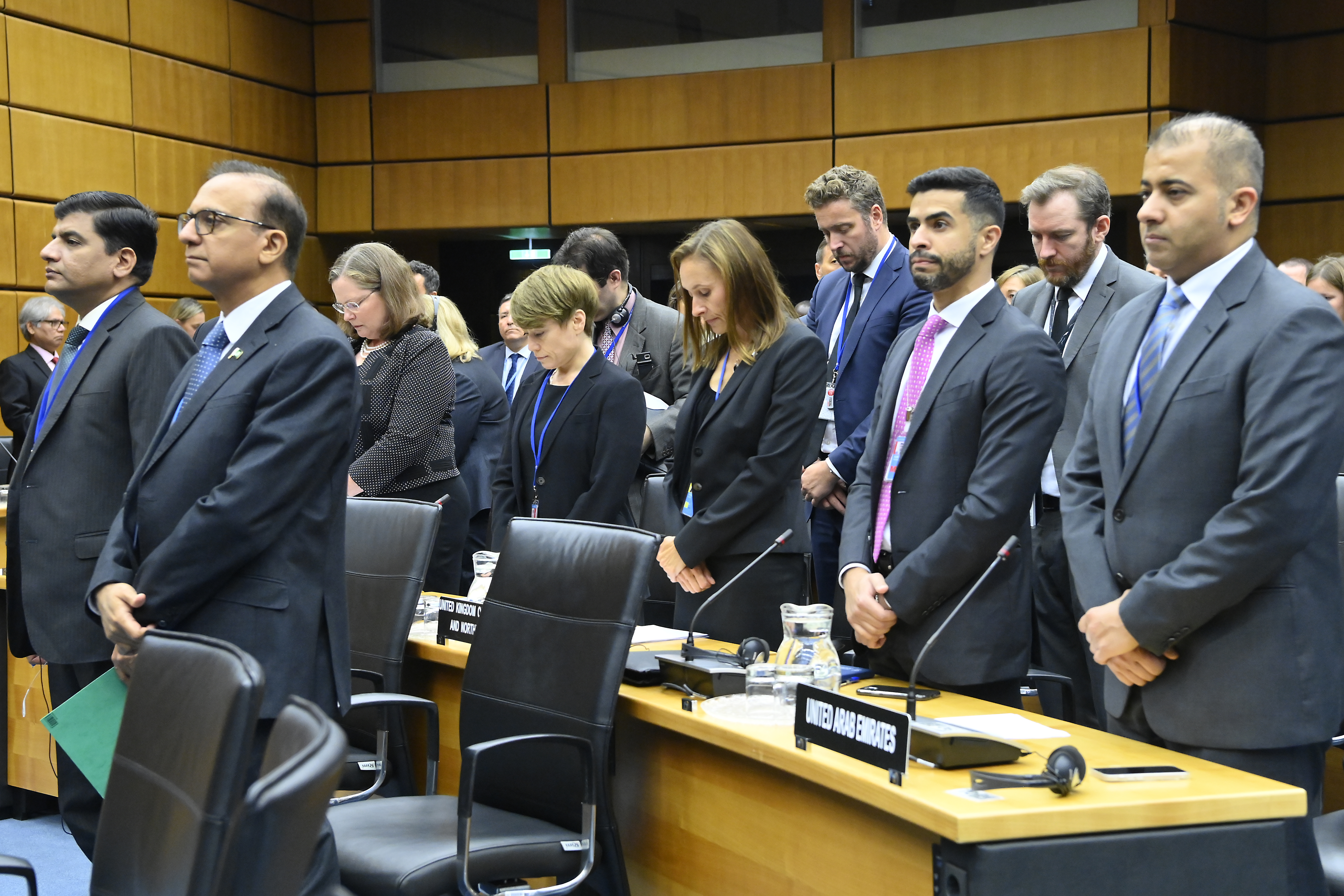
    A moment of silence in memory of the Queen being observed at the opening of the 1637th Board of Governors at the Agency headquarters in Vienna, Austria on 12 September
- Chancellor of Austria Karl Nehammer tweeted: "With the death of Queen Elizabeth II, a historic figure passes away and with her, a 70-year era comes to an end, in which she stood for stability through the decades until today. My heartfelt condolences to the family & people of the United Kingdom." He also ordered the flag at the Federal Chancellery to be lowered to half-mast.
  - The President of Austria, Alexander Van der Bellen, released an official statement in which he said: "I salute the Queen, her life's work for the United Kingdom and the Commonwealth. On behalf of the Republic of Austria and all the people who live here, I would like to extend my deepest condolences and heartfelt sympathy to His Majesty King Charles III. and all the members of the Royal Family as well as to the people of the United Kingdom and the Commonwealth."
- President of Belarus Alexander Lukashenko wrote that: "Her Majesty's seventy-year reign has been a symbol of true service to her people, and a guarantee of the stability and prosperity of the United Kingdom and the Commonwealth realms for many years. She linked generations who proudly and with dignity overcame the most difficult challenges. Even in the most difficult times Elizabeth II's statesmanship and authority always made it possible to rise above the political situation. The Republic of Belarus deeply respects and responsibly follows Her Majesty's moral commandment about no alternative to the further progress of mankind on the way of good-neighborliness and mercy."
  - Belarusian opposition leader Sviatlana Tsikhanouskaya wrote on Twitter that the Queen "stood firm & true through the most turbulent of times. Her resilience & service remain inspirational. Today, we bow our heads in honor of Queen Elizabeth II & her remarkable life."
- Prime Minister of Belgium Alexander De Croo tweeted: "Belgium sends its condolences to the British Royal Family and to the British people. May HRH Queen Elizabeth II Rest In Peace. For over 70 years, she was a beacon of stability and dignity for the British people."
- Chairman of the Presidency of Bosnia and Herzegovina Šefik Džaferović offered his condolences stating: "I offer my sincere condolences to the Royal Family, the authorities and the people of the United Kingdom of Great Britain and Northern Ireland. I am with you in thoughts and prayers."
- President of Bulgaria Rumen Radev wrote a letter of condolences to Charles III saying: "With her passing, Britain and the world lose a remarkable stateswoman whose life and deeds marked an entire era."
- Prime Minister of Croatia Andrej Plenković released a statement stating: "Her Majesty Queen Elizabeth II was a source of inspiration to generations. Her example of leadership and service to her nation will remain an everlasting testament. I offer my most sincere condolences to the Royal Family and to the British people."
- Mette Frederiksen, the Prime Minister of Denmark, wrote: "I am saddened by the passing of Her Majesty Queen Elizabeth II. Her Majesty the Queen was a unifying figure for her nation and the world. She provided a sense of stability during changing times. Our thoughts are with The Royal Family and the people of the United Kingdom, the Realms and the Commonwealth. I send the heartfelt condolences of my Government and the people of Denmark to PM Liz Truss"
- Miloš Zeman, the president of the Czech Republic, expressed his "deep sadness", stating that "her devoted service to monarchy, her immense humility and nobility will remain forever in our hearts."
  - Prime Minister of the Czech Republic Petr Fiala stated: "I am deeply saddened by the death of Her Majesty the Queen, Elizabeth II. Sending heartfelt and sincere condolences to the Royal family and the British people and the people of the Commonwealth."
- Kaja Kallas, the Prime Minister of Estonia, wrote that she was profoundly saddened of the death of Queen Elizabeth and Estonia mourns with her people and the Royal Family. She added that "Her sense of service and dedication to public duty were unparalleled. It's the end of an era but her legend will live on and inspire."

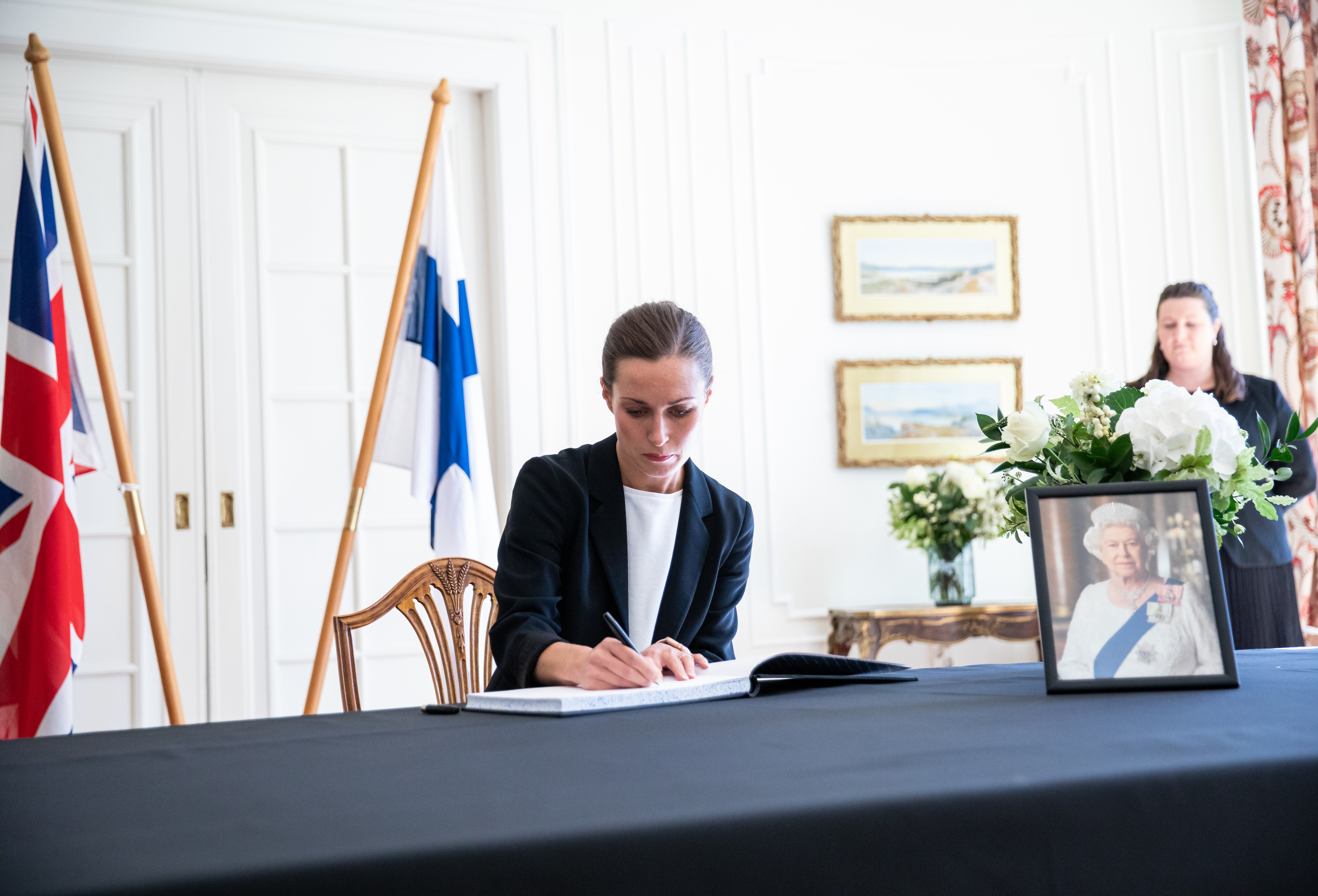
Prime Minister of Finland Sanna Marin signing the book of condolences at the British Embassy, Helsinki, 9 September

- Sauli Niinistö, the president of Finland, wrote that he was deeply saddened of the news of the Queen's death. Prime Minister Sanna Marin offered her condolences to the British Royal family and the peoples of the United Kingdom and the Commonwealth.
- French president Emmanuel Macron said: "She held a special status in France and a special place in the hearts of the French people. No foreign sovereign has climbed the stairs of the Élysée Palace more often than she, who honoured France with six state visits and met each of its presidents. For her, French was not a mere relic of Norman ancestry that persisted in so many customs, but an intimate, cherished language. The Queen of sixteen kingdoms loved France, which loved her back."
  - Prime Minister Élisabeth Borne stated that "Queen Elizabeth II had and will keep a special place in the hearts of the French. Our country joins in the sorrow of the Royal Family and the grief of the British people."
  - President of the Corsican Assembly Marie-Antoinette Maupertuis stated that "Our island was honoured in 1956 to welcome Elizabeth II. A book by Boswell, signed by Pasquale Paoli, was offered to him. One of the most beautiful pages in our history could then be presented to this woman who will have forever marked her country and Europe."
- German President Frank-Walter Steinmeier stated during a speech at Bellevue Palace that "her natural authority, her immense experience, her exemplary performance of duty will remain in our living memory." He added that after World War II, "the hand of reconciliation was also the hand of the Queen."
  - German Chancellor Olaf Scholz said that the queen "was a role model and inspiration for millions, also here in Germany. Her commitment to German-British reconciliation after the horrors of World War II will remain unforgotten. She will be missed, not least her wonderful humour."
  - Former German Chancellor Angela Merkel said of the Queen, "Her death marks the end of an era. There are no words that can even come close to honouring the outstanding importance of this Queen, her sense of duty, her moral integrity, her devotion and her dignity over seven decades for the United Kingdom, for Europe and for the world."
  - The German Bundestag interrupted its debate at 19:38 local time to honour the late British Queen Elizabeth II in a minute of remembrance. The parliamentarians rose from their seats. On 9 September, flags were at halfmast in North Rhine-Westphalia, Saxony and Berlin.
- Katerina Sakellaropoulou, President of Greece, and Prime Minister Kyriakos Mitsotakis, offered their condolences over Twitter, with Sakellaropoulou calling her "a true pillar of her country", who "has been rewarded with love and respect". Mitsotakis stated that her "duty, service, and dedication she demonstrated throughout her reign was not just exemplary but extraordinary."
- The president of Hungary, Katalin Novák stated on her official Facebook account: "We say goodbye to the woman, the mother, the queen, the European head of state! I am deeply saddened to learn of the death of Queen Elizabeth II, and I extend my sincere condolences to the members of the Royal Family. It is with sadness and respect that we bid farewell to one of the most influential figures in 20th century British and European history. We Hungarians have learned much in standing up for nation and family from Queen Elizabeth II. We will cherish Her Majesty's memory in our hearts."
  - Prime Minister, Viktor Orbán posted a short Hungarian language message on his Facebook account, that translates: "God rest Queen Elizabeth II!" The Queen's attached photo had the English caption: "May you rest in peace, Your Majesty!"
- The President of Iceland Guðni Th. Jóhannesson tweeted: "The greatest monarch of our times has passed away. H.M. Queen Elizabeth II will always be remembered and admired for her dignity and selfless devotion. On behalf of all Icelanders I send deep condolences to the Royal Family, the people of the United Kingdom and the Commonwealth."
- The President of Ireland Michael D. Higgins in a statement said: "it is with profound regret and deep personal sadness" that he learned of her death, and expressed his "heartfelt sympathy" to the royal family on their loss. "Her personal commitment to her role and extraordinary sense of duty were the hallmarks of her period as queen, which will hold a unique place in British history."
  - Taoiseach Micheál Martin also expressed condolences on behalf of the Irish government, saying: "On behalf of the Government of Ireland, I would like to convey my deepest sympathy to His Majesty King Charles, the Royal Family, the UK Government and the British people on the loss of their beloved monarch, Her Majesty Queen Elizabeth. The Queen's reign was one of historic duration, immense consequence and a focus of respect and admiration around the world. Her dedication to duty and public service were self-evident and her wisdom and experience truly unique. The Queen's passing is indeed the end of an era. Her State Visit to Ireland in 2011 marked a crucial step in the normalisation of relations with our nearest neighbour. That visit was a great success, largely because of the many gracious gestures and warm remarks made by the Queen during her time in Ireland." Tánaiste Leo Varadkar joined in paying tribute. The Leader of the Opposition and President of Sinn Féin, Mary Lou McDonald has also expressed her condolences to the royal family and paid her own tribute to the late queen.
- Sergio Mattarella, the President of Italy, said in an official statement: "On the occasion of the passing of Queen Elizabeth II, I send to Your Majesty, to the royal family and to all the citizens of the United Kingdom the most heartfelt condolences of the Italian Republic and my own. An outstanding figure enters history. She will be remembered for her authoritative wisdom and high sense of responsibility, expressed above all in the generosity of spirit with which she devoted her long life to the service of the British people and the wider Commonwealth family."
  - Italian Prime Minister Mario Draghi stated in his condolence message that "Queen Elizabeth has been an absolute protagonist of world history for the past seventy years. She represented the United Kingdom and the Commonwealth with balance, wisdom, respect for institutions and for democracy. She has been the most beloved symbol of her country and has garnered respect, affection, liking all over the world. She guaranteed stability in times of crisis and has been able to keep alive the value of tradition in a society in constant and profound evolution" and that "her spirit of service, her dedication to the United Kingdom and the Commonwealth, the deep dignity with which she held her office for such a long time have been a relentless source of admiration for generations."
- Prime Minister of Kosovo Albin Kurti in a tweet said "The people of Kosova and I offer our deepest condolences to the Royal Family and British people on the passing of Her Majesty the Queen Elizabeth II. Her dedication, hard work and humility are an inspiration to us all, especially in these trying times. Rest in Peace."
- President of Latvia Egils Levits published his condolences to Royal Family and people of the UK in Twitter stating that the "Whole generations have grown up during her rule and today feel great sadness at this loss."
  - Prime Minister of Latvia Krišjānis Kariņš also offered his condolences stating that "Her Majesty was the most inspiring leader who served people with remarkable dedication."
- Liechtenstein prime minister Daniel Risch offered his condolences on Twitter, stating "May her sense of duty and devotion to her country be remembered outside the UK." He signed a book of condolences at the town hall in Vaduz on 15 September.
  - Minister of Foreign Affairs, Education and Sport, Dominique Hasler, offered her condolences on Twitter, stating that the Queen has "actively shaped the last 70 years of world history" and was "a constant in an ever-changing world."
- Gitanas Nausėda, the president of Lithuania offered his condolences on Twitter stating that her "Remarkable 70 years of reign & devotion to humanitarian causes will never be forgotten."
- Xavier Bettel, the prime minister of Luxembourg, said in his official Twitter account: "Queen Elizabeth II guided Great Britain over seven decades and through many challenges. Her steady leadership, her capacity to inspire hope and her dedication to stability and peace will be greatly missed. I extend my deepest sympathy to the Royal Family and the British people."
- Moldovan president Maia Sandu offered her condolences and said in her Twitter account that the Queen's "remarkable lifetime service, inspiring leadership & dedication for peace have defined generations."
  - Prime Minister Natalia Gavrilița offered her condolences and said in her Twitter account that the Queen will "forever remain an inspiration and an example to us all for her spirit of duty towards her people and country."
- Milo Đukanović, the president of Montenegro, said in his official Twitter account: "On behalf of Montenegrin citizens and in my own name I hereby extend sincere condolences to the Royal Family, UK Government, and all citizens of the United Kingdom on the death of Her Majesty the Queen Elizabeth II. Montenegro shares sorrow and pain for the passing of Queen Elisabeth II, whose several-decades-long reign remains one of the most valuable parts of the world historic heritage. Her Majesty's personality and deeds marked the modern era, and she was a part of the lives of people in her Kingdom, but also of millions of people around the world who deeply respected her."
- Jonas Gahr Støre, the Prime Minister of Norway, offered his condolences and highlighted the end of her reign as the end of a long and historic era and life.
- Mark Rutte, the Prime Minister of the Netherlands, wrote in a tweet that: "During her exceptionally long reign, she was a beacon of calm and stability her for country and the world, even at the moments of the greatest historical upheaval."
  - The Senate and House of Representatives commemorated Elizabeth II during their plenary meetings with speeches by their presidents and a minute of silence.
- Stevo Pendarovski, the president of North Macedonia, wrote in a letter of condolences to King Charles III that: "The Queen performed her service devotedly and tirelessly, demonstrating leadership even in the most difficult times. In the seven decades of her reign, generations grew and developed for whom the Queen was and remains a symbol of a leader who leads through empathy, with a vision, always ready to adapt the monarchy to the new dynamics of global trends, staying steadfastly focused on leading and representing her country in every part of the world."
- President of Northern Cyprus Ersin Tatar said: "It is with deep sadness and heartfelt sorrow that I have learned of the passing of your Mother, Her Majesty Queen Elizabeth II. I respectfully extend to Your Majesty in your bereavement and to all members of the Royal Family our deepest sympathies and sincere condolences on behalf of the Turkish Republic of Northern Cyprus and the Turkish Cypriot People."
- President of Poland Andrzej Duda, while on a diplomatic trip to Senegal, made an entry in a book of condolences at the British Embassy in Dakar. Earlier, he expressed his condolences to the Royal Family and all the British people on Twitter: "Her Majesty The Queen for decades she has been an embodiment of everything that makes Britain truly Great. She will be missed and remembered in Poland and all over the world."
- The president of Portugal, Marcelo Rebelo de Sousa, in a message posted on the Presidency's official website said: "It is with deep sadness and immense sorrow that I learnt of the death of Her Majesty Queen Elizabeth II. At this time of mourning and grief, I offer Your Majesty and the entire royal family, as well as all the British people, on behalf of the Portuguese people and on my own behalf, I offer my sincere condolences for the loss suffered."
  - The Portuguese government decreed a three-day national mourning period (18 to 20 September) in tribute to the queen of Portugal's "oldest ally" (Anglo-Portuguese Treaty of 1373).
- Klaus Iohannis, the president of Romania, wrote in a tweet that "Her Majesty's reign, which spanned seven decades, shaped modern history and is an exceptional symbol of loyalty and commitment to public service." and that "Romanians are with the British people and the Royal Family".
  - Prime Minister Nicolae Ciucă posted a photo of the Queen on Twitter while offering his condolences. "We stand with the British people and the Royal Family at this difficult time as Her Majesty Queen Elizabeth II of Great Britain and Northern Ireland passed on. My condolences to the British Royal Family! God rest her soul in peace!", he wrote.
- Vladimir Putin, the president of Russia, extended his "deepest condolences" on the death of Queen Elizabeth II. In a public letter to Charles III, he stated: "The most important events in the recent history of the United Kingdom are inextricably linked with the name of Her Majesty. For many decades, Elizabeth II rightfully enjoyed the love and respect of her subjects, as well as authority on the world stage. I wish you courage and perseverance in the face of this heavy, irreparable loss. I ask you to convey the words of sincere sympathy and support to the members of the royal family and all the people of Great Britain."
  - Kremlin spokesperson Dmitry Peskov told reporters in a conference call that the Russian people had "great respect" for Queen Elizabeth II and her "wisdom and authority". The spokesperson said that "such qualities are in very short supply on the international stage at the moment".
- Captains Regent of San Marino Oscar Mina and Paolo Rondelli of San Marino sent a message of condolence expressing "the senses of our deepest condolences, together with the most heartfelt and moved sympathy on the passing of Her Majesty Queen Elizabeth II" and that "we remember with admiration her untiring commitment, tenacity and high human testimony that will remain in the memory, not only of her People, but of all humanity. In this time of sorrow, she remains for all of us the example of a life unreservedly consecrated to the service of her country".
- Aleksandar Vučić, the president of Serbia, wrote a telegram offering his condolences to the royal family and the people of the United Kingdom on the death of Queen Elizabeth II. In his telegram, he stated: "With her selfless public service, Her Majesty marked the modern history of the United Kingdom and the world, offering an example of how to carry the authority of leadership and carry out duties even in the toughest of times. Queen Elizabeth II faced every challenge wisely, unobtrusively yet decisively, above all taking into account the welfare of the nation, thereby earning the immense devotion of her followers and, likewise, her numerous admirers the world over. She was the backbone of her family and of the whole nation, which through the generations was devoted to her".
- The president of Slovakia, Zuzana Čaputová, tweeted: "My deepest condolences to the Royal Family, the people of the UK & the entire Commonwealth. Queen Elizabeth II's seven decades of steadfast leadership & dedication to the service to her country through many global changes have made her a role model & an inspiration for us all."

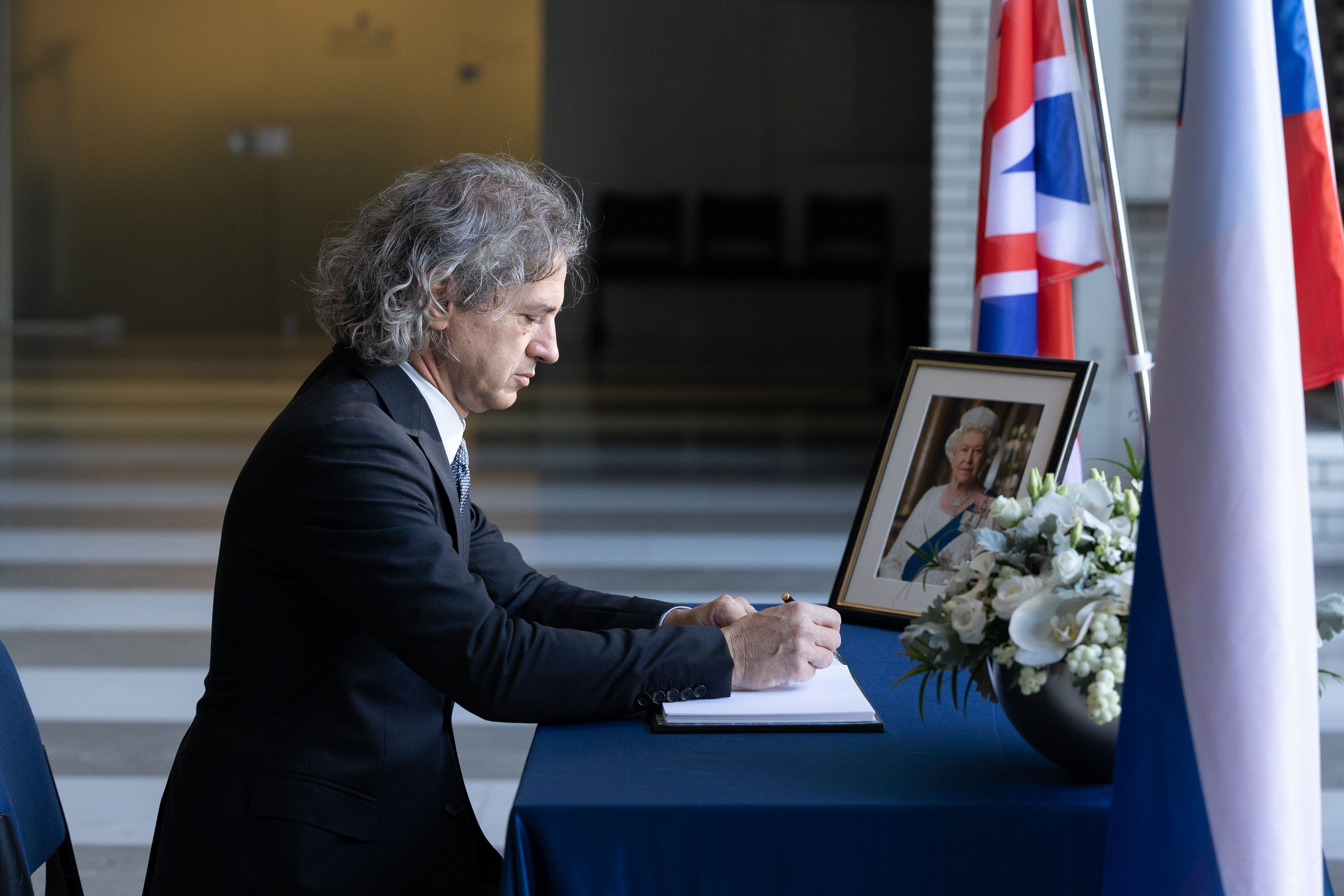
Prime Minister Robert Golob signing a book of condolence in Ljubljana, Slovenia

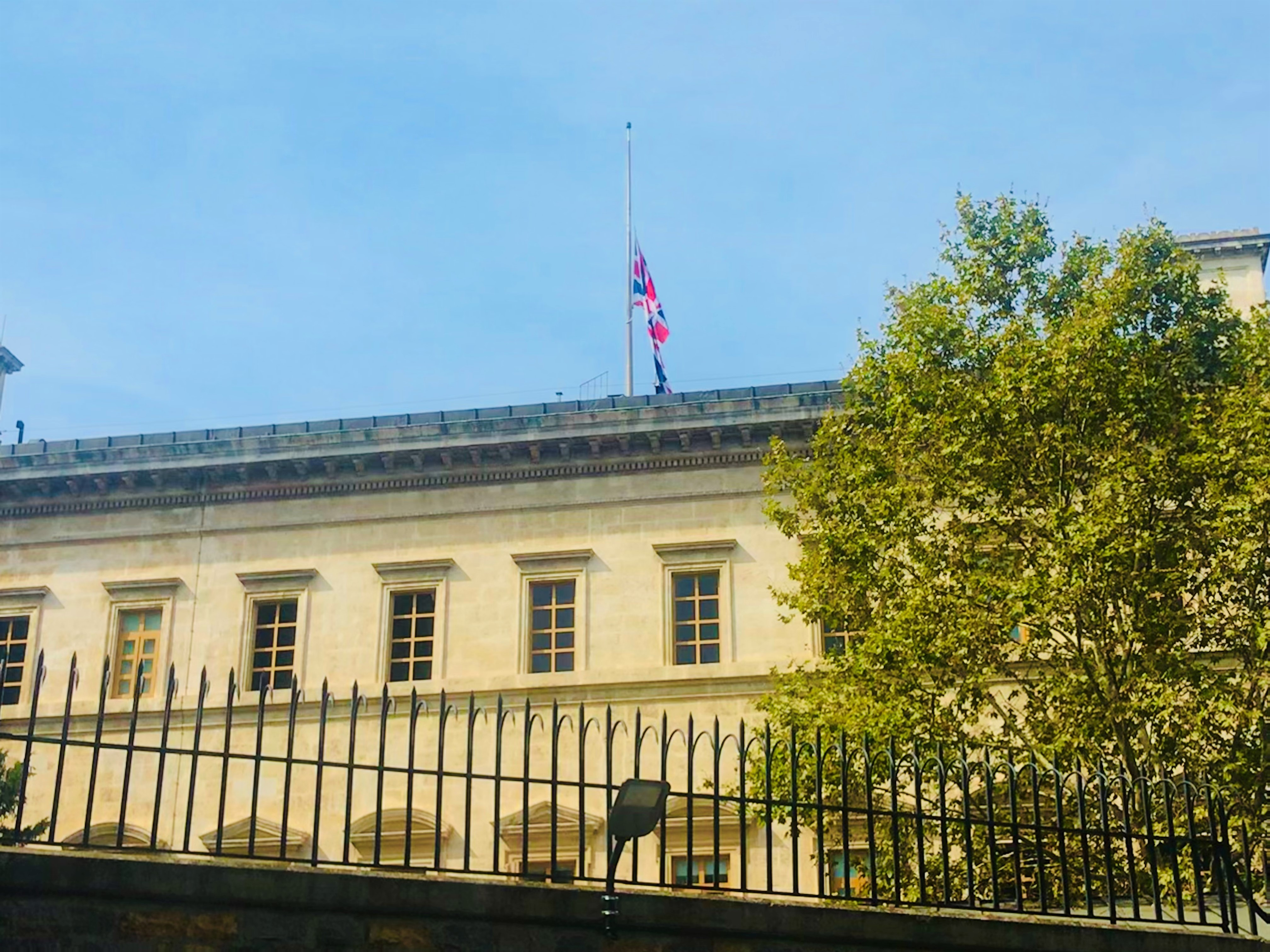
The Union Jack at half-mast in the British Consulate General in Istanbul

- Borut Pahor, the president of Slovenia, wrote a message given on his official website: "On my own behalf, on behalf of the Republic of Slovenia and all our people, I express my deep sadness and condolences on the death of Queen Elizabeth II. She ruled the United Kingdom but belonged to the whole world. Queen Elizabeth II left an indelible mark on European and world post-war history. With her, we are losing a historical figure who symbolized strength and trust. I am grateful to have had the opportunity to meet and admire her in person, most recently in early 2019 at Buckingham Palace during an official visit to the United Kingdom."
- Pedro Sánchez, the Prime Minister of Spain, expressed his condolences in Twitter, stating that Elizabeth II was "an author of the European history". "My condolences to the entire Royal Family, the government and the people of the United Kingdom and the Commonwealth on the passing of Queen Elizabeth II. A figure of global significance, witness and author of British and European history". Isabel Díaz Ayuso, President of the regional government of the Community of Madrid, where the capital city is located, declared three days of official mourning.
- Magdalena Andersson, the Prime Minister of Sweden wrote in an official statement: "I would like to express my sorrow at the news of the death of Her Majesty Queen Elizabeth II. For as long as most of us have been alive, she has been a cherished representative and symbol for United Kingdom and the head of state for the many countries of the Commonwealth. My thoughts today are naturally with the Queen's family and the British people, but her passing is a loss for us all."
- Ignazio Cassis, the president of the Swiss Confederation, wrote in a tweet: "Deeply saddened by the passing of HM #QueenElizabeth II. My sincere and heartfelt condolences to the Royal Family on behalf of the Federal Council and the people of Switzerland. She will be remembered as a woman of great strength & steady leadership."
- Recep Tayyip Erdoğan, the president of Turkey, said he was "saddened" to learn of Queen Elizabeth's death and sent his "deepest condolences to the royal family and the people and government of the United Kingdom".
  - Former president Abdullah Gül wrote on his official Twitter account: "It is with profound sadness that I learned the passing of Queen Elizabeth II. She devoted her whole life to the service of her country, will definitely find her place in the world history. In their times of sorrow, I convey my deepest condolences to the Royal family, the government and the entire people of the UK."
  - In a post on Twitter, main opposition leader Kemal Kılıçdaroğlu described the Queen as an "outstanding person of state and duty, who witnessed many historical events and transformations worldwide and worked until the last days of her life".
- Volodymyr Zelenskyy, the president of Ukraine, wrote in a tweet that "It is with deep sadness that we learned of the death of Her Majesty Queen Elizabeth II. On behalf of the Ukrainian people, we extend sincere condolences to the Royal Family, the entire United Kingdom, and the Commonwealth over this irreparable loss. Our thoughts and prayers are with you."
- On Facebook, the Sovereign Military Order of Malta expressed "its deepest condolences on the passing of Her Majesty Queen Elizabeth II. For over seventy years, she embodied the British nation's continuity and unity. She was highly admired and respected worldwide for her dignity, wisdom, grace, her strong commitment to the duty and attention to charitable works. The thoughts and prayers of the Sovereign Order of Malta are with King Charles III, the Royal Family, the entire United Kingdom, and the British Commonwealth."

==== North America ====
- The Ministry of Foreign Affairs and Worship of Costa Rica made a short statement of condolences from both the government and the Costa Rican people.
- First Secretary of the Communist Party of Cuba and President of Cuba Miguel Díaz-Canel made a statement on Twitter saying "It is with deep regret that we have learned of the passing of Her Majesty, Queen Elizabeth II. On behalf of the Cuban people and government, I express my deepest condolences to His Royal Highness, Prince Charles, the rest of the Royal Family, and the British people and government." In response to her death, Díaz-Canel declared a day of official mourning in Cuba for 9 September, to be observed from 6 am to 12 am midnight, with the flag of Cuba hoisted at half-mast in public buildings and military facilities.
- President of the Dominican Republic Luis Abinader tweeted that the reign of Elizabeth II "will be remembered for her dedication to democracy and the best causes."
- Salvadoran president Nayib Bukele stated on Twitter that he and his wife, Gabriela, expressed their "deepest sympathies" to the British people and the Royal Family. He added, "Her Majesty's legacy will always remain a touchstone for our shared values of empathy, solidarity and service."
- President of Guatemala Alejandro Giammattei tweeted that the queen's leadership "will remain a legacy for all humanity."
- Acting Prime Minister of Haiti Ariel Henry stated in a Twitter thread: "Queen Elizabeth II, the one who deeply marked the history of the United Kingdom, Europe and the whole world, has passed away. We would like to salute her deep commitment to the happiness of her people during 70 years of reign. We send our sincere condolences to the Royal Family, the British nation and the States of the Commonwealth who today mourn the passing of the most famous Monarch in history."
- Honduran Secretary of External Relations and International Cooperation Eduardo Enrique Reina tweeted: "Our sincere condolences to the people and government of the United Kingdom of Great Britain and Northern Ireland on the passing of HM Queen Elizabeth II, a message of solidarity to her family."
- The president of Mexico, Andrés Manuel López Obrador, made a statement on social media saying, "I send my condolences to the United Kingdom's people for the passing of Queen Elizabeth II, the British monarch and sovereign of 14 independent states. I also make this extensive to her family, friends, and members of the Royal House."
  - López Obrador's foreign secretary, Marcelo Ebrard, visited the British embassy in Mexico City, expressed the country's condolences, and signed a condolence book "Rest in Peace".
- Nicaraguan president Daniel Ortega and vice-president Rosario Murillo sent a joint message of condolence to Prime Minister Liz Truss sending their prayers for the Queen, "whose life meant so much to the British people."
- President of Panama Laurentino Cortizo sent "deepest condolences to the Royal Family, the British people and the Commonwealth on the death of Her Majesty Queen Elizabeth II, who honored Panama in a historic State Visit six decades ago. Peace to her soul. Her Majesty, Queen Elizabeth II (RIP), was an outstanding protagonist of contemporary history. Her personality and her character marked a transcendent legacy for her nation and her world. We honor her memory."

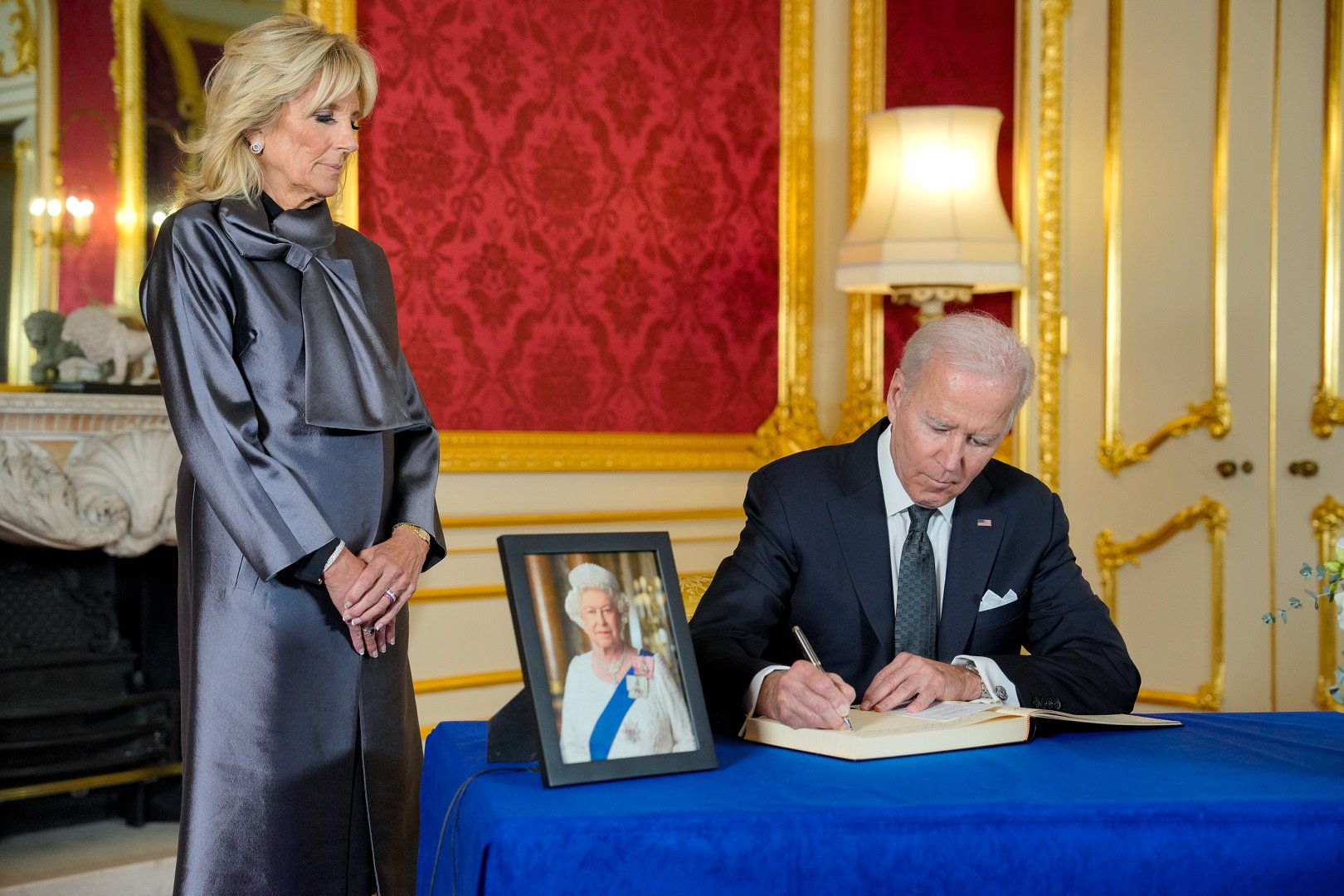
US President Joe Biden signing the book of condolence

- US president Joe Biden and First Lady Jill Biden, as well as US vice-president Kamala Harris and Second Gentleman Doug Emhoff, released respective statements of condolences on Twitter following the Queen's death. President Biden also ordered all federal and military facilities to lower their flags to half-staff until the day of the Queen's funeral. President and First Lady Biden also visited the Embassy of the United Kingdom in Washington, where they met with British ambassador Dame Karen Pierce and embassy staff, delivered flowers and were the first to sign a condolence book that the embassy had opened. In it, he wrote, "The American people mourn today with people throughout the United Kingdom and the Commonwealth. Elizabeth II defined an era. She led with enduring strength and dignity, devoting her whole life to serving her people. Jill and I will never forget meeting her and experiencing her warmth and kindness. She will be forever remembered." Secretary of State Antony Blinken was also among those who signed the condolence book.
  - Additional statements of condolences were issued by former US presidents Donald Trump, Barack Obama, George W. Bush, Bill Clinton, and Jimmy Carter, as well as former US first ladies Melania Trump, Michelle Obama, Laura Bush, Hillary Clinton, and Rosalynn Carter, respectively.
  - Former US vice-presidents Mike Pence and Al Gore also paid tribute on the Queen's death.
  - The majority and minority leaders of both houses of the US Congress – Speaker of the House of Representatives Nancy Pelosi, House Minority Leader Kevin McCarthy, Senate Majority Leader Chuck Schumer, and Senate Minority Leader Mitch McConnell – all released statements paying tribute to the Queen.
  - White House Press Secretary Karine Jean-Pierre was informed of the Queen's death during a press briefing; she briefly expressed condolences but said she didn't "want to get ahead of what the president is going to say".

==== Oceania ====
- On the Twitter account of the office of the president of the Federated States of Micronesia, a tweet was posted that read: "The Federated States of Micronesia expresses its heartfelt condolences for the loss of Her Royal Majesty, Queen Elizabeth II." The tweet also included a letter from the president David Panuelo to Prime Minister Liz Truss.
- Ambassador of Palau to the United Nations Ilana Seid expressed condolences "on behalf of the people and government of Palau".

==== South America ====
- The official Casa Rosada account on Twitter wrote: "The Argentine Government salutes and accompanies the British people and Government on the death of their Head of State, Queen Elizabeth II."
- The Ministry of Foreign Affairs of Bolivia issued an official statement in which it expressed condolences on behalf of the Bolivian government.

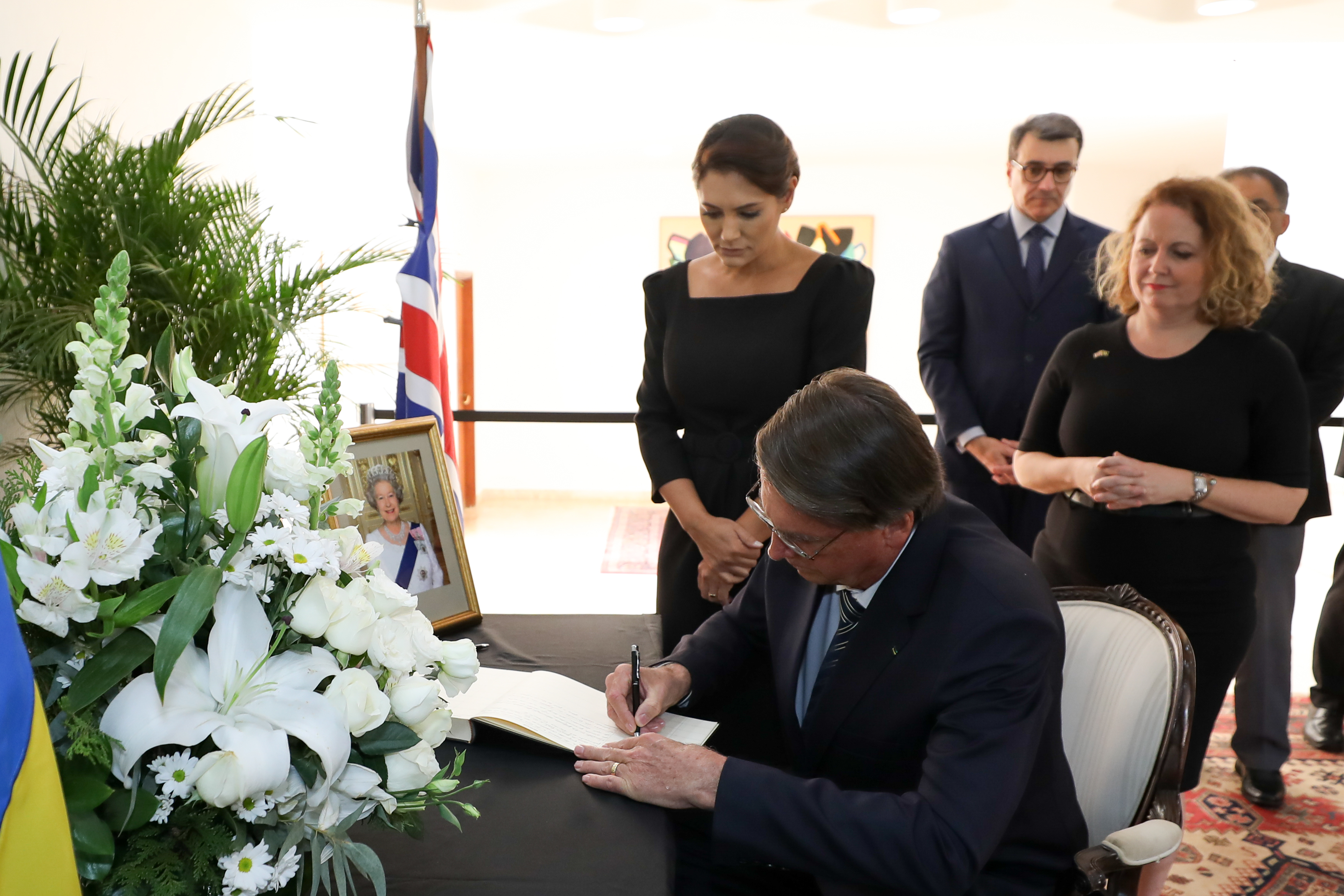
Brazilian president Jair Bolsonaro signing the book of condolence at the British Embassy in Brasília

- The president of Brazil, Jair Bolsonaro, paid his tributes to the Queen on Twitter and declared three days of national mourning in Brazil following her death.
- The Government of Chile's official account on Twitter wrote: "We extend our sincere condolences to the people of the United Kingdom and the Commonwealth of Nations, as well as to the British Royal Family,".
- The president of Colombia, Gustavo Petro, paid his tributes to the Queen on Twitter following her death. Former president Juan Manuel Santos expressed his condolences to the royal family, while former president Álvaro Uribe wrote on Twitter that the Queen "protected democracy for 70 years, [she] protected democracy for 70 years, helped consolidate the independence of former English colonies, and secured and maintained Commonwealth integration with sovereign states".
- The president of Ecuador, Guillermo Lasso, said on his Twitter account: "Dismayed at the death of Queen Elizabeth II, whose long life and dedication to the service of her people go down in history as an exemplary reign, I send my condolences to her children and grandchildren, the royal family, the Government and the people of the Kingdom United. Peace in her grave."
- The president of Paraguay, Mario Abdo Benítez, said on his Twitter account: "From the Republic of Paraguay, we convey our feelings of sorrow to the Royal Family, to the government and people of the United Kingdom on the passing of Queen Elizabeth II, who will always be remembered for her great vocation of service."
- Peruvian president Pedro Castillo wrote on his Twitter account that he and the Peruvian people sent condolences in behalf of the Royal Family. Furthermore, he added that "her legacy of her with a vocation for service and leadership will remain in history."
- The president of Suriname, Chan Santokhi, said on his Twitter account: "On behalf of the Surinamese people, condolences to the family and the entire British community on the loss. Also as Caribbean Community chairman, I express my deepest sadness on behalf of the entire CARICOM family at her passing. My thoughts are especially with the entire royal family."
- The Ministry of Foreign Relations of Uruguay released a statement in which it expressed, on behalf of the Government and the Uruguayan people, its "sincere condolences" for the death of the Queen. In addition, it declared that Uruguay joined "today in sorrow with the British people with our respect and tribute to a memorable political personality", who during her reign gave "stability to her country and faced global political and economic challenges" with a "firm commitment to the service of her nation".
- President of Venezuela Nicolás Maduro sent condolences via his Twitter account, roughly translating to: "The Bolivarian Republic of Venezuela mourns the loss of Queen Elizabeth II of England, British monarch. We express our condolences to the royal family, the United Kingdom and the British people. Peace to her Soul!"

=== Non-state ===
- Two pro–Islamic State (ISIS) Telegram channels based in the West claimed that Queen Elizabeth II would "burn in Hellfire" for not converting to Islam, and shared their criticism of those Muslims who expressed sorrow over her death.

== Foreign royalty ==
=== Commonwealth countries ===
- The Sultan of Brunei, Hassanal Bolkiah, expressed his condolences on behalf of himself, his wife, and the government and people of Brunei. The official statement read: "Throughout her life, she not only gave full attention to the British people but also to the people of the Commonwealth and will always be remembered as a leader with a people's spirit and also for her continuous dedication to public service. In seven decades, her courage and leadership as Head of the Commonwealth became a source of admiration, inspiration and pride that promoted unity among Commonwealth countries." The statement also said that the Sultan and his wife had "fond memories when Her Majesty Queen Elizabeth II and The Duke of Edinburgh visited Brunei Darussalam in 1972 and 1998. They both appreciate the personal contribution of Her Majesty Queen Elizabeth II in strengthening this important relationship."
  - With the death of Elizabeth II, the Sultan of Brunei became the world's longest-reigning incumbent monarch.
- The King of Lesotho, Letsie III, expressed "his shock and deep sadness" in a message of condolences to King Charles III a day after the Queen's death.
- The Yang di-Pertuan Agong of Malaysia, Abdullah of Pahang and Raja Permaisuri Agong, Tunku Azizah Aminah Maimunah Iskandariah expressed their "deepest condolences", according to a statement released by the National Palace of Malaysia. The palace stated that the Queen's "efforts to promote stronger ties between the UK and Malaysia" would be remembered.
  - Sultan of Johor, Sultan Ibrahim Sultan Iskandar and Permaisuri of Johor, Raja Zarith Sofiah gave their condolences in a Facebook post.
  - Sultan Abdullah Sultan Ahmad Shah, the sultan of Pahang and Yang di-Pertuan Agong, ordered state flags in Pahang to be placed at half-mast for three days, beginning 10 September, to pay respects to the death of the Queen, according to state secretary Sallehuddin Ishak in a media statement.
  - Sultan of Selangor, Sharafuddin of Selangor and Tengku Permaisuri Norashikin expressed condolences to the British Royal Family in a statement released by the palace, and stated that "Her Majesty was always very gracious and engaging in her discussions to continually improve bilateral relations with the people of Selangor and Malaysia." He also ordered that the state flag to be flown half-mast for three days starting from 17 September. The crown prince, Tengku Amir Shah signed the book of condolences at the British High Commission in Kuala Lumpur.
- Mangosuthu Buthelezi, in his capacity as traditional prime minister to King of the Zulus Misuzulu Sinqobile kaZwelithini, issued a statement expressing condolences to the House of Windsor, saying, "My personal condolences are with His Majesty the King, with whom I have shared a treasured friendship over many years. I have been honoured to be hosted by His Majesty, and to have hosted him in Ulundi. I have always admired his principled approach to his duties and his people. This was no doubt instilled in him by his beloved Mother, who gave her entire life to the service of her nation. Her reign was both long and laudable. Her genuine care and concern for her people shall never be forgotten."
- The King of Tonga, Tupou VI, conveyed his condolences to the British royal family via the foreign ministry. Princess Frederica Tuita, a niece of the king, said that the Queen "was loved and respected by our family, and we have so many cherished memories."

=== Other ===
- King Hamad bin Isa Al Khalifa of Bahrain expressed condolences, wishing "the deceased mercy and HM King Charles III, the Royal Family and the British people solace and fortitude." He stated that "the world lost a great symbol of humanity, wisdom and tolerance" with the Queen's death. The King also ordered flags in Bahrain to fly at half-mast for three days.
- Philippe, King of the Belgians, relative of the Queen, and Queen Mathilde of Belgium expressed in a statement, "It was with great sadness that we learned of the death of Her Majesty Queen Elizabeth II. She was an extraordinary personality. We will always keep fond memories of this great Lady who, throughout her reign, showed dignity, courage and devotion. Each of our encounters will remain etched in our memories forever. The United Kingdom has lost an exceptional monarch who left a deep mark on history. We extend our deepest condolences to the Royal Family and the British people. Rest in peace, Your Majesty, with your beloved husband."
- Queen Margrethe II of Denmark, the Queen's third cousin, wrote in a letter addressed to King Charles III that she was "deeply moved by the sad news of your beloved mother's death. You mother was very important to me and my family. She was a towering figure among the European monarchs and a great inspiration to us all. We shall miss her terribly." At the time of the Queen's death, Margrethe was celebrating her Golden Jubilee, and subsequently scaled back some celebrations and ordered a moment of silence be added in honour of the Queen.
  - With the death of Elizabeth II, the Queen of Denmark became the longest-reigning European sovereign and the world's only remaining queen regnant, until her abdication on 14 January 2024.
- Prince Jean, Count of Paris and Philomena, Countess of Paris expressed their condolences to the Royal Family.
- Georg Friedrich Prinz von Preussen, head of the Prussian line of the House of Hohenzollern (non-reigning house), expressed his condolences in a statement and remarked that the Queen with her "unique personality, warmth and distinctive sense of duty that placed public welfare above individual interests" has been a role model to him. He announced that the British flag would fly at half-mast at Hohenzollern Castle on the day of her state funeral.
- Franz von Bayern, head of the House of Wittelsbach (non-reigning house) and historic heir of Ludwig III of Bavaria, said that the Queen was able to "win the hearts and respect of all people" and remembered personally witnessing her friendliness and charisma during the conversations he had with her.
- Former King Constantine II of Greece, a relative of Queen Elizabeth, described her as "a beacon of dignity and humility for the whole world." He added, "We have been through so much together and I will never forget the love and support she showed me and my family." His son, Pavlos, Prince of Denmark and former Crown Prince of Greece, called Queen Elizabeth a "remarkable person, a sovereign who led by example, who will for ever be admired for her ethical leadership and commitment to her national and the commonwealth." He also encouraged people to "be thankful for her life", before praising Charles.
- Reza Pahlavi, former Crown Prince of Iran and head of the Pahlavi dynasty (non-reigning house) offered his and his family's condolences to the British people and royal family in a statement posted on Twitter, saying Queen Elizabeth II will be remembered as a "symbol of wisdom, strength, and grace".
- Duke Vittorio Emanuele, Prince of Naples expressed his condolences on behalf of the Royal House, and said that "Elizabeth II was a wonderful example for all her dedication to duty, courageous altruism, and extraordinary self-sacrifice for her people and her family.".
- Emperor Naruhito of Japan expressed his "deep sorrow" and heartfelt condolences over the death of Elizabeth II and his "earnest respect and gratitude for the Queen's legacy, her achievements and her dedication."
- King Abdullah II of Jordan expressed his condolences, stating that the Queen was "a beacon of wisdom and principled leadership for seven decades", and "a partner for Jordan and a dear family friend". Queen Rania of Jordan described her as "an icon of selfless dedication and unwavering commitment, a queen who embodied the traits of a faithful and devoted sovereign". Seven days of mourning were declared.
- The Emir of Kuwait, Nawaf Al-Ahmad Al-Jaber Al-Sabah expressed his country's "deep sorrow and sympathy for Queen Elizabeth's death" in a cable to King Charles III, according to an official statement by the Kuwait News Agency, which added Nawaf "recalled with pride Her Majesty's path of giving over the past decades that boosted the high status of the UK on the international stage as well as her effective contribution to world issues."
- The Liechtenstein Princely House offered their condolences to the British royal family. On 15 September, Hereditary Prince Alois and Hereditary Princess Sophie visited the town hall in Vaduz to sign a book of condolences.
- Grand Duke Henri of Luxembourg and Grand Duchess Maria Teresa of Luxembourg released a statement on the Grand Ducal Court website, expressing their condolences and remarked the Queen's unique example of service to the country and people.
- Albert II, Prince of Monaco expressed condolences in a statement addressed to King Charles III and remarked the Queen's "unwavering commitment and dedication to duty during Her reign has always been extremely inspiring." His wife, Princess Charlene, offering her condolences on Instagram and remarked that the Queen was "a truly great lady whose dedication and service was recognised throughout the world during the 70 years of her reign."
- King Mohammed VI of Morocco, in a message of condolences to King Charles III, stated that the Queen "invariably stood as a symbol of the greatness of the United Kingdom, devoting her entire life to serving her country," adding that under her reign the United Kingdom "achieved much progress and prosperity", and that Morocco had lost a "great and special friend" who was "particularly keen to strengthen the longstanding friendship between our two time-honoured monarchies." Mohammed VI later congratulated Charles III following the proclamation of his accession to the throne.
- King Willem-Alexander of the Netherlands, Queen Máxima of the Netherlands and Princess Beatrix expressed in a statement on the website of the Dutch royal house: "We remember Queen Elizabeth II with deep respect and great affection. Steadfast and wise, she dedicated her long life to serving the British people. We feel a strong bond with the United Kingdom and its royal family, and we share their sorrow at this time. We are very grateful for our countries' close friendship, to which Queen Elizabeth made such an unforgettable contribution."
- King Harald V of Norway, the Queen's second cousin, expressed in a statement on the website of the Norwegian royal family: "Our thoughts go to His Majesty the King and the closest family after the passing of Queen Elizabeth. Throughout a century the Queen dedicated herself devotedly to her deed, and followed the British people through joys and sorrows, in ups and downs. Our condolences go also to the British people."
- The Sultan of Oman, Haitham bin Tariq, offered condolences to King Charles III in a telegram and stating that the Queen was "a permanent friend of the Sultanate of Oman and contributed to strengthening the close bilateral relations between the two countries." Sultan Haitham ordered the flags to fly at half-mast in public and private sector buildings and at the embassies of the Sultanate of Oman on 9 September in honour of Queen Elizabeth II.
- Margareta, Custodian of the Crown of Romania, Prince Radu of Romania, and the royal family expressed their condolences to King Charles III.
- Grand Duchess Maria Vladimirovna of Russia and her family expressed their condolences, she emphasized that the Queen "has always treated Russia, not taking into account any political aspects, but from the point of view of culture, from the point of view of history, respectfully"
- King Salman of Saudi Arabia, sent his condolences to King Charles III, stating that "Her majesty was a role model for leadership that will be immortalized in history." Crown Prince of Saudi Arabia Mohammed bin Salman stated in his condolences that the world "will remember the great impact and the great deeds she did throughout her career".
- Alexander, Crown Prince of Yugoslavia, expressed condolences on behalf of the royal family of Serbia. He reflected Elizabeth with "her great spirit, wisdom, and courage."
- King Felipe VI of Spain issued his first public reaction two hours after the Queen's death. He stated "Queen Elizabeth will be remembered as one [of] the best queens of all time for her dignity, sense of duty, courage, and devotion to her people always and at all times."
- King Carl XVI Gustaf of Sweden released a statement expressing his condolences at the loss of his dear relative. He said, "The Queen served her countries and the Commonwealth with outstanding dedication and duty. She has been a constant presence, not only in British society but also internationally. She has always been dear to my family and a precious link in our shared family history. We offer our heartfelt condolences to Her Majesty's family and her peoples."
- King Vajiralongkorn and Queen Mother Sirikit of Thailand sent separate messages of condolences to Charles III, evoking the two state visits made by the Queen in 1972 and 1996.
- The emir of Abu Dhabi Sheikh Mohamed bin Zayed Al Nahyan, also president of the United Arab Emirates (UAE), extended his condolences to the British royal family and people. Calling Queen Elizabeth a "close friend of the UAE", he also stated that she was a "beloved and respected leader whose long reign was characterised by dignity, compassion and a tireless commitment to serving her country." In response to her death, the UAE declared a three-day mourning period, with flags flown in half-mast in the public and private sectors, and in the country's embassies abroad.
  - The emir of Dubai Sheikh Mohammed bin Rashid Al Maktoum, also vice president and prime minister of the UAE, also offered his condolences on Twitter, stating that she was "a global icon who represented the finest qualities of her nation and people" and "her incredible lifetime of service and duty to the United Kingdom is unparalleled in our modern world."

== Religious leaders ==
=== Christian ===
- Archbishop of Canterbury Justin Welby, seniormost bishop of the Church of England, of which the Queen was the Supreme Governor, paid tribute to her and recalled "her trust in God and profound love for God". Welby further stated that Anglican churches across the country would offer "a physical space [...] in which people can express their sorrow and find hope and abundant life" throughout the period of national mourning. In addition, Vincent Nichols, the Catholic Archbishop of Westminster, paid tribute to the Queen, saying that her faith "so often and so eloquently proclaimed in her public messages, has been an inspiration to me, and I am sure to many."
- Pope Francis, Pope and sovereign of the Vatican City, said in a telegram that "I willingly join all who mourn her loss in praying for the late Queen's eternal rest, and in paying tribute to her life of unstinting service to the good of the Nation and the Commonwealth, her example of devotion to duty, her steadfast witness of faith in Jesus Christ and her firm hope in his promises".
- Bartholomew, the Ecumenical Patriarch of Constantinople, signed a condolences book at the British consulate in Istanbul.
- Hierarchs of the Coptic Orthodox Church stationed in Egypt, including Pope Tawadros II of Alexandria and Anba Angaelos also offered condolences: "The Coptic Orthodox Church [...] mourns Queen Elizabeth of Britain who left our mortal world after sitting on the throne of Great Britain as a queen for more than 70 years [...] [o]ver the course of her reign, Her Majesty used her position for good, serving the nation through tireless visits to various charities and organisations that serve the wider community and the most vulnerable."
- Catholicos of All Armenians of the Armenian Apostolic Church Karekin II sent a letter of condolence to King Charles III of the UK on the death of Queen Elizabeth II. Karekin II added that for seven decades, the Queen inspired unity among her people and became a "symbol of strength and determination in the most difficult times".
- Patriarch of the Georgian Orthodox Church Ilia II of Georgia sent his condolences to the royal family, describing the Queen as "the most outstanding monarch of our time".
- In a statement posted on the website of the Russian Orthodox Church, Patriarch of Moscow and all Rus' Kirill stated that: "Her Majesty remained a symbol of the stability, continuity, and coherence of the centuries-old historical traditions not only for her homeland but also for the whole European continent", also remarking that the Queen was "an example of deep spirituality and supreme culture."

=== Other ===
- The Grand Imam of al-Azhar, Ahmed el-Tayeb, extended his condolences to King Charles, the British royal family and the people of the United Kingdom adding that "that influencing personality who spent her life serving her nation and excelled to elevate her people."
- The 14th Dalai Lama sent his condolences to King Charles III, in which he said that the Queen lived "a meaningful life with dignity, grace, a strong sense of service and a warm heart".

== Cancellations, postponements and closures in the UK ==
=== Postponements ===
The ceremony that was due to be held to mark the transitioning of Colchester from town to city status was cancelled.

The last two concerts of the BBC Proms, including the "Last Night", were cancelled as a mark of respect. The National Television Awards were postponed and rescheduled to 13 October as the original date of the ceremony, 15 September, fell during the period of national mourning. The Mercury Prize was among the events that were called off, while the Royal Opera House announced that they would not go on with the opening night of one of their new productions and would not be operating on the day of the state funeral. The Liberal Democrat Autumn conference was scrapped. Tynwald postponed its meeting on cost of living crisis until 22 September. The Trades Union Congress also cancelled their annual conference as a sign of respect.

Following the announcement of the Queen's death, the RMT and Associated Society of Locomotive Engineers and Firemen unions suspended planned train strikes scheduled for 15 and 17 September. A Royal Mail strike by the CWU planned for the following day was also suspended. The Royal College of Nursing delayed their strike ballot.

The Bank of England postponed their interest rate decision by one week.

The Department for Culture, Media and Sport (DCMS) first issued guidance to sporting bodies after the death was announced. Most sporting bodies cancelled events until at least 11 September, but some events between 8 and 11 September went ahead as scheduled with mourning protocol, such as pregame observation of a moment of silence, playing of "God Save the King", and all players wearing black armbands.

All matches sanctioned by the British Boxing Board of Control were ordered postponed until 11 September. The England and Wales Cricket Board suspended all fixtures scheduled for 9 September, including the second day of the third test between England and South Africa (the first day had already been called off due to weather) and 2022 Rachael Heyhoe Flint Trophy (the matches were later declared "no result"). The Third Test resumed on 10 September with day three, as the match cannot be extended due to South Africa needing travel and rest time before their tour of India. The remainder of the 2022 Tour of Britain was cancelled, and the event was declared complete after its fifth of eight stages. The Premier League, English Football League, NIFL Premiership, and Scottish Professional Football League (SPFL) postponed matches scheduled for 9 September. On 9 September, all English, Northern Irish, Welsh, and professional Scottish football was suspended until 11 September. This decision was heavily criticised by supporters' groups, journalists and former players.

The British Horseracing Authority ordered the suspension of all racing until 10 September. The St Leger Stakes, the Champagne Stakes and the Park Stakes, the Doncaster Cup and the Flying Childers Stakes were all postponed. The St Leger Stakes started with a two-minute silence. Horse racing events on the day of the funeral were also cancelled. Play in the 2022 BMW PGA Championship was suspended until 10 September. No play took place on 9 September, and all facilities were closed. Premiership Rugby postponed all matches until 9 September. Individual teams may request the postponement of fixtures if the team has "connections" to the royal family, or the availability of players is impacted by their commitments to serve official public safety duties tied to the mourning period. The Scottish Rugby Union postponed all matches until the weekend of 11 September. The Great North Run half-marathon cancelled its Great North 5k sister event, its Junior and Mini Great North Run events, but went on with the remainder of its programme. Organisers stated that the event would provide "an opportunity for people to come together and express condolences", and that the event's charitable contributions would be "a fitting tribute to the Queen who lived her life in service to the country and its people."

=== Businesses and organisations ===
Organisations including Kew Gardens, the National Gallery, Hampton Court Palace, the Tower of London and Legoland Windsor Resort closed on Friday 9 September to show respect. Department store Selfridges also closed.

Many businesses decided to close on Monday 19 September, the day of the funeral.

Retailers including John Lewis, Harrods, Primark, B&Q, Homebase, Poundland, Screwfix, Wickes and Toolstation announced that they would not open as a mark of respect and to allow employees to watch the funeral.

Supermarket chains Aldi Süd, Morrisons and Lidl also announced their intention to close, while Waitrose announced the majority of stores would close except those on the funeral route which are scheduled to close for the duration of the funeral. Larger Tesco and Sainsbury's stores were to be closed for the duration of the day with smaller stores open after 5 p.m. Many supermarkets also stated that their forecourts would be closed until 5 p.m. on the day of the funeral.

Costa and Greggs announced full day closures for their stores, while McDonald's said they planned to be closed until 5 p.m.

Odeon, Picturehouse and Cineworld, announced the closures of all their cinemas. Vue announced the closure of most of its cinemas, with those remaining open instead showing the funeral free of charge.

Museums, including the Science Museum and Natural History Museum, and zoos including Chester Zoo, Colchester Zoo and Banham Zoo also announced that they were to close.

The Driver and Vehicle Standards Agency suspended theory and practical examinations on 19 September. Many councils across the UK postponed bin collections while others closed recycling centres and libraries.

Heathrow Airport announced that no landings and takeoffs would take place for a thirty-minute period starting at 11:40 a.m. on the day of the funeral, to avoid disturbances for aircraft during the planned two-minute silence for the Queen, with the rest of the day having numerous arrival and departure changes.

Center Parcs announced that it was planning to close its sites and remove visitors residing there for the day of the funeral, but subsequent backlash led to its changing its position to allowing guests already there to stay but closing all facilities and delaying new arrivals.

Transport for London announced a ban on buskers during the national period of mourning after initially announcing a three-day ban.

Apple and Microsoft paid tribute on their homepage updated with a black-and-white image of Queen Elizabeth II. In addition, Google changed the logo on its website to a grey version.

== Organisations ==
=== International ===
- NATO Secretary General Jens Stoltenberg tweeted his condolences. Including a post with an accompanying photograph of the flags in front of the NATO headquarters in Brussels, that "the flags of all 30 [NATO] Allies are at half-mast in honour of Her Majesty Queen Elizabeth II, a strong supporter of our transatlantic Alliance, our armed forces & our values. I will always remember her wisdom and warmth."
- Secretary-General of the United Nations António Guterres issued a statement that highlighted and paid tribute to the length of Queen Elizabeth II's reign and her grace, dignity and dedication to her duty and her status as a good friend of the United Nations. The General Assembly observed a minute's silence in her honour on 8 September.
- President of the European Council Charles Michel said: "Once called Elizabeth the Steadfast, she never failed to show us the importance of lasting values in a modern world with her service and commitment." President of the European Commission Ursula von der Leyen described the Queen as "one of the most respected personalities worldwide".
- Commonwealth of Nations Secretary-General Patricia Scotland said: "Her Majesty loved the Commonwealth, and the Commonwealth loved her. During her reign she travelled more than any monarch in history, visiting every part of our family of nations. The growth and vibrancy of our modern Commonwealth is a credit to her and testament to her dedication, wisdom and leadership."
- International Olympic Committee (IOC) president Thomas Bach lamented the loss of "a great supporter of sport and of the Olympic Movement… …Our thoughts are with the Royal Family and in particular our IOC colleague, Her Royal Highness The Princess Royal, and all the members of the Olympic community in the United Kingdom and across the Commonwealth." The Olympic and British flags were flown at half-mast and the executive board held a minute's silence in honour of the Queen.
- International Paralympic Committee (IPC) president Andrew Parsons said the IPC "sends its deepest condolences to the Royal Family of the United Kingdom following the very sad passing of Her Majesty Queen Elizabeth II."
- FIFA president Gianni Infantino described the Queen's death as "a huge loss to football, to our society, and to the world", and recalled her presenting of the Jules Rimet Trophy to England captain Bobby Moore following their team's victory in the 1966 FIFA World Cup final.
- International Federation for Equestrian Sports (FEI) stated the Queen "was an incredible role model and shining light within the equestrian community who was awarded the FEI Lifetime Achievement Award for her dedication to equestrian sports", and that her "devotion to horses will forever be admired and cherished within our community."

=== United Kingdom ===
The University of Derby's Vice-Chancellor, Professor Kathryn Mitchell, described the Queen's 70-year reign as "a remarkable achievement", and added that "her commitment and leadership are an inspiration to us all."

Vice-Chancellors and spokespeople from Staffordshire University, Keele University, the University of Essex, and Lancaster University paid their tributes by reflecting on the past visits by the Queen and the Duke of Edinburgh.

=== Australia ===
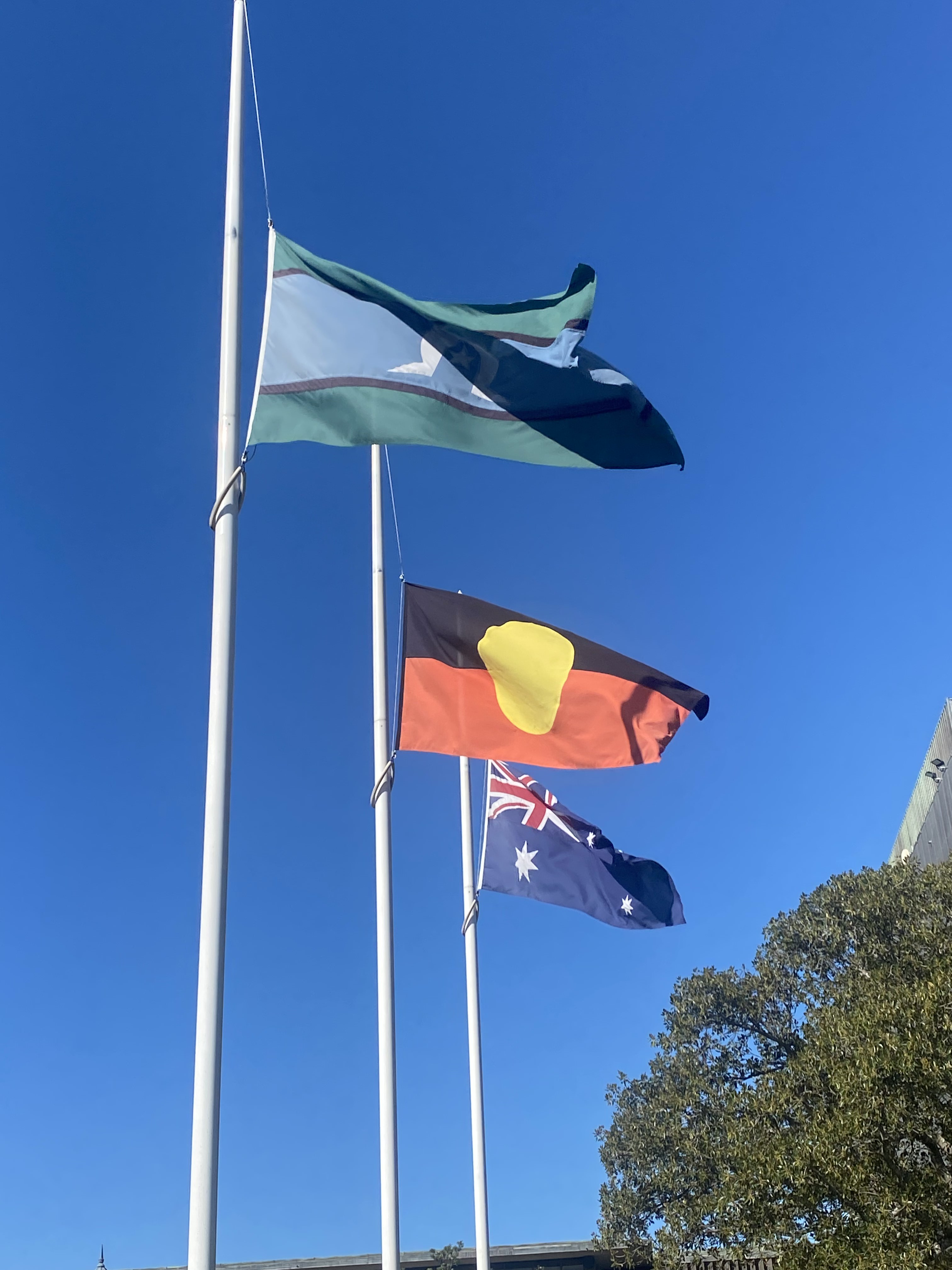
Flags at half-staff in the University of Sydney following the death of Queen Elizabeth II

Queen Elizabeth II was the patron of 27 organisations in Australia. Some of these organisations released statements to pay tribute to her service to their organisation:

The Anglican Mothers Union Australia said that "we will always remember her intelligence and humility in making wise decisions, her charm and sense of humour, and her sincere caring and gentleness. Hers was a life born to serve God and all humanity and her legacy will live on in so many ways." The Australian Medical Association said that "the AMA pays tribute to the long reign of Queen Elizabeth II and acknowledges the many intersections that the medical profession in Australia has with organisations enjoying royal patronage. The AMA acknowledges the Queen's selfless service and expresses our condolences to her family." The Australian Physiotherapy Association said "we pay our respects to the decades of service she gave to the Commonwealth. We admire the grace and dignity with which she led her life of duty."

The Australian Red Cross said that the "Australian Red Cross pays tribute to Her Majesty, Queen Elizabeth II, on the occasion of her death. Her Majesty was a supporter of the work of the Red Cross Red Crescent Movement across the world, including in Australia." Melbourne's Royal Children's Hospital said "we will always be proud of our long association with the Queen and send our sympathies to HRH King Charles and the Royal Family, and thank them for the special relationship the RCH was privileged to enjoy during Her Majesty's reign." Melbourne's Royal Women's Hospital said "the Women's is a strong supporter of gender equity, so we are grateful for the Queen's example of female leadership which was admired by many people." The Royal Melbourne Hospital said that "the Royal Melbourne Hospital extends our deepest condolences to The Royal Family on the loss of Her Majesty Queen Elizabeth II. The Queen was a much-loved patron of the RMH since taking her reign in 1952."

Racing Victoria said "Racing Victoria extends its heartfelt condolences following the sad news of the passing of Queen Elizabeth II. An avid racegoer, breeder and owner, Queen Elizabeth's love of the horse and thoroughbred racing was an unmistakable characteristic of her reign." RSL Australia said "she dedicated her life to the service of her nation and the peoples of the Commonwealth and never shirked this great responsibility. The RSL will be forever grateful for her commitment, encouragement and support for our veterans and service personnel." Scouts Australia said "her outstanding example of service, encouragement and kindness was an inspiration to us all."

The Australian War Memorial paid tribute with her name being projected onto the Hall of Memory. Australian War Memorial Director Matt Anderson says the Australian War Memorial is all about those who "put service before self".

== Public figures ==
=== United Kingdom ===
- The Poet Laureate, Simon Armitage published a commemorative poem "Floral Tribute" on 13 September 2022; it takes the form of a double acrostic in which the initial letters of the lines of each of its two verses spell out "Elizabeth".
- Singer Rick Astley posted a photo of the Queen on his Twitter with the accompanying text "Rest in peace Queen Elizabeth".
- Biologist and natural historian Sir David Attenborough paid tribute to the Queen, recalling her "precious" and "genuine" laugh, adding that she was an "expert at getting people to relax".
- Retired England men's football captain David Beckham wrote a post on Instagram: "I'm truly saddened by the death of Her Majesty, The Queen. How devastated we all feel today shows what she has meant to people in this country and around the world. How much she inspired us with her leadership. How she comforted us when times were tough. Until her last days she served her country with dignity and grace. This year she would have known how loved she was. My thoughts and prayers are with our Royal Family." Beckham was also seen in the public queue to view the Queen lying-in-state on 16 September at Westminster Hall in London and ultimately queued for 13 hours before reaching the coffin.
- Actor Daniel Craig, best known for playing James Bond for 15 years, wrote "I, like so many, was deeply saddened by the news today and my thoughts are with The Royal Family, those she loved and all those who loved her. She leaves an incomparable legacy and will be profoundly missed."
- Stephen Fry admitted that he was "sobbing" following news of the death of the Queen. He wrote: "Oh dear. Oh my. Oh heavens. Bless my soul. Oh lor. [sic] Heck,"
- Sir Elton John paid tribute to the Queen saying that she was "a huge part of my life from childhood to this day, and I will miss her dearly", also saying that the Queen had been an "inspiring presence to be around". John was performing at Rogers Centre in Toronto on the day of the Queen's death, where he said "She led the country through some of our greatest and darkest moments with grace and decency and genuine warmth", before performing "Don't Let the Sun Go Down on Me".
- Sir Tom Jones paid his respects, writing, "Queen Elizabeth II was a constant presence and inspiration throughout my life. She was a reassuring force in difficult times, her dedication was faultless and her commitment to duty unrivalled. I am honoured and blessed to have witnessed her reign. My deepest sympathies to the Royal Family and gratefully I said, long live the King."
- England men's football captain Harry Kane of Tottenham Hotspur F.C. said: "My thoughts are with the Royal Family at this very difficult time. The Queen was an amazing inspiration and will be remembered for her incredible years of service to this country. Rest in peace, Your Majesty."
- Sir Paul McCartney posted on his Instagram "God bless Queen Elizabeth II / May she rest in peace / Long live The King."
- Sir Mick Jagger posted on his Instagram "For my whole life Her Majesty, Queen Elizabeth II has always been there. In my childhood I can recall watching her wedding highlights on TV. I remember her as a beautiful young lady, to the much beloved grandmother of the nation. My deepest sympathies are with the Royal family."
- Singer Ed Sheeran posted a photo of the queen with a heart emoji on his Instagram story.
- England men's football manager and retired player Gareth Southgate paid tribute to the Queen, saying "In remembering and celebrating the life of Her Majesty The Queen, we are also acknowledging her remarkable leadership and lifetime of dignified service.She showed the world what it is to be British. Her values, her dignity, her resilience were an exemplar to us all and she has provided us with stability and reassurance in the best and also most difficult of times."
- Sir Patrick Stewart paid tribute to the Queen during an interview with Entertainment Tonight.
- Sir Rod Stewart wrote: "The Queen has been a presence all through my life as a great unifier. A shining star that will never fade in our hearts and souls. What a privilege it was to perform for her. My deepest sympathies to the Royal Family. God save the King."
- Singer Harry Styles paid tribute to the Queen during his Love On Tour performance in Madison Square Garden, New York City, in which he asked the audience to applaud the queen "for 70 years of her service".
- Queen's Brian May and Roger Taylor sent their deepest condolences to the Queen's family.

=== United States ===
- Apple CEO Tim Cook tweeted "There is nothing more noble than to devote your life to the service of others. We stand with the people of the UK and Commonwealth in honoring the life and dedication to duty of her Majesty Queen Elizabeth II. May she rest in peace."
- Former baseball right fielder Reggie Jackson tweeted "Now we all know I was innocent ! Amen! RIP Queen E !", in reference to a role he played in the film The Naked Gun: From the Files of Police Squad! where a fictional version of himself was tasked with assassinating the Queen at a baseball game in Angel Stadium.
- Media personality and businesswoman Kris Jenner paid tribute to the Queen via Instagram, stating, "Rest In Peace, Her Majesty Queen Elizabeth II. Graceful, dedicated, elegant, unforgettable. Today and always we will remember her as one of the greatest leaders our world has ever seen. I send my love and condolences to the Royal Family."
- Rapper Kanye West posted a tribute to the Queen on Instagram, saying "Life is precious. Releasing all grudges today. Leaning into the light", before deleting all his past Instagram posts.

=== Other ===
- Australian rugby league player Caitlin Moran celebrated the Queen's death on Instagram, stating: "Today's a good fkn [sic] day – Luke [Combs] announced his tour and this dumb dog [the Queen] dies. Happy fkn [sic] Friday." The NRL Women's Premiership penalised Moran for her post, suspending her for one game and issuing a suspended fine equivalent to 25% of Moran's contract. The Instagram post was later deleted.
- Norwegian band a-ha, who met Queen Elizabeth II, posted condolences on their official website and their official Facebook page, writing: "Like countless people around the world, we were very sad to hear the news of the passing of HM Queen Elizabeth II yesterday. A huge oak has fallen in the Great British forest. Our thoughts go to her family, our friends in the UK, and the people of Britain in this time of mourning".
- Irish pop duo Jedward posted a video on Twitter saying "Hi everyone, The Queen has died. It is official." Two days after the Queen's death, Jedward posted two tweets calling for the abolition of the monarchy and Irish reunification. These tweets attracted a significant amount of controversy which resulted in the phrase "Abolish Jedward" trending on Twitter in the United Kingdom for a few hours.
- Russian journalist Margarita Simonyan, editor-in-chief of the state-run network RT, asked colleagues to block coverage of the Queen while adding on social media, "So she died. Well, RIP. We all die. This is not our pain."

== Media ==
=== Radio ===
BBC Radio 4 broadcast a rolling news programme throughout the afternoon when news of the Queen's health was announced, presented by Mishal Husain and Evan Davis. Programmes on other BBC Radio networks continued as normal up until the announcement of the death. Stations were cut-off at 6:36 pm (except on Radio 5 Live, which handed over from its own special coverage), and Radio 4 newsreader Chris Aldridge read the official statement twice, with the national anthem played in-between, before all stations then took the Radio 4 coverage for the remainder of the evening.

Global-owned network LBC dedicated its output to the developing news story upon the initial announcement of the Queen being put under medical observation. Presenter Andrew Marr broke down upon announcing the news of the Queen's death. A newsflash was then broadcast shortly afterwards on other Global stations (Capital, Classic FM, Heart, Radio X and Smooth). This was then followed by the playing of sombre music on all stations – including Elgar's Nimrod – for a short period, after which all Global stations simulcasted LBC's coverage until 11 pm.

Bauer stations – Absolute Radio, Greatest Hits Radio, Hits Radio and Magic – suspended programmes after the announcement of the Queen's death and broadcast a stripped back playlist of music, interspersed with presenters paying tribute to the Queen.

The BBC Radio 4 series The Archers included a conversation about the Queen's death, between Lynda Snell and Lilian Bellamy, as the first section of the episode broadcast on 11 September.

=== Social media ===
The first official public announcement of the Queen's death was made on the Royal Family's official Twitter account at 18:30, one minute before the announcement was carried on the PA Media newswire and two minutes before the death was announced on BBC News. Noting the shift in communications technologies since the death of George VI, media outlets pointed out that in the years leading up to the Queen's death, the Royal Family's use of social media had expanded dramatically.

Responses from social media users were mixed, with many sending their condolences to the royal family or thanking the Queen for her work. Others posted jokes, memes, videos, and statements that were celebrating or mocking the Queen's death. These responses attracted criticism, as many users considered them inappropriate and distasteful. Forbes wrote that while news of her death "ruled" Twitter, "so did the trolls", in reference to the "jokes, criticism or outright hostility toward the late monarch."

Less sympathetic reactions to the Queen's death were mainly tied to debates surrounding the legacy of the British Empire and came from many of those now questioning their country's relationship to the monarchy. Many citizens in Commonwealth countries were questioning their membership, as those who viewed the Queen favorably are said to be less inclined to look on a King favorably. In Kenya, the words "Mau Mau" and "Dedan Kimathi" trended online as many reflected on widespread atrocities committed by British soldiers during the first eight years of the Queen's reign, as well as the subsequent effort to conceal records of it. Criticism also persisted in non-Commonwealth nations with historical links to the British Empire. Notably, many Irish people resent the monarchy's treatment of Ireland including Northern Ireland's status as part of the UK. A video of a chant of "Lizzy's in a box" being sung by Irish football fans in Dublin went viral.

Some parts of Black Twitter celebrated her death due to Britain's history of colonialism in Africa such as their involvement in the Atlantic slave trade and the Scramble for Africa. Although these events took place long before Elizabeth II took the throne, some social media comments described her as a symbol of the British empire.

Carnegie Mellon University linguistics professor Uju Anya tweeted, "I heard the chief monarch of a thieving and raping genocidal empire is finally dying. May her pain be excruciating." Anya further stated that her family was persecuted during the Nigerian Civil War, which she described as a "genocide ... directly supported and facilitated by the British government then headed by the monarch Queen Elizabeth II." The Tweet provoked significant controversy, with the university disavowing her statement and other prominent people, including Amazon founder and major CMU donor Jeff Bezos, sharply criticising Anya. Within hours, the post was deleted by Twitter, which stated that it had violated the company's rules.

Kenyan-American poet and academic Mũkoma wa Ngũgĩ, who also cited persecution of his family in the Mau Mau rebellion, wrote on Twitter, "If the queen had apologized for slavery, colonialism and neocolonialism and urged the crown to offer reparations for the millions of lives taken in her/their names, then perhaps I would do the human thing and feel bad. As a Kenyan, I feel nothing. This theater is absurd." Mũkoma later said that with her death, there needs to be a "dismantling" of the Commonwealth and a "real reckoning with colonial abuses".

Numerous corporate brands were mocked for social media tributes to the Queen that were seen by users as strange or unnecessary. The Twitter accounts for the West End musicals Hamilton and Les Misérables—both of which depict republican revolutions—posted statements of condolence, with the latter account later deleting its post following negative feedback.

=== Television ===
All BBC Television channels (barring BBC Three and Four, which were not broadcasting at the time, and subsequently had programmes suspended; and children's channels CBBC, which announced the news through their programme CBBC Newsround, and CBeebies, which saw no interruptions to its regular schedule) and radio stations suspended their schedules following the announcement of her death. On BBC Television, rolling news coverage had begun just after 12:30 pm on the BBC News Channel following the initial announcement that the Queen had been put on medical observation, with BBC One interrupting Bargain Hunt shortly afterwards to simulcast the news coverage. The BBC's lead news anchor Huw Edwards began presenting from 2 pm onwards, accompanied by royal correspondent Nicholas Witchell. Edwards then made the official announcement of the Queen's death at 6:31 pm; shortly afterwards the screen faded to black to allow for BBC Two (which aired 2022 Diamond League finals) to join the BBC News feed. Extensive schedule changes took place across BBC Television, ITV, Channel 4, Channel 5 and Sky to show news coverage and obituary documentaries. Commercial television channels including UKTV and BT Sport suspended advertising breaks for a number of hours following the announcement and many commercial radio music stations switched to a sombre playlist in the days following the Queen's death. Advertisements were suspended on both ITV and Sky until at least Saturday (10 September).

Channel 4 cut short an episode of Hollyoaks to announce the death of the Queen, airing news coverage until 10 pm and then documentaries on the Queen thereafter, before airing an amended schedule of programmes the following day. The comedy programme The Last Leg was cancelled that evening out of respect while Gogglebox aired as normal. The release of the comedy-horror series Don't Hug Me I'm Scared on Channel 4 was delayed from 12 to 30 September. Advertising was suspended out of respect, a move Channel 5 also repeated.

Sky was criticised after an episode of Last Week Tonight with John Oliver was edited to remove jokes related to the Queen's death.

The Netflix series The Crown, which covers Elizabeth's reign, suspended filming of its sixth season for a period of time "out of respect".

The BBC postponed the broadcast of the launch episode of the twentieth series of Strictly Come Dancing out of respect. The programme—which was recorded on the evening before the Queen's death—had been originally scheduled to air on 17 September, which was two days before the funeral. It was subsequently rescheduled to air the following Friday (23 September). The BBC soap opera EastEnders paid tribute to the Queen with a special scene that aired at the start of the episode broadcast on 12 September. The BBC aired Paddington films in honour of the Queen.

In Australia, the ABC News Channel suspended all regular programming and news bulletins for continuous coverage of the Queen's death, while Seven Network also switched to delivering 24-hour coverage, delaying regular television programmes that were scheduled to air.

In Canada and New Zealand, the Canadian Broadcasting Corporation and TVNZ also broadcast special tribute programmes. CTV, Global and Three also switched to 24-hour coverage. CTV's NFL, ACC and Pac-12 football coverage was sent to TSN and CTV2 (Exception was for the Buffalo Bills, contracted to SportsNet Ontario.) As a result, the Canadian TV season did not begin until September 26, 2022.

In the United States, CNN, MSNBC, Fox News, ABC, NBC and CBS all broke the news of her death, with the three main television networks (ABC, CBS and NBC) breaking into normal programming (GMA3: What You Need to Know on ABC, the opening credits of The Bold and the Beautiful on CBS, and the penultimate daytime episode of Days of Our Lives on NBC) to announce it.

=== Theatre ===
Performances on the West End of London went on as scheduled during the mourning period with dimmed lights, as per guidance from the UK government. Several shows contained a moment of silence in the Queen's memory, and the musical Wicked aired a disclaimer before the performance the evening of the Queen's death, stating it was being performed as written. This was likely due to the potential for the opening number "No One Mourns the Wicked" and in particular its initial lyric "Good news, she's dead!" to be seen as in poor taste in light of the circumstances.

=== Advertising ===
All major out-of-home advertising companies, including Clear Channel UK and JCDecaux, agreed to suspend commercial advertising on digital out-of-home billboards and poster signs in favour of memorial displays. Media outlets and major social networks such as Twitter similarly suspended all display advertising. This also occurred on the day of the funeral.

On 12 September 2022, the UK division of Nintendo announced that it would not be airing the Nintendo Direct scheduled for the following day "as a mark of respect during this period of national mourning"; instead, it was made available for audiences in the region as a YouTube upload. Following the Direct, audiences on social media speculated that the decision was made due to the perceived inappropriateness of the title for The Legend of Zelda: Tears of the Kingdom, which was revealed at the end of the presentation.

== Sport ==
=== Football ===
All football fixtures across the Home Nations were postponed or suspended from 8 September until at least 11 September.

In England, tributes were issued by current men's and women's national team players and staff. Included was England women's team manager Sarina Wiegman, who issued a statement reading how "This summer she took the time to write to me and my players congratulating us for our success," referring to Elizabeth II's message of congratulations after England won UEFA Women's Euro 2022 as hosts at the end of July – ultimately the final senior UEFA or FIFA tournament of Elizabeth II's reign, the Lionesses' first major trophy and England's first major senior trophy, men's or women's, since the men's team won the 1966 FIFA World Cup as hosts and the Queen had presented the Jules Rimet Trophy to Bobby Moore. Wiegman continued, "In that letter she called us an 'inspiration for girls and women'. It is you, your Majesty, who was the inspiration with your unrelenting work ethic, leadership, dignity and kindness."

When the English Premier League resumed the following week after the weekend's fixtures were called off following Elizabeth II's death, each fixture included all teams and match officials wearing black armbands. During the weekend games, bouquets were laid in the centre circle by representatives of each team and a minute's silence followed by "God Save the King" preceded kickoff. Specifically:

- Aston Villa F.C.−Southampton (Villa Park) – All lights in the ground turned out during the minute's silence before kickoff except for one spotlight on the centre circle and Elizabeth II being featured on the match programme.
- Wolverhampton Wanderers F.C.−Manchester City (Molineux Stadium) – Centre circle bouquets delivered by former players Steve Bull (Wolves) and Mike Summerbee (Manchester City).
- Newcastle United F.C.−Bournemouth (St James' Park) – Centre circle bouquets delivered by Newcastle co-owner Amanda Staveley and Bournemouth chairman Jeff Mostyn.
- Tottenham Hotspur F.C.−Leicester City F.C. (Tottenham Hotspur Stadium) – Centre circle bouquets delivered by former players Ledley King (Tottenham) and Emile Heskey (Leicester).
- Brentford−Arsenal (Brentford Community Stadium) – Centre circle bouquets delivered by managers Thomas Frank (Brentford) and Mikel Arteta (Arsenal).
- Everton−West Ham United F.C. (Goodison Park) – Centre circle bouquets delivered by managers Frank Lampard (Everton) and David Moyes (West Ham).

The English Women's Super League incorporated tributes ahead of their matches the same weekend, which was the opening weekend of their season. Three Premier League fixtures from the weekend – Crystal Palace-Brighton, Leeds United-Manchester United and Chelsea-Liverpool – were postponed due to policing issues as resources were allocated to the Queen's state funeral at Westminster Abbey on Monday, 19 September. At all Premier League and Women's Super League matches, video screens and perimeter boards displayed tribute images to Elizabeth II and flags were flown at half-mast.

In Scotland, the football governing body issued guidance on 12 September stating that clubs may wish to hold a period of silence as a mark of respect. In one match on 17 September a minute silence was booed and disrupted by "Lizzie's in a box" chants by a section of Dundee United F.C. fans to the tune of the KC and the Sunshine Band song 'Give It Up'. St Mirren then announced prior to their game against Celtic that a minute's applause would be observed instead. Earlier that week, UEFA opened disciplinary procedures against Celtic for the display of a banner reading "Fuck the Crown" and some believe St Mirren opted against a minute's silence in the hope that clapping would drown out anticipated boos. In response, Celtic fans chanted "If you hate the Royal Family clap your hands" throughout the minute of applause and unfurled a banner with the same message. The incident was televised live on Sky Sports and commentator Ian Crocker immediately apologised to viewers for any offence caused. Although footage avoided the Celtic away end where the banner could be seen, the message was audibly received above any applause as the cameras simultaneously cut to players and fans clapping. The Daily Mail had alleged Sky Sports production staff were instructed to turn down sound volume if Celtic fans began to sing about the Queen.

In continental football several minute's of silence were interrupted, such as a UEFA Europa League group stage match in St. Gallen, Switzerland between Arsenal and FC Zürich, as well as a UEFA Conference League group stage match in Edinburgh between Hearts and İstanbul Başakşehir F.K.. During a UEFA Europa Conference League group stage match in Dublin between Shamrock Rovers F.C. and Djurgårdens IF Fotboll, several Shamrocks fans were heard chanting "Lizzy's in a box" to the tune of the KC and the Sunshine Band song 'Give It Up'. A history of anti-British sentiment exists in Ireland due to events such as the plantations of Ireland, the Great Famine and The Troubles. Some sporting events were able to hold tributes without interruption, such as a UEFA Europa League match between Manchester United F.C. and Real Sociedad at Old Trafford in Manchester, and a UEFA Europa Conference League match between West Ham United F.C. and FCSB at the London Stadium.

Rangers defied UEFA's ban on playing national anthems to pay their respects before a Champions League match on 14 September. The club, alongside Manchester City F.C. and Chelsea, had previously asked UEFA to do so but ultimately were refused. Despite ignoring UEFA's decision, Rangers did not face any disciplinary proceedings.

The Scottish national team were granted special permission by UEFA to hold a minute's applause before their Nations League match against Ukraine—although a minority of boos were heard around the stadium.

=== Cricket ===
The first day of the final Test between England and South Africa at The Oval had been scheduled for 8 September 2022, but was rained off after England won the toss, and the second day of play was cancelled as a mark of respect to the Queen. Play began on the third day with tributes paid to the Queen, including a minute's silence followed by the playings of "God Save the King" and "Nkosi Sikelel' iAfrika". Both the teams and match officials were wearing black armbands.

=== Other and international sport ===
Prior to the second Australian Football League semi-final between Melbourne and Brisbane at the Melbourne Cricket Ground, between an Australian Indigenous Welcome to Country and the performing of "Advance Australia Fair", a minute of silence was observed followed by "God Save the King" to pay respects, remember and reflect on "her grit, humility and devotion to the Commonwealth." The first semi-final between Collingwood and Fremantle at the same venue the next night was also preceded by a minute of silence.

The National Football League held a moment of silence for the Queen prior to the NFL Kickoff Game on the day of Elizabeth II's death between the Buffalo Bills and the Los Angeles Rams at SoFi Stadium.

Formula One held a minute of silence in the paddock for the Queen prior to first free practice session of the Italian Grand Prix at the Monza Circuit. Another minute of silence is also scheduled for the Sunday race itself. Formula One broadcasters Channel 4 and Sky Sports have planned to scale back the broadcast of the Italian Grand Prix by shortening or scrapping parts of the pre-race broadcast. The world feed provided to all broadcasters has also taken a more sombre tone, excluding the theme song and introduction from the beginning of the broadcast. Several team liveries are featuring special decals as a tribute to the Queen. The Supercars Championship also observed a minute of silence at Pukekohe in tribute to Queen. Both Williams drivers Nicholas Latifi and Nyck de Vries had a livery in the halo, resembling the birth and death dates of Elizabeth II.

Super League games did go ahead, with a scheduled playoff match on 9 September, but a moment of silence was observed and all players wore black armbands.

On 12 September, Major League Baseball observed a moment of silence prior to the Tampa Bay Rays-Toronto Blue Jays game at Rogers Centre. During the seventh-inning stretch, "God Save the King" was played prior to "OK Blue Jays." For the remainder of the season, the Blue Jays wore black armbands in Elizabeth II's memory.

== Public ==
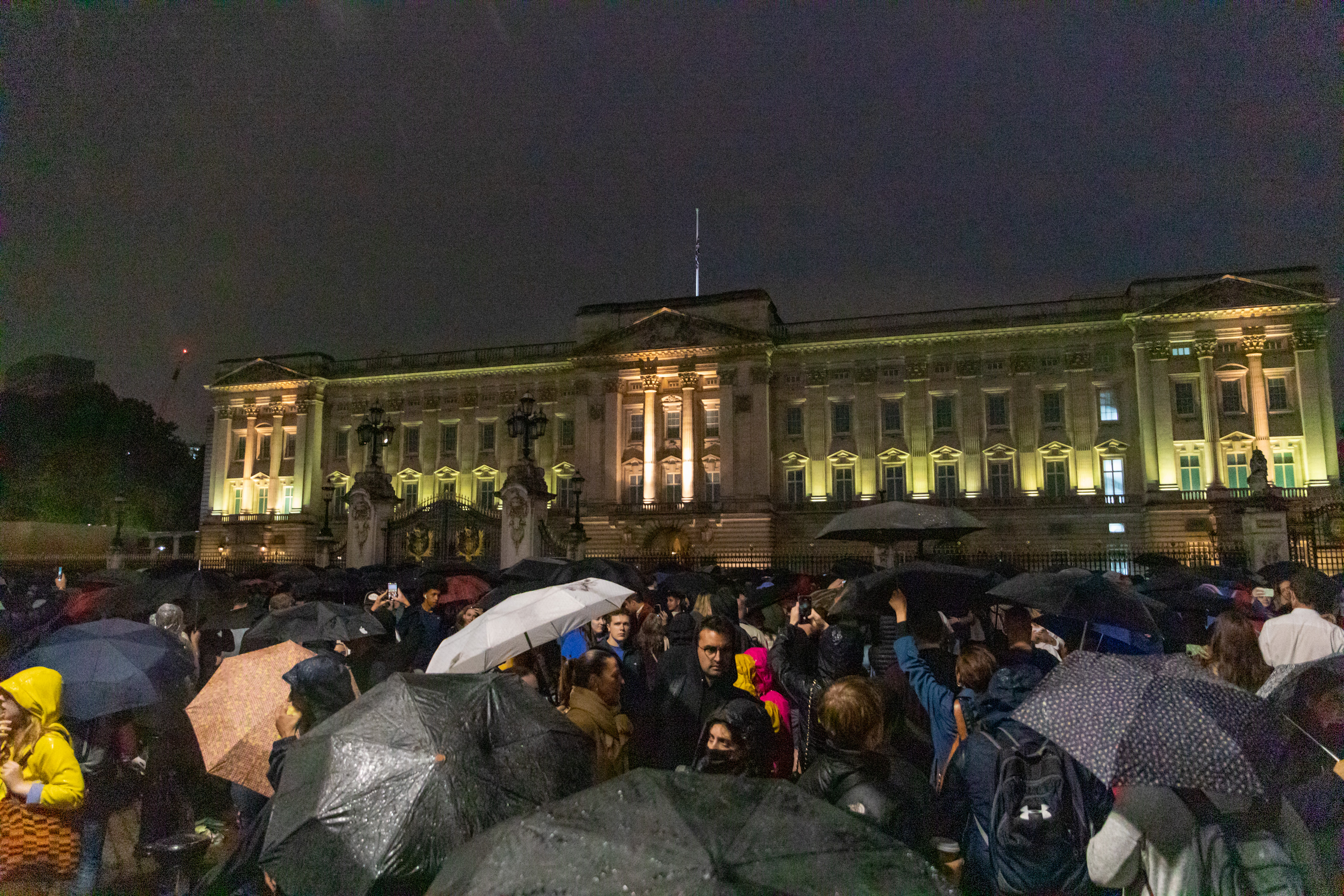
Hundreds of people gathered outside the gates of Buckingham Palace in the rain.

Hundreds of people had gathered outside the gates of Buckingham Palace in London at the time of the announcement. Many others used social media to post condolences and tributes both to the Queen and to the British royal family.

Floral tributes were later left outside Buckingham Palace, Windsor Castle, Sandringham House, Balmoral Castle, the Palace of Holyroodhouse, Hillsborough Castle and Highgrove House. Several black cab drivers lined The Mall with their lights on to pay tribute to the Queen. Numerous books of condolences were set up at libraries and council offices across the UK. In addition to flowers, mourners left Paddington Bear replicas, Corgi soft toys, balloons and marmalade sandwiches at various sites, prompting the Royal Parks to issue a statement, asking mourners to leave only unwrapped flowers, "organic or compostable material", in the interests of sustainability and pest control. It was later announced that the flowers would be gradually picked up and composted for landscaping projects and shrubberies, while around 1,000 Paddington bears and other teddies left by the public at royal residences were cleaned and delivered to the British charity Barnardo's.

It was estimated that more than 700,000 members of the public lined up to see the Queen lying in state and pay their respects. The Palace received over 50,000 letters of condolence from members of the public in the aftermath of her death. Balmoral Castle's grounds remained open until the end of 2022 to allow members of the public to visit and pay their respects.

=== Republicanism ===
Republicans believe support for republicanism is likely to grow in the Commonwealth after Queen Elizabeth's death, particularly in Jamaica and parts of the Caribbean, where anti-royal sentiment is strongest in the Commonwealth. Former director of the Institute of Commonwealth Studies and academic Philip Murphy has suggested that the coronation of Charles may lead to a "rush to the door" for Commonwealth realms to move to republican government. And academics from Australia and New Zealand, such as lecturer on royalty Cindy McCreery and historian Katie Pickles, have explicitly tied public support for the monarchy to Elizabeth's popularity and a personal affection for her.

Gaston Browne said that he aspires for Antigua and Barbuda to become a republic "at some point", and acknowledged that such a move is "not on the cards" for "some time to follow". On 10 September 2022, following the proclamation of Charles III as king, Browne stated that he plans to hold a referendum within three years on becoming a republic.

In Australia, Labor's victory in the 2022 federal election led to new prime minister, Anthony Albanese, appointing Matt Thistlethwaite to the newly created office of Assistant Minister for the Republic, signalling a commitment to prepare Australia for a transition to republic during a second term of Labor government. After the death of Elizabeth II, former prime minister Julia Gillard opined that Australia would inevitably choose to be a republic, but agreed with Albanese's timing on debate about the matter. When asked if he supported another referendum following the Queen's death, Albanese stated it was "not the time" to discuss a republic. Polling conducted after the Queen's death for The Sydney Morning Herald showed an uptick in support for the monarchy. Adam Bandt, leader of the Green Party also expressed his desire for an Australian republic while expressing condolences to the British royal family. In October, Paul Keating claimed that he had discussions with the royal family in the 1990s about stepping down from the Australian crown, but these plans were halted by losing the 1999 Australian republic referendum; he has speculated that Charles may choose to abdicate.

The day after Elizabeth's death, Philip Davis, Prime Minister of The Bahamas, publicly said that a referendum on a Bahamian republic was "always on the table" for his administration. Among popular calls for the poll, he reiterated that willingness days later and Minister of Social Services Obie Wilchcombe expressed his desire for the nation to reject the monarchy.

Elizabeth's death sparked some national debate in Canada around ending the monarchy, which was increasingly unpopular at the end of her reign. In October 2022, Quebec politicians refused to swear an oath of fealty to Charles III, and Bloc Québécois leader Yves-François Blanchet called for severing ties with the monarchy entirely, casting it as "incredibly racist" and the relationship with Canada as "archaic" and "humiliating". In December, Quebec premier François Legault announced legislation to end the oath.

A YouGov poll held on 11 September found that while a majority of Britons support the monarchy's continued existence, only 53% of 25–49-year-olds were in favour and that number dropped to 40% among 18–24-year-olds.

=== Protests ===
Two people were arrested in Scotland for public order offences after protesting against the monarchy and repeated instances of heckling against Prince Andrew, Duke of York during events related to the Queen's death. A Metropolitan Police deputy assistant commissioner said that "the public absolutely have a right of protest and we have been making this clear to all officers involved in the extraordinary policing operation currently in place and we will continue [to] do so".

The Index on Censorship and advocacy group Liberty were both critical of the arrests made in Scotland and England (which was later reversed).

A silent protest took place outside Cardiff Castle during the King's visit on 16 September. As well as placards calling for abolition of the monarchy, the protestors held flags with the emblem of Owain Glyndŵr. The protest was partly against the new King's immediate announcement that his eldest son would take the Prince of Wales title. It was led by various groups of trade unionists, republicans and Welsh nationalist groups, under the banner "Real Democracy Now". Former Senedd member Bethan Sayed (Plaid Cymru) was also to take part.

After certain events and services, such as sports games, medical appointments, and food banks, were cancelled or postponed after the Queen's death, some people in the United Kingdom took to social media to protest against the cancellations and disruption of essential services during the official ten-day mourning period.

Human rights campaigners protested against Britain's inviting Crown Prince of Saudi Arabia Mohammed bin Salman to Elizabeth II's funeral.

== See also ==
- List of national days of mourning (2020–present)
