= Manhattan Jaspers =

Sports teams for Manhattan University

Manhattan Jaspers and Lady Jaspers
- University: Manhattan University
- Nickname: Jaspers
- NCAA: Division I
- Conference: Metro Atlantic Athletic Conference
- Athletic director: Irma Garcia
- Location: Bronx, New York City
- Varsity teams: 19
- Basketball arena: Draddy Gymnasium
- Baseball stadium: Clover Stadium
- Colors: Green and white
- Mascot: Brother Jasper
- Fight song: Onward, Onward Manhattan Jaspers!
- Website: gojaspers.com
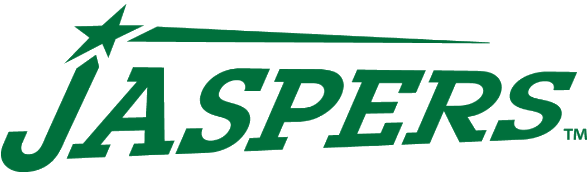

The Manhattan Jaspers are composed of 19 teams representing Manhattan University in intercollegiate athletics. The Jaspers compete in the NCAA Division I and are members of the Metro Atlantic Athletic Conference.

Manhattan University fields 19 Division–I athletic teams for men and women, including basketball, soccer, golf, rugby, baseball and softball, tennis, lacrosse and volleyball. Historically track and field has been the school's strongest sport.

The Jaspers nickname comes from Brother Jasper of Mary, F.S.C., who was a memorable figure at the school. He was head of resident students, athletic director, and baseball coach during the late 1800s.

== Sponsored sports ==
Men's sports	Women's sports
Baseball	Basketball
Basketball	Crew
Crew	Cross Country
Cross Country	Lacrosse
Golf	Soccer
Lacrosse	Softball
Soccer	Swimming & diving
Swimming & diving	Tennis
Track and Field^{†}	Track and Field^{†}
Volleyball	Volleyball
† – Track and field includes both indoor and outdoor.

=== Baseball ===
The college annually played the New York Giants (who moved to San Francisco in the 1950s) in the late 1880s and into the 1890s at the Polo Grounds and Manhattan is credited by the Baseball Hall of Fame with the practice of the "seventh inning stretch" spreading from there into major league baseball. It is written in the Baseball Hall of Fame that "During one particularly warm and humid day when Manhattan College was playing a semi-pro baseball team called the Metropolitans at a park near 107th street, Brother Jasper noticed the Manhattan students were becoming restless and edgy as Manhattan came to bat in the seventh inning of a close game. To relieve the tension, Brother Jasper called time-out and told the students to stand up and stretch for a few minutes until the game resumed." In 1982, The New York Times reported that almost 800 alumni stood in unison at a dinner to honor the 100th anniversary of Brother Jasper Brennan's seventh inning stretch.

Luis Castro, a Manhattan University alumnus, was the first Latin American born player to play in Major League Baseball in the United States, and the first Latin American since Cuban player Esteban Bellán in 1873 to play professional baseball.

On July 15, 2014, it was announced that Manhattan University's baseball team will use Dutchess Stadium as their home field. The field used at Van Cortland Park through 2014 was not meeting NCAA standards. The college looked into building their own field in The Bronx, but the land costs alone did not make such a project feasible.

In 2020, the school's baseball team moved back to the refurbished ball field at Van Cortland Park. Since the move was announced, there have been proposals to name Van Cortland Park's "field of dreams" after 1975 Manhattan graduate Joe Coppo. On the morning of Sept. 11, 2001, Coppo was trapped in the north tower of the World Trade Center when the first plane struck, and he never made it out.

=== Basketball ===
Manhattan University has been playing basketball since 1904. Today the team's coach is John Gallagher. He previously served as the head coach at the University of Hartford from 2010 until 2022.

College basketball has always been a popular sport in the New York metropolitan area and interest in the sport expanded with the start of the National Invitation Tournament (NIT) in 1938. The NIT is considered the first national college basketball championship tournament and for years it was always played at Madison Square Garden. In 1940, Manhattan was one of five New York City colleges and universities that took over administration of the tournament. This arrangement was in place until 2005 when the National Collegiate Athletic Association (NCAA) purchased the rights to the NIT. Before the college's current home court, Draddy Gymnasium, was built in 1978, Manhattan hosted the majority of its home games at Madison Square Garden. Probably the team's greatest victory came at the end of the 1957–58 season when Manhattan upset the top seed West Virginia Mountaineers, led by Jerry West, in the first round of the NCAA tournament.

With a record of 300–205, coach Ken Norton has the most wins in school history. When he was hired in 1946, Norton succeeded basketball coach Honey Russell. Norton also coached baseball and golf, and was the school’s athletic director when he retired in 1979. In 1977, he led the Jaspers to the Metropolitan Golf Association (MGA) Intercollegiate Championship.

Fran Fraschilla was head coach of the Jaspers from 1992 to 1996, and his teams had an 85–35 record, a 71% won-lost percentage, and won two Metro Atlantic Athletic Conference (MAAC) titles and the 1993 MAAC men's basketball tournament championship. In 1995 the Jaspers became the first Jaspers team in 35 years to compete in the NCAA Basketball Tournament and the first team from the MAAC to obtain an at-large bid to the NCAA Tournament. There, they defeated the fourth-seeded Oklahoma Sooners in the first round, before losing in the second round to the Arizona State Sun Devils. Fraschilla was named the 1994–95 Metro Atlantic Athletic Conference Men's Basketball Coach of the Year, after his team's 26-5 season.

From 2011 to 2022, the team's coach was Steve Masiello. Masiello was an assistant coach at Manhattan in the early 2000s and came back to the school as head coach in 2011. During the 2013–2014 season, the Jaspers beat Iona in the MAAC Conference final and went on to play the University of Louisville in the first round of the NCAA tournament in a highly publicized game where Masiello coached against one of his mentors, Rick Pitino. During the 2014–15 season, the Jaspers again defeated Iona in the MAAC Conference final to earn their second straight trip to the NCAA tournament, where they lost to Hampton University in the play-in game for the round of 64.

The Lady Jaspers' first campaign was the 1978–79 season under head coach Michelle Blatt. The Lady Jaspers current head coach is Heather Vulin. An assistant coach at Virginia Tech, Vulin came to Manhattan in 2016.

=== Football ===
Manhattan University had a football program from 1924–1942. The college team posted an all-time record of 194 wins, 198 losses and 22 ties. The final coach for the school's football team was Herbert M. Kopf. After the 1942 season, the school suspended intercollegiate football competition for World War II and then did not reactivate the program after completion of the war. The team was invited to the first ever Miami Palm Festival Game, predecessor to the Orange Bowl, played on January 2, 1933, University of Miami defeated Manhattan University, 7–0. The team was revived in 1965 in the form of a club team, and existed until 1987.

=== Lacrosse ===
The school participated in the first intercollegiate lacrosse game in the United States, playing New York University on November 22, 1877.

Manhattan's lacrosse program became Division I in 1996 playing in the Metro Atlantic Athletic Conference (MAAC). They have qualified for the MAAC tournament 7 times (2000, 2002, 2004, 2005 and 2008–2010). In 2002 the Jaspers went undefeated in the MAAC (9–0), and won the MAAC Championship. They finished with an 11–6 record. The Jaspers earned a bid to the NCAA Playoffs in 2002, playing Georgetown. They fell to Georgetown 12–7 in the first round of the NCAAs. The program has produced a number of ALL-MAAC players.

The Lady Jaspers have won three MAAC Lacrosse Championships (2000, 2004, 2005).

The Jaspers and Lady Jaspers home field is the historic Gaelic Park.

=== Rowing ===
Manhattan University's rowing program holds much history, as well. The school is one of the original eight founding members of the Aberdeen Dad Vail Regatta, the largest collegiate regatta in the United States. The race attracts over one hundred colleges and universities from the U.S. and Canada and thousands of student-athletes on the second Saturday of May. The team's coach, Allen Walz, along with the school's football coach at the time, Herbert M. Kopf, served as stewards to the regatta. In 1936 and 1938, Manhattan was one of two teams competing in the regatta, the other being Rutgers, on the Harlem River, where the team trains today. Both the men's and women's teams still compete in the Dad Vail Regatta today, as well as in the MAAC Championships, N.Y. State Championships, Knecht Cup and the C.R.A.S.H. B's World Indoor Rowing Championships.

=== Track and field ===
The Manhattan University Track and Field program has the richest athletic tradition in the school, amassing a total of 31 out of a possible 32 MAAC Indoor/Outdoor Track titles. In 1973, Manhattan University won the Indoor NCAA Championship along with setting a world record in the distance medley relay. Manhattan was also home to former American Record holder in the 5,000m Matthew Centrowitz Sr. The program was run by legendary coach/runner Fred Dwyer, who ran a 4:00.3 mile while at Villanova. Manhattan still remains a powerhouse on the east coast as one of the top programs around. Dan Mecca, men's and women's track and field head coach, was promoted to men's and women's cross country and track and field coach in 1993 after coaching the Jaspers' men's field events since 1986. During his 36 years, Manhattan won 17 MAAC Men's Indoor Team Titles, 14 Men's Outdoor Titles, 13 Women's Indoor Titles, 11 Women's Outdoor Titles, five MAAC women's Cross Country titles, and one IC4A men's indoor title. under the direction of Dan Mecca. Currently, Kerri Gallagher is in her seventh year at Manhattan University and her second as the program's Director of Cross Country, Track and Field. Gallagher, who was promoted to director in May 2021, was named head coach of Manhattan's men's & women's cross country, mid-distance and distance programs in July 2016.

Van Cortlandt Park, which is located near the college, is a prominent site for cross-country running. The park's trails are some of the most utilized cross-country courses in the country and is the venue for the annual IC4A or Intercollegiate Association of Amateur Athletes of America (ICAAAA) cross country championships. The 1968 and 1969 NCAA Men's Division I Cross Country Championships were hosted by Manhattan at Van Cortlandt.

==== 1973 NCAA title ====
Manhattan won the 1973 NCAA Indoor Track and Field Championships becoming the smallest school to win a Division I track title. Led by 1972 Olympians Anthony Colon of Puerto Rico and Michael Keogh of Ireland, the Jaspers won the title with 18 points and a 6-point margin.

== Rivalries ==
Manhattan has long maintained rivalries with several local, and MAAC opponents. The Jaspers' most notable rivals are the Fordham University Rams, with whom they compete in the "Battle of the Bronx", and the Iona Gaels. The Jaspers also maintain a very strong rivalry with the Saint Peter's Peacocks and Siena Saints.

== See also ==
- List of Manhattan University alumni § Sports
- Manhattan Jaspers basketball
- Manhattan Lady Jaspers basketball
- Sports in the New York metropolitan area
