= Bill Krohn =

American runner (born 1958)

Personal information
- Nationality: American
- Born: March 9, 1958 (age 68) Norwich, Connecticut

Sport
- Sport: Track
- Events: 1500 meters, 3000 meters, 5000 meters
- College team: Manhattan College

Achievements and titles
- Personal bests: 1500m: 3:41.17; Mile: 4:00.6; 3000m: 7:50.27; 5000m: 13:25.61

Bill Krohn (born March 9, 1958) is an American runner who specialized in the 1500 meters, 3000 meters, and 5000 meters. After taking up running at Norwich Free Academy and competing with the Manhattan College track team, he competed for the United States. Later on he competed as an elite masters-level athlete.

== Running career ==
=== High school ===
Krohn attended high school at Norwich Free Academy, where he ran cross country and track, and graduated with the class of 1976. While at the Free Academy, Krohn was coached by Gene McGrath. By the time he graduated from NFA he had recorded personal bests of 4:16 in the mile and 9:20 for two miles. In his senior year, he ran in the mile race at the State LL championships, where coach Fred Dwyer from Manhattan College intended on recruiting Jody Weatherwax, who was the favorite to win the race. Krohn ended up winning the LL state mile in 4:17 ahead of Weatherwax, and Dwyer, who allegedly had only one athletic scholarship left to give, offered it to Krohn.

=== Collegiate ===
At the time Krohn was recruited to Manhattan College, they were one of the most respected track programs in the United States. In the years before they had consistent success from their recruits, such as Michael Keogh and Anthony Colón. When Krohn graduated from Manhattan College in 1980, he had recorded 4:06 in the mile and 8:48 for two miles.

=== Professional ===
"A guy in a raincoat came up to me in the stadium tunnel and handed me 500 dollars in an envelope and said 'nice race'. I was completely surprised, but that was the way things were done in the 80's."

— Bill Krohn, March 2008

Krohn linked up with coach Mike Barnow at Westchester Track Club, where he trained for various distances. Barnow's training program at Westchester TC was such that Krohn trained approximately 55–60 miles per week, with an emphasis on running on dirt and grass. On July 26, 1981, Krohn won the Dannon (race sponsor) 7-mile race around the Titicus Reservoir in a time of 33 minutes, 47 seconds, setting a course record in the process. At the second annual Greater Boston Track Club Invitational in 1983, Krohn won the indoor mile at Harvard University's indoor facility in 4:02.8. On July 27, 1985, Krohn ran his lifetime best 5000 meters in Oslo, Norway, in a race which was won by Saïd Aouita. That day, Krohn's 13:25.61 had him finish in 10th place in a deep international field.

=== Masters ===
As soon as Krohn turned 40, he qualified for the M40-44 Masters category, and made his masters debut at the 1999 World Masters Athletics Championships in Gateshead, where he placed second in the 1500 meters. On July 17, 1999, he recorded 3:52 in the 1500 meters.

== Personal life ==
Krohn and his Gunnel have two children, Kevin and Kajsa. Since 1995, they have lived in Stockholm, Sweden.
