= Peter Hardy =

Peter Hardy may refer to:

- Peter Hardy, Baron Hardy of Wath (1931–2003), British Labour Party politician
- Peter Hardy (actor) (1957–2023), Australian actor
- Peter Hardy (baseball executive) (1917–1997), Canadian brewer and baseball executive
- Peter Hardy (historian) (1922–2013), British academic
