= Keith Hampshire =

British singer (born 1945)

- Born: 23 November 1945 (age 80); Dulwich, London, England
- Occupations: Singer; actor
- Years active: 1960s–present

Keith Hampshire (born 23 November 1945) is an English-born singer and actor. He recorded three songs which were top ten hits in Canada, and hosted the CBC Television show Keith Hampshire's Music Machine. His voice has been compared to David Clayton-Thomas. In the United States his highest charting single,"Daytime Night-time", reached No. 51 on Hot 100.

== Early life ==
Hampshire was born in Dulwich, London, England. His family moved to Canada when he was six-years-old, settling in Calgary. Growing up, he took singing lessons, and formed several short-lived high-school bands which performed in local venues.

== Career ==
After graduating from high school, Hampshire began working as a radio disc jockey. Between July 1966 and mid-August 1967, he lived in the UK and was a DJ for the offshore pirate radio station Radio Caroline South. His show was called "Keefer's Commotions", and later "Keefer's Uprising".

Beginning in 1971, Hampshire recorded a number of pop music singles. His version of "The First Cut Is the Deepest" reached No. 1 on the RPM 100 national singles chart in May 1973, earning him a nomination for Best Male Vocalist at the Juno Awards.

In 1973, Hampshire became the host of the CBC Television show Keith Hampshire's Music Machine.

In 1981, Hampshire released an album, Variations, through Freedom Records.

In 1983, Hampshire, with the Bat Boys, recorded a song entitled "OK Blue Jays" which became an unofficial anthem for the Toronto Blue Jays Major League Baseball team. Blue Jays fans frequently sing it during the seventh-inning stretch of home games. The song was written by Alan Smith, Pat Arbour, Jack Lenz and Tony Kosinec. The song was remixed by Rob Wells and Chris Anderson of Big Honkin' Spaceship Inc. in 2003.

On 18 June 2005, Hampshire was hired to host a 1960s–1970s based oldies radio show on CHAY-FM in Barrie, Ontario. That year 20th Century Masters released an album of his past singles, The Millennium Collection: The Best of Keith Hampshire.

== Filmography ==
- 1972-1973: Festival of Family Classics - Additional voices
- 1983: Rock & Rule - Other Computers
- 1986: Madballs: Escape from Orb! - Hornhead
- 1987: Madballs: Gross Jokes - Hornhead / British Narrator
- 1987: The Care Bears Adventure in Wonderland - Madhatter / Jabberwocky
- 1987-1988: The Care Bears Family - Mr. Dragon / Shakey the Sea Serpent / Songfellow Strum
- 1989: Beetlejuice - Additional voices
- 1989-1991: Babar - Additional voices
- 1990: The Nutcracker Prince - Mouse / Guest / Second Guard / Contestant / Spectator / Soldier
- 1990-1991: The Raccoons - Pig One (Lloyd)
- 1991-1992: The Adventures of Tintin - Additional voices (English version)
- 1993-1994: The Busy World of Richard Scarry - Additional voices
- 1994: Monster Force - Additional voices
- 1998: Laura's Happy Adventures - Mr. Morris
- 2001-2002: Pecola - Additional voices (English version)

== Discography ==
=== Singles ===
- 1967 - "Millions of Hearts" (b/w Lonely Boy)
- 1971 - "Ebenezer" (b/w Sing Angel Sing) (#81 Canada)
- 1972 - "Daytime Night-time" (b/w Turned the Other Way) (#5 Canada),(#51 US)
- 1973 - "The First Cut Is the Deepest" (b/w You Can't Hear the Song I Sing) (#1 Canada), (#70 US), (#13 New Zealand)
- 1973 - "Big Time Operator" (b/w You Can't Hear the Song I Sing) (#5 Canada), (#81 US)
- 1974 - "For Ever and Ever" (b/w Jeraboah) (#47 Canada)
- 1974 - "Hallelujah Freedom" (b/w Waking Up Alone) (#59 Canada)
- 1976 - "I'm Into Something Good" (b/w Just Another Fool)
- 1981 - "I Can't Wait Too Long" (b/w Nobody's Child)
- 1983 - "OK Blue Jays" (b/w same) (#47 Canada) - as "The Bat Boys"

=== Albums ===
- 1972 - Oops! (original cast recording)
- 1973 - The First Cut
- 1981 - Variations
- 2005 - The Best of Keith Hampshire: The Millennium Collection
