= Bavasi =

Bavasi is a surname. Notable people with the surname include:

- Bill Bavasi (born 1957), American Major League Baseball general manager
- Buzzie Bavasi (1914–2008), American Major League Baseball executive
- Peter Bavasi (born 1942), American Major League Baseball executive
