= Ronald M. Shapiro =

American attorney and sports agent

Ron Shapiro
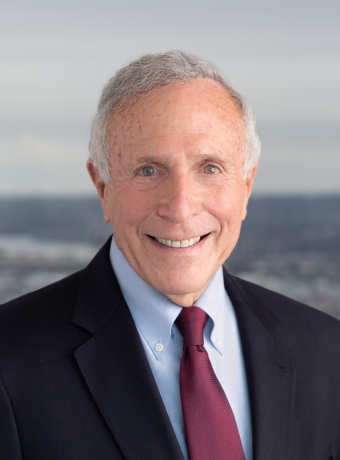
- Shapiro in 2022
- Born: March 29, 1943 (age 83); Philadelphia, Pennsylvania, U.S.
- Education: Haverford College; Harvard Law School (JD)
- Occupations: Chairman, Shapiro Advisors, LLC
- Website: shapirosher.com

Ronald M. Shapiro (born March 29, 1943) is an American attorney, businessman, sports agent and author.

== Biography ==
Shapiro was born on March 29, 1943, in Philadelphia, Pennsylvania, to Mark and Lillian Shapiro. He grew up in neighboring Cheltenham Township and graduated from Cheltenham High School in 1960. Shapiro then attended Haverford College and graduated cum laude from Harvard Law School in 1967.

== Career ==
Shapiro founded Shapiro Sher in 1972. The company has provided services related to business law, litigation insurance and bankruptcy, as well as sports and entertainment law.

From 1972 to 1974, Shapiro served as Maryland State Securities Commissioner. Subsequently, in 1976, Shapiro founded Shapiro, Robinson & Associates, a sports management firm.”

In the 1980s, Shapiro helped settle a symphony orchestra strike.

In 1995, he founded Shapiro Negotiations Institute, a negotiation seminar and consulting firm. And, in 2017, he created Shapiro Advisors, LLC, a negotiation deal coaching and consulting company.

Shapiro appeared as a negotiations expert on ABC's Good Morning America, CNBC's Power Lunch, and National Public Radio's Morning Edition and Talk of the Nation. He also hosted Front Page and Special Edition on NBC's Baltimore affiliates and was a panelist on Square Off on CBS's Baltimore affiliate.

He taught at the Johns Hopkins University, the University of Maryland School of Law, the University of Baltimore School of Law, and spoke in the Harvard Law School Traphagen Distinguished Alumni Speaker Series. Shapiro was named the 1996 Edward B. Shils Lecturer in Arbitration and Alternative Dispute Resolution at the University of Pennsylvania Law School. Shapiro has chaired over 25 boards of charitable and community organizations, including Peace Players International, the Johns Hopkins Children's Center, and the University of Maryland Greenebaum Cancer Center Advisory Board, the Johns Hopkins Department of Psychiatry Advisory Board, as well as serving on several others. He was also Treasurer and Finance Chairman for former Baltimore Mayor Kurt Schmoke. Shapiro has received special honors and recognition, including American Sportscasters Association Hall of Fame Mel Allen Service Award. The Ronald M. Shapiro Research Award and Lecture was established in recognition of Shapiro's service at the Greenebaum Cancer Center of the University of Maryland. In June 2003, Stevenson University awarded Shapiro the Honorary Doctor of Humane Letters degree. In 2013, Shapiro received the American Red Cross of the Chesapeake Region's Lifetime Achievement Award, was inducted into the Baltimore Jewish Hall of Fame,

In 2013 Mr. Shapiro. also was named as a member of The Champions: Pioneers and Innovators in Sports Business by SportsBusiness Journal and SportsBusiness Daily.

In 2017, Shapiro founded Shapiro Advisors, LLC, a negotiation coaching and consulting firm. In 2018, Shapiro was inducted into the Baltimore Sun's Maryland Business and Civic Hall of Fame.

=== Books ===
In October 1998, Shapiro's book, The Power of Nice: How To Negotiate So Everyone Wins- Especially You! was published. The book was excerpted in Fortune Magazine. Shapiro's second book, Bullies, Tyrants & Impossible People: How To Beat Them Without Joining Them, published in 2005, made The Wall Street Journal's best seller list in its first week of publication. Shapiro's third book, Dare To Prepare: How To Win Before You Begin, published by Crown in January 2008, His book appeared on the best-seller lists of The New York Times, Business Week, and The Wall Street Journal. It was also declared as the winner in two categories at the National Best Books 2008 Awards by USA Book News and received a gold medal in the Success & Motivation category at the 2009 Axiom Business Book Awards.

Shapiro's fourth book, Perfecting Your Pitch: How To Succeed In Business And In Life By Finding Words That Work, was released in November 2013.

Shapiro authored more than 20 law journal articles; co-authored books on corporate and securities law; founded Maryland's major bar review course; and began a legal publishing company.

== Personal life ==
Shapiro is the father of 4 children Mark Shapiro, the president of the Toronto Blue Jays; Julie Mangini, an executive coach and lawyer who is married to Eric Mangini, former head coach of the New York Jets and Cleveland Browns. David Shapiro, the CEO of the YMCA of Greater Boston, and Laura Dulac, the Founder and chairperson of the charity, Our Children Making Change.
