= OK Blue Jays =

Song by Keith Hampshire and "The Bat Boys"
- Released: 1983
- Studio: Eastern Sound
- Genre: Pop, Fight song
- Composers: Jack Lenz and Tony Kosinec
- Lyricists: Alan Smith, Pat Arbour
- Producers: Jack Lenz and Tony Kosinec

"OK Blue Jays" is a pop baseball fight song played during the seventh-inning stretch of home games of the Toronto Blue Jays, a Major League Baseball team based in the city of Toronto, Ontario, Canada. The song includes references to the team's roster and events from the 1980s, and is played after the horn blows at the Rogers Centre. It was released in 1983 and charted 47th on RPM's singles list. Music was written by Jack Lenz and Tony Kosinec and is performed by Keith Hampshire and "The Bat Boys". The song was remixed by Rob Wells and Chris Anderson in 2003.

By 1986, the single had sold over 50,000 copies and was certified gold. The single was released in May 1983 on the Kosinec/Lenz label, with A&M picking up distribution the following year. In a pre-game ceremony in 1986, Jimy Williams, who was the team manager at the time, accepted a gold record from a recording industry representative before a game against the Milwaukee Brewers.

== Overview ==
The Blue Jays song was conceptualized by Alan Smith, Creative Director at JWT Direct. He wrote most of the lyrics together with copywriter Pat Arbour, although the first verse was written entirely by recording artist Tony Kosinec of the Lenz/Kosinec jingle house, which was hired to write the music and produce the song under Smith and Arbour's direction. The project was approved and supported by Blue Jays executive Paul Beeston. Lenz stated that Beeston "wanted the song to be fun, but not to promise too much because the team was OK".

The original version of the song was about two and a half minutes long, but the version played during the seventh-inning stretch is 58 seconds long. During its play, the Blue Jays JForce cheerleaders lead fans in simple stretching activities, such as clapping and fist-pumping. When the song was first introduced in 1983, a group from Fitness Ontario would lead fans in calisthenics exercises.

The song refers to eight teams; in order, they are the Chicago White Sox, Boston Red Sox, Los Angeles Angels, Texas Rangers, New York Yankees, Cleveland Indians (now Guardians), Detroit Tigers, and the (then-Oakland) Athletics. The original version referred to the Milwaukee Brewers instead of the Los Angeles Angels.

Two individuals are mentioned by their given name only. The first is Dave Stieb, about whom the song states:

Dave's put down a smoker
A strike
And you've got no doubt
(You're out!)

The lyrics were later changed to "Jays throw down a smoker".

The second individual mentioned is "Billy", referring to Billy Martin, who had been the manager of the Oakland Athletics in 1982 and had his third stint as manager of the New York Yankees in 1983.

We'll beat the A's so bad it'll make Billy blue

The refrain of the song is:

OK Blue Jays!
Let's play ball!

The song ends with the sound of a bat swung by Willie Upshaw striking a pitched baseball.

== Personnel ==
=== The Bat Boys ===
- Barry Keane – drums
- Mike Francis – guitar
- Roly Platt – harmonicas
- David Sawyer – bass
- Denis Le Page – banjo
- Jack Lenz – piano and background vocals
- Ralph Fraser – stadium organ
- Keith Hampshire – lead and background vocals
- Tony Kosinec – background vocals
- Laurie Bower – background vocals

=== Production ===
- Recording by Don Geppert at Eastern Sound
- Additional recording and mixing by John Naslen at Manta Sound
