= Mark Shapiro (sports executive) =

American baseball executive (born 1967)

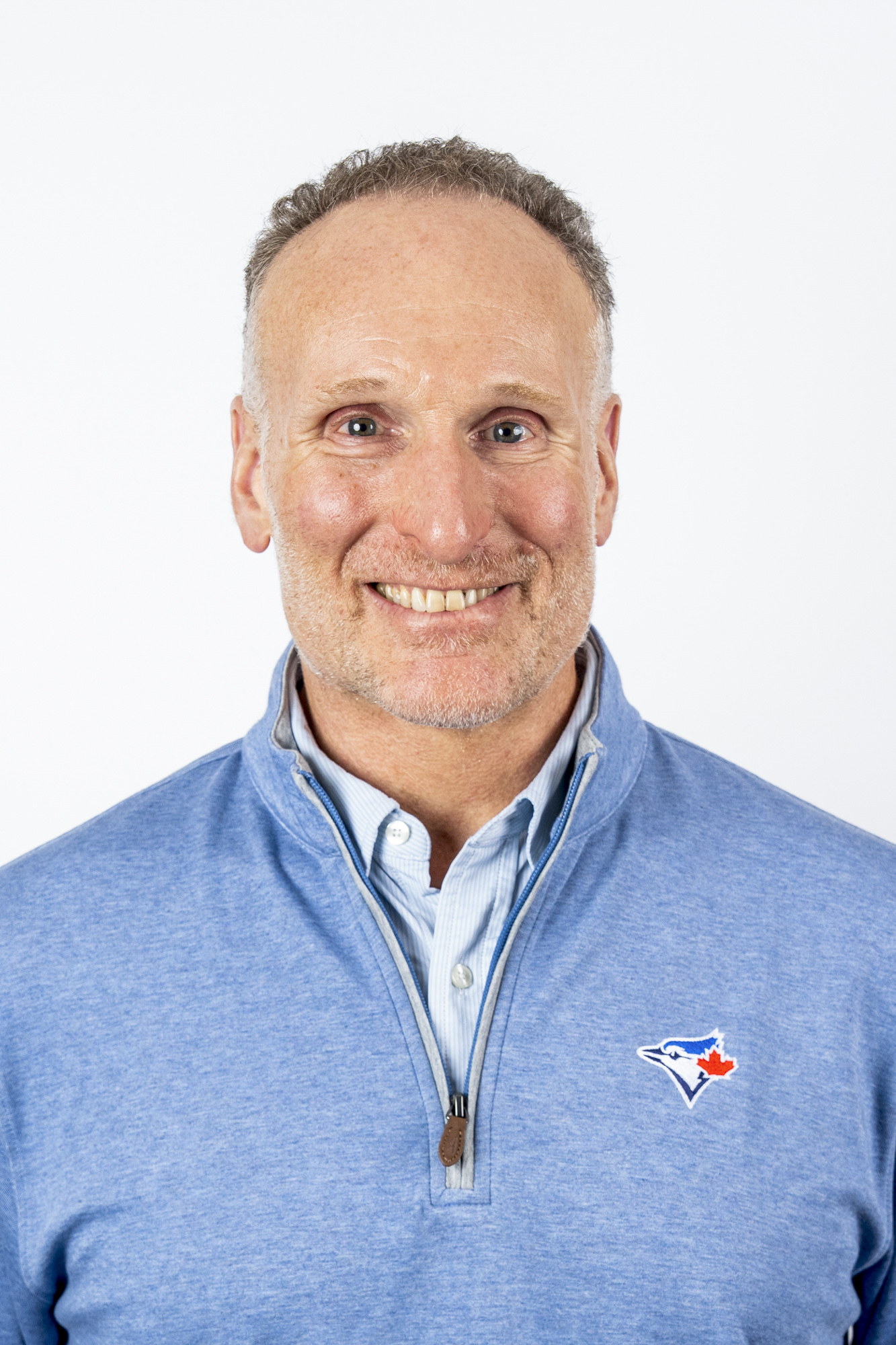
- Born: April 3, 1967 (age 59); Cambridge, Massachusetts, U.S.
- Citizenship: United States, Canada
- Education: Princeton University (1989)
- Occupations: Toronto Blue Jays team president and CEO
- Father: Ronald M. Shapiro
- Awards: Sporting News Executive of the Year (2005, 2007)

Mark Shapiro (/ʃəˈpaɪroʊ/; born April 3, 1967) is an American-born Canadian baseball executive, who since 2015 has been president and CEO of the Toronto Blue Jays of Major League Baseball (MLB) following 24 seasons with the Cleveland Indians.

== Early life ==
Shapiro was born in Cambridge, Massachusetts, on April 3, 1967. He is the son of Ronald M. Shapiro, an attorney and sports agent in Baltimore. He graduated from the Gilman School in 1985, after playing first base for the baseball team, and Princeton University in 1989 with a degree in history, after playing center and offensive tackle for the Princeton Tigers football team.

== Baseball career ==
=== Cleveland Indians ===
Wanting to work in baseball, Shapiro wrote to all 26 baseball teams but didn’t receive much of a response. In 1991, John Hart and Dan O'Dowd of the Cleveland Indians offered him a job. After starting in an untitled position, Shapiro worked his way up from player development director to Assistant General Manager, and in 2001 became general manager. At the end of the 2010 season, he became the Cleveland Indians team president, with Chris Antonetti succeeding Shapiro as general manager.

In his time at the Indians, they won 6 division titles and 2 American League Championships losing the 1995 and 1997 World Series.

Shapiro was named Executive of the Year by the Sporting News in 2005 and 2007, following 90+ wins seasons by the Indians, including an American League Central Division Championship in 2007.

=== Toronto Blue Jays ===
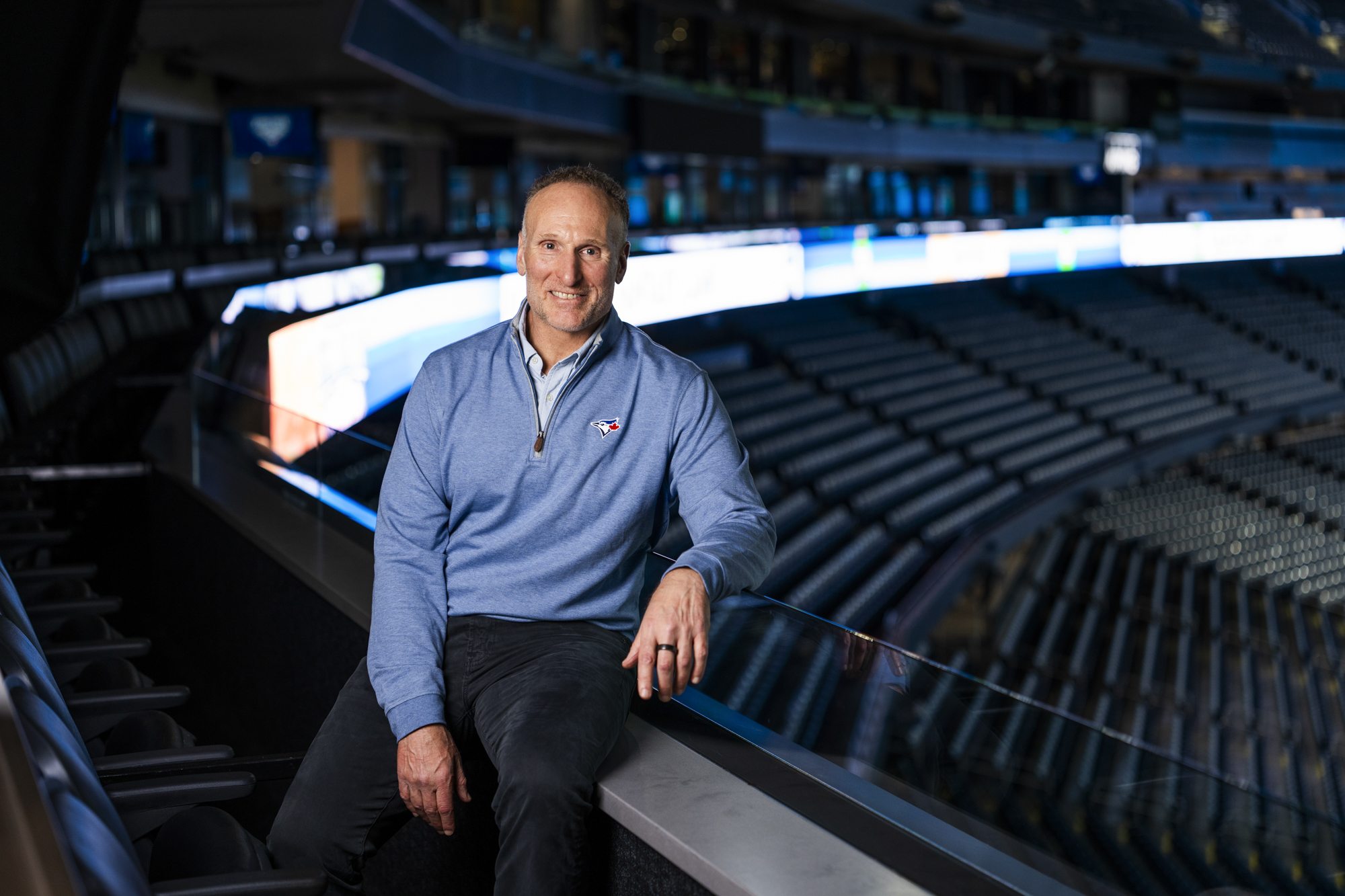
Toronto Blue Jays President Mark Shapiro

On August 31, 2015, The Toronto Blue Jays announced that Shapiro would become their new president and chief executive officer (CEO) at the end of the 2015 season, succeeding Paul Beeston. Shapiro did not formally begin working in the new role until October 31, the same day that Beeston retired. In December 2015, Shapiro hired Ross Atkins to be the team's sixth general manager.

Shapiro oversaw two major renovation projects: the player development complex in Dunedin, Florida and the renovations of the Rogers Centre.

On December 12, 2025, Shapiro and the Blue Jays agreed to a five-year contract extension.

In Shapiro’s time at the Blue Jays they reached the postseason five times including a first American League Championship in 32 years.

=== MLB Committees ===
From 2010-14, Shapiro served on Commissioner Selig’s Special Committee for On-Field Matters. In 2015, he was named to the Competition Committee, which helped introduce the Automated Ball-Strike System, replay challenges and the pitch clock.

He has also served on the Revenue Sharing Definitions Committee, the Strategic Planning Committee, and the MLB Ticketing Committee.

He represents the Blue Jays at MLB owners’ meetings.

=== Eye for talent ===
Shapiro played a role in a number of current baseball executives such as Chris Antonetti, Mike Chernoff, Ross Atkins, Derek Falvey, Mike Hazen, Neal Huntington and David Stearns getting their break in baseball.

=== Board Membership ===
He sits on the Board of Directors for Jays Care Foundation, and is on the board of the Positive Coaching Alliance.

== Awards ==
- Two-time Sporting News Executive of the Year (2005, 2007)
- Honorary Doctor of Letters from Baldwin Wallace University (2014)
- 2007 American League Central Division Champion (as Indians Executive VP/GM)
- 2007 Sports Business Journal 40 under 40
- 2007 Baseball America’s "10 to Watch"
- 2025 American League East Division Champion
- 2025 American League Champion (as Blue Jays President/CEO)
- 2025 Gate 14 Podcast Executive of the Year (as Blue Jays President/CEO)

== Personal life ==
Shapiro has one son, Caden who was captain of the Princeton baseball team and is hitting coach for the Pittsburgh Pirates Dominican Summer League team and one daughter, Sierra who was on the Dean’s list at Tulane.

Shapiro is a dual American-Canadian citizen. He is the brother-in-law of former Cleveland Browns and New York Jets coach Eric Mangini. Shapiro was played by actor Reed Diamond in the 2011 film Moneyball.

Sporting positions
Preceded by John Hart	Cleveland Indians General Manager; November 1, 2001 – October 3, 2010	Succeeded by Chris Antonetti
Preceded by Paul Beeston	Toronto Blue Jays President and CEO; 2015–present	Succeeded by incumbent
