= Battle of the Bronx =

American college sports rivalry

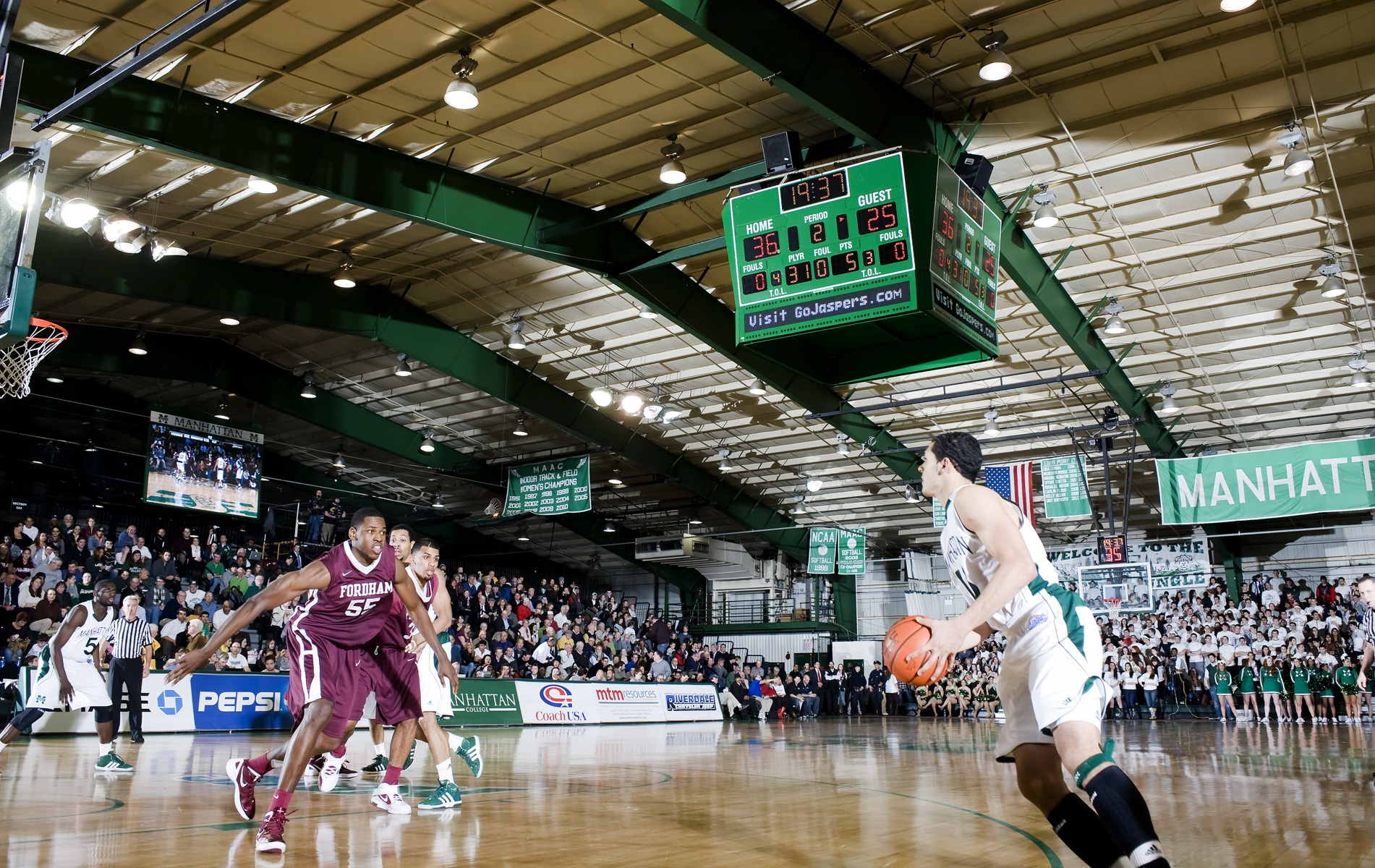
- Fordham and Manhattan men's basketball playing in the 2011 edition of the Battle of the Bronx.

- Fordham Rams Manhattan Jaspers
- Sport: Multi-sport
- First meeting: 1911 (MBB)
- Location of the respective schools in New York City.

The Battle of the Bronx is a college sports rivalry between Manhattan University and Fordham University, two NCAA Division I schools that play in The Bronx district of New York City. The rivalry dates back to the men's basketball teams playing in 1911 and has since grown into a multi-sport rivalry, and one of the largest intra-city college rivalries in New York City.

Manhattan play in the Metro Atlantic Athletic Conference, and Fordham play in the Atlantic 10 Conference.

== History ==
The history of the rivalry dates back to the 1911–12 NCAA basketball season when the Fordham Rams men's basketball and Manhattan Jaspers men's basketball programs squared off. The game was won by Manhattan 20–19, who would dominate the men's basketball series through the remainder of the 1910s. The series between the two basketball programs swayed over the course of the 20th century, with Manhattan dominating the series in the 1930s, 1950, and 1970s; while Fordham dominated the series in the 1920s and 1980s. The men's basketball series of the rivalry given it century-long longevity has been called one of the most storied rivalries in men's college basketball. The rivalry received extensive coverage in 2011 when they met for the 100th year.

In describing the rivalry former Manhattan guard, Tyler Wilson, said "You always have to play a team that's in your city. You always want to beat those teams — want to feel like you're the best team in your area." Chuba Ohams of Fordham said "It's gonna be fun, competitive — you know we're gonna play hard, go at each other."

The rivalry has expanded beyond men's basketball to include all sports programs that both Fordham and Manhattan sponsor. The women's basketball teams have played each other 50 times in their history, with their rivalry dating back to the 1980s.

== Series table ==
Sport	All-time series record	Last result	Next meeting	Ref.
Baseball	Fordham leads 60–26–3	Fordham won 5–4 on April 23, 2025	April 7, 2026 @ Fordham	
Men's basketball	Manhattan leads 58–55	Fordham won 80–61 on November 17, 2026	2027–28 TBA	
Women's Basketball	Fordham leads 27–26	Manhattan won 65–58 on November 20, 2024	2025–26 @ Fordham	
Men's Cross Country		Manhattan won 69–160 on September 8, 2018		
Women's Cross Country		Manhattan won 76–115 on September 8, 2018		
Men's golf		Fordham won 621–626 on October 29, 2018		
Women's Rowing				
Men's soccer	Fordham leads 30–14–3	Manhattan won 2–1 on September 24, 2019	September 2020 @ Manhattan	
Women's soccer	Fordham leads 18–8–1	Fordham won 1–0 on August 27, 2018	August 2020 @ Fordham	
Men's Swimming		Fordham won 161–109 on December 5, 2018	2019 @ Manhattan	
Women's Swimming		Fordham won 182–86 on December 5, 2018	2019 @ Manhattan	
Softball	Fordham leads 28–14	Fordham won 7–3 on April 6, 2010	TBD	
Women's volleyball		Fordham won 3–0 on September 12, 2018		

Series led and games won by Fordham	Series led and games won by Manhattan

== Results ==
=== Men's basketball ===
Fordham victories	Manhattan victories	Tie games

No.	Date	Location	Winner	Score
1	January 7, 1912	Fordham	Manhattan	20–19
2	December 30, 1912	Fordham	Manhattan	35–33
3	January 18, 1913	Fordham	Fordham	37–34
4	January 23, 1913	Fordham	Manhattan	31–30
5	January 11, 1914	Fordham	Manhattan	25–20
6	January 5, 1923	Fordham	Manhattan	26–25
7	January 2, 1924	Fordham	Fordham	45–30
8	January 8, 1925	Fordham	Fordham	39–23
9	January 9, 1926	Manhattan	Fordham	44–23
10	December 30, 1927	Fordham	Fordham	35–22
11	January 6, 1929	Fordham	Fordham	29–18
12	January 3, 1930	Fordham	Fordham	24–22
13	January 7, 1931	Fordham	Manhattan	31–30
14	January 20, 1932	Fordham	Fordham	28–26
15	January 19, 1933	Fordham	Manhattan	35–33
16	January 17, 1934	Fordham	Manhattan	16–14
17	January 2, 1935	Fordham	Fordham	33–27
18	January 3, 1936	Fordham	Manhattan	36–25
19	January 6, 1937	Fordham	Manhattan	29–19
20	January 5, 1938	Fordham	Manhattan	34–31
21	January 6, 1939	Fordham	Manhattan	41–39
22	January 5, 1940	Fordham	Manhattan	41–34
23	January 3, 1941	Fordham	Manhattan	57–47
24	January 2, 1942	Fordham	Fordham	52–38
25	January 6, 1943	Fordham	Fordham	39–31
26	January 18, 1946	Fordham	Manhattan	40–39
27	January 17, 1947	Fordham	Fordham	60–53
28	January 23, 1948	Fordham	Fordham	60–53
29	January 21, 1949	Fordham	Manhattan	57–52
30	January 20, 1950	Fordham	Manhattan	56–55
31	January 19, 1951	Fordham	Fordham	59–49
32	February 1, 1952	Fordham	Manhattan	64–56
33	January 16, 1953	Fordham	Manhattan	80–66
34	January 22, 1954	Fordham	Fordham	73–68
35	February 4, 1955	Fordham	Manhattan	60–55
36	February 17, 1956	Fordham	Manhattan	78–71
37	January 25, 1957	Fordham	Fordham	81–73
38	January 23, 1958	Fordham	Manhattan	69–67
39	February 12, 1959	Fordham	Manhattan	73–64

No.	Date	Location	Winner	Score
40	February 4, 1960	Fordham	Manhattan	91–61
41	February 5, 1961	Manhattan	Manhattan	78–69
42	February 15, 1962	Fordham	Fordham	68–66
43	February 9, 1963	Fordham	Fordham	66–61
44	February 28, 1964	Fordham	Manhattan	67–59
45	March 4, 1965	Fordham	Fordham	67–55
46	February 24, 1966	Fordham	Fordham	82–72
47	March 2, 1967	Fordham	Manhattan	87–79
48	March 7, 1968	Fordham	Fordham	72–66
49	February 27, 1969	Fordham	Fordham	85–75
50	March 5, 1970	Fordham	Manhattan	73–54
51	March 11, 1971	Fordham	#10 Fordham	84–68
52	March 2, 1972	Fordham	Fordham	91–84
53	March 1, 1973	Manhattan	Manhattan	72–59
54	December 26, 1974	Fordham	Fordham	82–70
55	February 27, 1975	Fordham	Manhattan	81–75
56	February 26, 1976	Fordham	Manhattan	90–57
57	March 3, 1977	Fordham	Manhattan	82–49
58	February 22, 1978	Fordham	Manhattan	103–92
59	February 22, 1979	Fordham	Manhattan	64–52
60	December 22, 1979	Manhattan	Fordham	71–65
61	February 19, 1981	Fordham	Fordham	67–54
62	February 20, 1982	Fordham	Fordham	74–62
63	January 12, 1983	Fordham	Manhattan	55–53
64	February 24, 1983	Manhattan	Fordham	74–65
65	January 21, 1984	Fordham	Fordham	69–65
66	February 18, 1984	Manhattan	Fordham	82–62
67	January 19, 1985	Manhattan	Fordham	73–67
68	February 16, 1985	Fordham	Fordham	69–55
69	January 16, 1986	Manhattan	Fordham	87–58
70	February 4, 1986	Fordham	Fordham	93–57
71	January 15, 1987	Fordham	Manhattan	84–83
72	February 5, 1987	Manhattan	Fordham	96–79
73	January 13, 1988	Fordham	Fordham	60–59
74	February 15, 1988	Manhattan	Fordham	66–62
75	January 25, 1989	Manhattan	Fordham	82–76
76	February 22, 1989	Fordham	Fordham	58–41
77	January 20, 1990	Manhattan	Fordham	68–66
78	December 15, 1990	Fordham	Fordham	75–58

No.	Date	Location	Winner	Score
79	January 31, 1991	Manhattan	Fordham	75–68
80	January 4, 1992	Fordham	Manhattan	67–66
81	December 21, 1992	Manhattan	Manhattan	92–67
82	December 4, 1993	Fordham	Manhattan	57–51
83	December 4, 1994	Manhattan	Manhattan	88–48
84	December 16, 1995	Fordham	Manhattan	61–58
85	December 15, 1996	Manhattan	Manhattan	61–57
86	December 2, 1997	Fordham	Manhattan	62–55
87	December 27, 1998	Manhattan	Fordham	70–57
88	December 8, 1999	Fordham	Manhattan	69–68
89	December 5, 2000	Manhattan	Fordham	83–78
90	December 27, 2001	MSG	Manhattan	82–72
91	December 3, 2002	Fordham	Manhattan	85–57
92	November 29, 2003	Manhattan	Manhattan	90–77
93	November 27, 2004	Fordham	Manhattan	76–60
94	December 23, 2005	Manhattan	Manhattan	81–68
95	November 30, 2006	Fordham	Fordham	70–66
96	November 28, 2007	Manhattan	Fordham	66–57
97	November 22, 2008	Fordham	Manhattan	81–67
98	November 28, 2009	Manhattan	Manhattan	68–44
99	December 8, 2010	Fordham	Fordham	73–59
100	December 7, 2011	Manhattan	Manhattan	81–47
101	November 29, 2012	Fordham	Manhattan	65–58
102	November 26, 2013	Manhattan	Fordham	79–75
103	December 22, 2014	Barclays	Manhattan	71–57
104	November 28, 2015	Fordham	Fordham	87–64
105	December 10, 2016	Manhattan	Manhattan	60–53
106	November 26, 2017	Fordham	Fordham	70–57
107	December 1, 2018	Manhattan	Fordham	57–56
108	December 7, 2019	Fordham	Manhattan	54–53
109	December 3, 2020	cancelled		
110	November 12, 2021	Manhattan	Manhattan	66–60
111	November 27, 2023	Fordham	Fordham	93–61
112	November 15, 2024	Manhattan	Manhattan	78–76
113	December 13, 2025	Fordham	Fordham	82–53
114	November 17, 2026	Manhattan	Fordham	80–61
Series: Manhattan leads 58–55

=== Women's soccer ===
Fordham victories	Manhattan victories	Tie games

No.	Date	Location	Winner	Score
1	September 8, 1993	Gaelic Park	Manhattan	4–0
2	October 30, 1993	Coffey Field	Manhattan	3–1
3	October 28, 1994	Gaelic Park	Fordham	2–1
4	September 3, 1995	Coffey Field	Manhattan	2–1
5	August 31, 1996	Owen T. Carroll Field	Manhattan	2–1
6	September 6, 1997	Coffey Field	Fordham	2–0
7	September 8, 1998	Gaelic Park	Fordham	1–0
8	September 12, 1999	Coffey Field	Manhattan	2–1
9	September 10, 2000	Gaelic Park	Fordham	6–2
10	September 15, 2001 (Note: This match was cancelled due to the September 11 attacks.)	Coffey Field	None	–

No.	Date	Location	Winner	Score
11	September 21, 2002	Coffey Field	Fordham	2–0
12	September 20, 2003	Gaelic Park	Fordham	2–1
13	September 19, 2004	Coffey Field	Fordham	4–0
14	September 4, 2005	Gaelic Park	Manhattan	2–0
15	September 22, 2006	Coffey Field	Fordham	3–0
16	September 9, 2007	Gaelic Park	Tie	1–1
17	September 14, 2008	Coffey Field	Fordham	4–1
18	September 18, 2009	Gaelic Park	Fordham	3–0
19	August 29, 2010	Coffey Field	Fordham	2–1
20	September 9, 2011	Gaelic Park	Manhattan	1–0

No.	Date	Location	Winner	Score
21	August 24, 2012	Coffey Field	Fordham	1–0
22	August 23, 2013	Gaelic Park	Manhattan	2–1
23	August 24, 2014	Coffey Field	Fordham	2–1
24	August 28, 2015	Gaelic Park	Fordham	2–0
25	September 4, 2016	Coffey Field	Fordham	2–0
26	August 25, 2017	Gaelic Park	Fordham	1–0
27	September 9, 2018	Coffey Field	Fordham	2–0
28	August 29, 2019	Gaelic Park	Fordham	1–0
Series: Fordham leads 18–8–1

== See also ==
- Fordham–St. John's rivalry
