= Peter Bavasi =

American baseball executive (born 1942)

Peter Bavasi (born 1942 in Bronxville, New York) is an American former front-office executive in Major League Baseball.

The son of Emil J. "Buzzie" Bavasi, who spent almost 35 years in senior management positions in the Major Leagues, Peter Bavasi held high-profile jobs with three MLB organizations: the San Diego Padres, Toronto Blue Jays and Cleveland Indians. He was farm system director of the Padres (1969–72), then their general manager (1973–76), succeeding his father. He then became the first president and general manager in the history of the expansion Blue Jays (1977). Upon relinquishing his GM responsibilities to his top assistant, future Baseball Hall of Fame executive Pat Gillick, in 1978, Bavasi continued as the Blue Jays' president from 1978 to 1981. He then served as club president of the Indians for the seasons of 1985–86. His brother Bill, currently the director of the Major League Baseball Scouting Bureau, also served as an MLB general manager with the California / Anaheim Angels (1994–99) and Seattle Mariners (2004–08).

== Career ==
=== Los Angeles Dodgers ===
Bavasi began his baseball apprenticeship under his father and Walter O'Malley, the owner of the Dodgers from 1950 to 1979. Bavasi graduated from Saint Mary's College of California with a Bachelor of Arts degree in philosophy. His first job in baseball was as business manager of the Dodgers' Texas League farm team in Albuquerque. In 1966, he was general manager of the Santa Barbara Dodgers of the Class A California League. Then, in 1967–68, Bavasi returned to Albuquerque as the Dukes' general manager. While there, Bavasi would work with manager Roy Hartsfield; he later hired Hartsfield to manage in the Padres' organization and named him the first skipper in Blue Jay history.

=== San Diego Padres ===
In 1969, Bavasi was named director of minor league operations for the San Diego Padres expansion team, where his father, Buzzie, was president and de facto general manager. In 1973, Peter became the vice president/GM of the Padres. One of the future managers of the Toronto Blue Jays, Cito Gaston, played for the Padres under Bavasi's tenure.

=== Toronto Blue Jays ===
Bavasi competed with Frank Cashen, whose previous experience was with the Baltimore Orioles, for the position of general manager of the expansion Toronto Blue Jays. Although some of the club's board members preferred Bavasi because of his interest in the marketing aspect of baseball, the original choice was Cashen. After Cashen withdrew, Bavasi won the job. He was appointed on June 18, 1976.

Bavasi was considered the orchestrator of Blue Jay Mania. Bavasi's strategy from the beginning was to seek public involvement in Blue Jays development. A name the team contest was held in which Blue Jays was the winning selection. When it came to the development of a team logo, Bavasi sought a symbol as easily recognizable as former Padres owner Ray Kroc's McDonald's golden arches. The logo featured a Blue Jay, superimposed on a baseball with a red maple leaf stuck in its ear.

A key issue for Bavasi was hiring a manager. Rumours had spread that the Jays were interested in several candidates, including: Joe Altobelli, Billy DeMars, Preston Gómez, Elston Howard, and Warren Spahn. Bavasi, however, selected Hartsfield, who had enjoyed great success managing the Padres' Triple-A farm team, the Hawaii Islanders, leading them to consecutive Pacific Coast League titles in 1975–76.

The Blue Jays were one of the worst teams in the Majors in the first half of the 1981 season, as the Blue Jays had a record of 16 wins and 42 losses, a percentage of .276. Although the Blue Jays had future stars Jesse Barfield, George Bell, and Lloyd Moseby in the lineup, the team continued to struggle.

The result was one of the more controversial times in franchise history. Bavasi went to see the team in Anaheim against the California Angels. Bavasi's father, Buzzie Bavasi was the president of the Angels, and his team had gotten off to a lacklustre start. Buzzie wanted to fire Angels manager Jim Fregosi, and Peter Bavasi had the idea to fire his manager, Bobby Mattick. Both thought it would be big news if father and son fired their manager on the same night. One of the Blue Jays executives advised the Jays Vice-chairman of the Board, Peter Hardy. After a brief conversation, Hardy made it clear to Peter Bavasi that Mattick would not be fired in this way. On November 22, 1981, Hardy forced Bavasi to resign from the Blue Jays., with the resignation announced to the public on November 24, 1981.

=== Cleveland Indians ===
Bavasi had joined the Cleveland Indians as its president in November 1984, serving through January 1987. While Cleveland's president, he was a member of the Major League Baseball's executive council. During the 1986 season, the team had an 84–78 record, its best since 1968, and attendance of 1.47 million, its highest since 1959.

== Life after Major League Baseball ==
Bavasi resigned before the 1987 season began, to take over as president and chief executive officer of Telerate Sports.

He also directed the international sports practice at the public relations firm Hill & Knowlton, and was president of ESPN SportsTicker, a supplier of instant sports news and information. Bavasi has also been a strategic advisor to cities seeking Major League Baseball teams, including the successful franchise pursuits in St. Petersburg, Florida (which would result in the Tampa Bay Devil Rays), and most recently Washington, D.C. (which would lead to the Montreal Expos becoming the Washington Nationals. He and his brother Bill were co-managing partners of the Yuba-Sutter Gold Sox, a Marysville, California-based collegiate summer league baseball club.

Preceded by Eddie Leishman	San Diego Padres general manager 1973–1976	Succeeded by Bob Fontaine
Preceded by Franchise established	Toronto Blue Jays general manager 1977	Succeeded by Pat Gillick
Preceded by Franchise established	Toronto Blue Jays president 1977–1981	Succeeded by Peter Hardy (Chairman and CEO)
Preceded by Gabe Paul	Cleveland Indians president 1985–1987	Succeeded by Hank Peters
