= Anthony Colón =

Puerto Rican middle-distance runner

Antonio Colón
Personal information
- Nationality: Puerto Rican; American
- Born: February 24, 1952 (age 74) Unspecified, Puerto Rico

Sport
- Sport: Track
- Event(s): 5000 meters, 10,000 meters
- College team: Manhattan College
- Retired: now he is a Spanish 2 teacher at Lakeview Centennial High School in Garland, Texas.

Achievements and titles
- Personal best(s): 1500 meters: 3:40.20; Mile: 3:56.4; 3000 meters: 7:53.9; 5000 meters: 13:48.7; 10,000 meters: 28:35.60

Anthony Colón (born February 24, 1952) is a retired Puerto Rican middle-distance runner. He competed at the 1972 Summer Olympics and 1976 Summer Olympics in the 1500 metres.

== Running career ==
Colón attended high school at Power Memorial Academy, where he ran cross country and track. By the time he graduated from PMA, he recorded personal-bests of 4:06.0 in the mile and 1:52.8 in the 880 yards. At Manhattan College, he ran track for the Jaspers. Along with Michael Keogh, Colón won the team 1973 NCAA Men's Division I Indoor Track and Field Championships and was part of the distance medley relay championship team.
