= Toronto Blue Jays =

Major League Baseball franchise in Toronto, Canada

- 2026 Toronto Blue Jays season

Logo	Cap insignia
- Established in 1977

Major league affiliations
- American League (1977–present); East Division (1977–present)

Current uniform
- Retired numbers: 32; 42

Colours
- Royal blue, white, red, navy blue

Name
- Toronto Blue Jays (1977–present)

Nicknames
- The Jays

Ballpark
- Rogers Centre (1989–2019, 2021–present) (Note: Known as SkyDome from 1989 to 2005.); Sahlen Field (2020, June 2021–July 2021) (Note: As a result of the COVID-19 pandemic, the Blue Jays played 49 home games during the 2020 and 2021 season at Sahlen Field in Buffalo, New York, and 21 home games during the 2021 season at TD Ballpark in Dunedin, Florida.); TD Ballpark (April 2021–May 2021); Exhibition Stadium (1977–1989)

Major league titles
- World Series titles (2): 1992; 1993
- AL pennants (3): 1992; 1993; 2025
- AL East division titles (7): 1985; 1989; 1991; 1992; 1993; 2015; 2025
- Wild card berths (4): 2016; 2020; 2022; 2023

Front office
- Principal owner: Rogers Communications
- President: Mark Shapiro
- General manager: Ross Atkins
- Manager: John Schneider
- Website: mlb.com/bluejays

The Toronto Blue Jays (French: Blue Jays de Toronto) are a Canadian professional baseball team based in Toronto. The Blue Jays compete in Major League Baseball (MLB) as a member club of the American League (AL) East Division. Since 1989, the team has played its home games primarily at Rogers Centre in downtown Toronto.

The name "Blue Jays" originates from the blue jay bird, and blue is also the traditional colour of Toronto's collegiate and professional sports teams including the Maple Leafs (ice hockey) and the Argonauts (Canadian football). In 1976, out of the over 4,000 suggestions, 154 people selected the name "Blue Jays." In addition, the team was originally owned by the Labatt Brewing Company, makers of the popular beer Labatt Blue. Colloquially nicknamed the "Jays," the team's official colours are royal blue, white, red, and navy blue.

An expansion franchise, the club was founded in Toronto in 1977. Originally based at Exhibition Stadium, the team began playing its home games at SkyDome upon its opening in 1989. They are the second MLB franchise to be based outside the United States, and the only one remaining since the first Canadian franchise, the Montreal Expos, became the Washington Nationals in 2005. Since 2000, the Blue Jays have been owned by Rogers Communications and in 2004, SkyDome was purchased by that company, which renamed it Rogers Centre. The Blue Jays and the Atlanta Braves (Note: The Atlanta Braves are owned by Atlanta Braves Holdings, Inc.) are the only two MLB teams wholly under corporate ownership; the Blue Jays are the only American League team to be under such ownership.

Due to border restrictions brought about by the COVID-19 pandemic, the Blue Jays played home games at TD Ballpark in Dunedin, Florida, for April and May of the 2021 season, and Sahlen Field in Buffalo, New York, for the 2020 season as well as June and July 2021, returning home to Toronto on July 30 of that year.

In the late 1970s and early 1980s, the Blue Jays went through struggles typical of an expansion team, frequently finishing last in their division. In 1983, they had their first winning season and two years later, became division champions. From 1985 to 1993, the Blue Jays were an AL East powerhouse, winning five division championships in nine seasons, including three consecutive from 1991 to 1993. During that run, the team also became back-to-back World Series champions in 1992 and 1993, led by a core group of award-winning All-Star players, including Hall of Famer Roberto Alomar, Joe Carter, John Olerud, and Devon White. The Blue Jays became the first (and, to date, only) team based outside the U.S. to appear in and win a World Series and the fastest AL expansion team to do so, winning in their 16th year.

Following their championship seasons, the Blue Jays failed to qualify for the playoffs for 21 consecutive seasons until clinching a playoff berth and division championship in 2015. The team clinched a second consecutive playoff berth in 2016, after securing an AL wild card position. In both years, the Blue Jays beat the Texas Rangers in the AL Division Series, but lost the AL Championship Series. The Blue Jays qualified for the playoffs four times in six seasons, in 2020, 2022, 2023, and 2025. In 2025 they made it to the World Series for the third time, which they lost to the defending champion Los Angeles Dodgers.

From 1977 to 2026, the Blue Jays' overall win-loss record is 3,934–3,939–3 (.500).

== History ==
The Toronto Blue Jays came into existence in 1976 as one of two teams slated to join the American League for the following season via the 1977 Major League Baseball expansion. Toronto had been mentioned as a potential major league city as early as the 1880s and been home to the Toronto Maple Leafs baseball team of the International League from 1896 to 1967. In January 1976, the San Francisco Giants nearly relocated to Toronto after owner Horace Stoneham agreed to sell the team to a Canadian consortium. The group, which included Labatt Breweries of Canada, The Globe and Mail's Howard Webster, and the Canadian Imperial Bank of Commerce (CIBC), planned to rebrand the team as the Toronto Giants and play at Exhibition Stadium. However, a court ruling halted the move, and the Giants remained in San Francisco. Despite this setback, Toronto's ambition for an MLB team persisted, leading to their successful bid in the 1976 American League expansion, driven by a need to balance the league after Seattle was granted a team as a result of a lawsuit over their loss of the Pilots.

The new Toronto franchise, purchased for $7 million, was named the Toronto Blue Jays following a contest that attracted over 4,000 suggestions. The name reflected Toronto's tradition of using blue in team colours and was influenced by majority owner Labatt Breweries' flagship beer, Labatt Blue. The franchise's first employee, Paul Beeston, began as vice president of business operations, and before the inaugural 1977 season, Peter Bavasi and Pat Gillick were appointed as president and assistant general manager, respectively. The Blue Jays debuted on April 7, 1977, with a win against the Chicago White Sox amid a snowstorm, marking the beginning of a journey from early struggles to eventual success. Throughout the late 1970s and early 1980s, the Blue Jays showed gradual improvement, highlighted by their first winning season in 1983. The team's fortunes rose significantly under manager Bobby Cox in 1985 when they won their first American League East title. The late 1980s and early 1990s, under manager Cito Gaston, were particularly successful, with the Blue Jays winning multiple division titles and back-to-back World Series championships in 1992 and 1993, making them the first team outside the US to achieve this feat. Key players during this golden era included Roberto Alomar, Joe Carter, and Dave Stieb.

After the mid-1990s strike and subsequent downturn, the Blue Jays faced challenges but also saw the rise of talents like Roy Halladay and Carlos Delgado. The late 1990s brought brief revitalization with the acquisition of Roger Clemens. In the early 2000s, general manager J. P. Ricciardi led a rebuilding phase, culminating in a competitive roster by the mid-2000s. The team's resurgence in the 2010s featured playoff appearances in 2015 and 2016, driven by stars like José Bautista and Josh Donaldson. The Blue Jays continue to build for future success, with young talents like Vladimir Guerrero Jr., Bo Bichette, and Cavan Biggio leading the charge, though Biggio was later traded in 2024, and Bichette would leave through free agency.

=== 2024 season ===
During the off-season, the Blue Jays re-signed Kiermaier and signed utility player Isiah Kiner-Falefa, designated hitter Justin Turner, and pitcher Yariel Rodríguez. The Blue Jays also traded Santiago Espinal for a pitching prospect.

During the regular season, the Blue Jays designated Cavan Biggio for assignment and traded him for a prospect afterwards. Before the 2024 trade deadline, the Blue Jays traded away Yimi García, Nate Pearson, Danny Jansen, Justin Turner, Yusei Kikuchi, Trevor Richards, Isiah Kiner-Falefa, and Kevin Kiermaier.

=== 2025 season ===
The Toronto Blue Jays signed Anthony Santander and Max Scherzer in the off-season. The Blue Jays extended the contract of Vladimir Guerrero Jr. for $500 million over 14 seasons, making him among the highest paid athletes in the world.

Before the 2025 trade deadline, the Blue Jays traded for Seranthony Domínguez, Shane Bieber, Louis Varland, and Ty France.

The Blue Jays reached the World Series, losing to the Los Angeles Dodgers in seven games with Game 7 going into extra innings.

=== 2026 season ===
The Toronto Blue Jays signed Dylan Cease, Cody Ponce, and Kazuma Okamoto and re-signed Shane Bieber and Max Scherzer during the off-season. Early in the regular season, amid injuries to the starting rotation, the Blue Jays signed Patrick Corbin.

Before the 2025 trade deadline, the Blue Jays traded away Kevin Gausman, Daulton Varsho, and Jeff Hoffman and the Blue Jays acquired Brett Bateman and José Soriano.

== Popularity ==
Valuation of the Blue Jays 1991–present (in US dollars)
- Financial World
- Forbes
- Bloomberg News (Note: Unlike the Forbes valuations, Bloomberg includes contributions from regional sports networks and related businesses in the total valuation.)

In 1977, after just 50 home games, the Blue Jays set an MLB record for a first-year expansion team, with an overall attendance of 1,219,551 during those games. By the end of the season, 1,701,152 fans had attended. After setting an attendance record in 1990, with 3,885,284 fans, in 1991, the Blue Jays became the first MLB team to attract over four million fans, with an attendance of 4,001,526, followed by 4,028,318 in 1992. Each of those records were broken in 1993 by the expansion Colorado Rockies, although the Blue Jays' 1993 attendance of 4,057,947 stood as an AL record for 12 years until it was broken by the 2005 New York Yankees.

Several Blue Jays became very popular in Toronto and throughout the major leagues, starting with Dave Stieb, whose seven All-Star selections is a franchise record. He is closely followed by Roy Halladay and José Bautista, who were selected six times each, and by Roberto Alomar and Joe Carter, who were selected five times each. Bautista set a major league record in 2011 (which only stood for a year), with 7,454,753 All-Star votes. In his first season with the Blue Jays in 2015, Josh Donaldson set a new major league record by receiving 14,090,188 All-Star votes.

The team is popular throughout Canada, as the only MLB team based in the country following the relocation of the Montreal Expos to Washington. The team has played a number of exhibition games at BC Place in Vancouver including three-game series against the Milwaukee Brewers prior to both the 1984 and 1985 seasons (the Vancouver Canadians were the AAA farm team of the Brewers at the time), as well as single games against the Detroit Tigers and Brewers in 1993 and against the Montreal Expos and Seattle Mariners in 1994 in a series billed as the "Baseball Classic". The Jays also played the Cleveland Indians in an exhibition game at War Memorial Stadium in nearby Buffalo, New York in 1987. More recently, the club has hosted a pair of exhibition games at Olympic Stadium in Montreal prior to the start of the season against the New York Mets (2014), Cincinnati Reds (2015), Boston Red Sox (2016), Pittsburgh Pirates (2017), St. Louis Cardinals (2018), Milwaukee Brewers (2019). A series against the New York Yankees was scheduled for 2020, but was cancelled due to the COVID-19 pandemic. The club also has discussed playing more games at BC Place with the president of the Vancouver Canadians.

== Culture ==
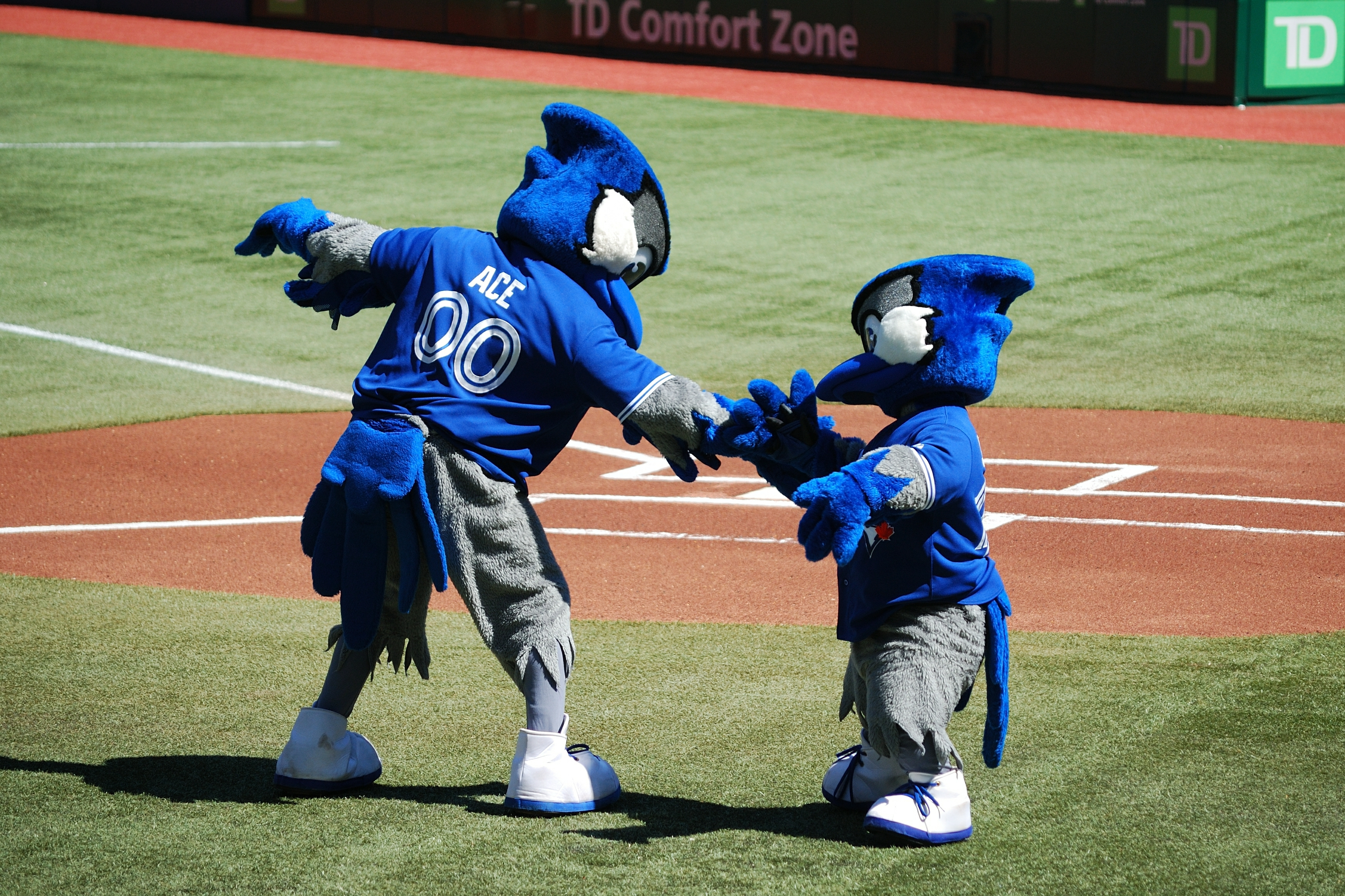
Ace and Junior exchange greetings before the game. Ace was the Blue Jays' second mascot, introduced in 2000. Junior is a mascot occasionally seen for Junior Jays day promotions.

=== "OK Blue Jays" ===
During the seventh-inning stretch of home games, before singing "Take Me Out to the Ball Game," Blue Jay fans sing and clap to the pop song "OK Blue Jays" by Keith Hampshire and The Bat Boys, which was released in 1983. The song was remixed in 2003, and since then, the new, shortened version has been played at home games as a fight song.

=== "Let's Go Blue Jays" ===
At home games, the "Let's Go Blue Jays" chant is played four times followed by "Charge" being played three times.

=== Mascots ===
From 1979 to 1999, BJ Birdy served as the Blue Jays' sole mascot, played by Kevin Shanahan. In 2000, he was replaced by a duo named Ace and Diamond. After the 2003 season, Diamond was removed by the team, leaving Ace as the team's sole mascot. Since the 2010s, Ace has been accompanied by his younger brother, Junior. This usually happens on the Jr. Jay Saturday promotions until the end of the 2017 season. The promotions were moved to select Sundays since the 2018 season since the Blue Jays can no longer hold early Saturday afternoon games to accommodate American national broadcasts on Fox, though Fox did occasionally broadcast Blue Jays games at the Rogers Centre.

=== Sunday Salute ===
Since 2012, every Sunday home game, the Blue Jays pay tribute to a member of the Canadian Armed Forces. During the third inning, the team presents the honoured member with a personalized jersey.

=== National anthems ===
Since 2005, "The Star-Spangled Banner" has been sung before "O Canada" at every home game as all of the Blue Jays' opponents are based in the United States. In some home games (including Canada Day home games), "O Canada" is sung in English and French to reflect Canada's bilingual and multicultural heritage and to represent the diverse population of the country. When "O Canada" was sung during the Home Opener, Canada Day, playoff games, and World Series, a giant Canadian flag was presented by members of the Canadian Armed Forces. Due to time constraints and broadcast scheduling, Sportsnet only airs the national anthems during the home opener, Canada Day, playoff games, and World Series because a commercial break occurs during the anthems. On June 29, 2019, "O Canada" was sung in Cree and English. On September 30, 2021, the National Day for Truth and Reconciliation, "O Canada" was sung in English, French, and Anishinaabemowin. On the following National Day for Truth and Reconciliation, September 30, 2022, "O Canada" was sung in French, English, and Blackfoot. For Blue Jays road games, "O Canada" is sung before the "Star-Spangled Banner" as all road games (since the Expos moved to Washington, DC) for the Blue Jays are in the United States.

=== Canada Day ===
The Blue Jays traditionally host an afternoon home game during Canada Day. During the game, the team wears red jerseys instead of blue jerseys. During the pre-game ceremony, a giant Canadian flag is presented by members of the Canadian Armed Forces while "O Canada" is sung in English and French by a member of the Royal Canadian Air Force Band or military personnel. The game was cancelled in 2020 due to the COVID-19 pandemic. In 2021, the game was held in Buffalo, New York due to Canada–U.S. travel restrictions.

=== Fan Appreciation Weekend ===
Fan Appreciation Weekend traditionally falls on the last weekend of September marking the team's final home games.

== Uniforms ==
=== 1977–1988: Pullovers and powder blue ===
The Blue Jays wore pullover uniforms during their first decade of existence. The front of the home white uniforms contained the team name in a unique blue/white/blue split-letter style, with the team logo centred below. The road uniforms were powder blue, with the city name in front and the team logo centred below. Initially, the city name was rendered in bold blue letters before gaining a white outline the following season. By 1979, it was replaced by the team name in a split-lettered white/blue/white style. Player numerals also used the split-letter style, except on the road uniform during its first two seasons. Player names in blue were added to both uniforms for the 1980 season but were dropped from the road uniform in 1981. The caps were blue with the Blue Jays logo on a white panel in front.

In 2008, the Blue Jays' powder blue road uniform from this era was restored as an alternate home uniform worn every Friday until 2010.

=== 1989–1996: Championship blues ===
The Blue Jays adopted buttoned uniforms upon moving to Rogers Centre (then SkyDome) in 1989. Aside from the additions of buttons and belts, the only change affecting the home uniforms was the relocation of the team logo to the left chest. The road uniforms changed from powder blue to grey, while the city name and numerals in blue/white/blue split letters were emblazoned, and the logo moved to the left chest. Player names were also added to the road uniform. All-blue caps were worn with their road uniform while keeping the white-panelled blue caps at home. By 1993, the all-blue caps were worn universally, supplanting and eventually retiring the original cap design. The full-time switch to all-blue caps came out of superstition. After the Blue Jays lost five consecutive games of a road trip midway through the 1993 season, they decided to abandon the white-panelled caps for home games in favour of the road all-blue caps, and promptly won their first home game back, en route to winning their second consecutive World Series championship.

In 1994 the Blue Jays began wearing blue alternate uniforms with the team name and numerals in white/blue/white split letters.

=== 1997–2003: Red, teal and blue ===
The Blue Jays updated their logo prior to the 1997 season with a new bird design and an enlarged red maple leaf at the back. The usage of red was greatly increased on the team's new uniforms. On the home uniforms, the letters and numerals were changed to blue/teal/blue split letters, while road uniform letters and numerals were changed to blue/red/blue split letters. On the alternate blue uniforms, split letters and numerals became red/blue/red. Red also appeared on the pant and sleeve stripes, while the new logo occupied the left sleeve. Player names also took on the new block split-letter style. An updated all-blue cap was paired with the home and road uniforms, while a red-brimmed blue cap (with a modified logo without a baseball) was used with the blue alternates.

In 1999 the Blue Jays unveiled an alternate sleeveless white uniform, featuring the same lettering style as the regular home uniform. However, the chest numerals were replaced with the primary logo. Blue undershirts were worn with this uniform.

Before the 2001 season, slight modifications were made to the uniforms, eliminating the tricolour stripes and adding a single colour piping along the chest and neck. While the home uniforms remained mostly intact, the road uniforms gained blue sleeves in a faux-vest design. On the alternate white uniform (now a faux vest instead of a straight sleeveless design), the new "T-bird" logo replaced the primary "jay leaf" logo, which moved to the left sleeve. In 2003, the "T-bird" logo became the primary, taking over the previous logo's placement on the caps and sleeves, while the alternate white uniforms brought back chest numerals. The "T-bird" logo depicts a blue jay flexing its biceps and is nicknamed "Muscle Jay."

=== 2004–2011: The "Black-and-Graphite Jays" ===
Before the 2004 season, the Blue Jays adopted a new visual identity, going with a black, silver and graphite motif. The home and black alternates simply read "Jays" in front and in a 3D-oriented diagonal arrangement, with the bird connected to the letter "J." Letters and numerals were in graphite with light blue and silver trim. The road uniforms featured the city name in a similar letter style as the logo, with graphite letters and numerals trimmed in light blue and silver. In 2008, however, amid complaints of illegibility, the Blue Jays tweaked their road uniforms to include 3D-style block letters and numerals in light blue trimmed in black and white, along with chest numerals. The "J-bird" alternate was added to the left sleeve. A red maple leaf would be added on the right sleeve starting in 2009. The Blue Jays wore all-black caps with the "J-bird" logo for much of the uniforms' existence, save for the 2004 and 2005 seasons when they wore all-graphite caps at home, and in 2007 when an alternate all-black cap with the "T" from the previous road uniform was used.

=== 2012–present: Return to traditional look ===
Prior to the 2012 season, the Blue Jays unveiled new uniforms and a new logo. The logo is a modernized version of the original logo used from 1977 to 1996. The bird's head was also made sleeker than its 1977–1996 predecessor. The uniforms are similar to the ones used from 1989 to 1996, the team's most successful era. New serifed split letters were also released. In 2015, the Blue Jays began wearing a modernized version of the white-panelled blue caps they originally wore from 1977 to 1993 as an alternate. Initially, the modern white-panelled caps were worn occasionally from 2015 to 2022, but after a two-year hiatus, it was brought back for three of the Blue Jays' final four home games in 2025. The return of the white-panelled caps was suggested by Blue Jays pitcher Jeff Hoffman after the team lost six of seven games amid a heated division race with the New York Yankees. Consequently, the Blue Jays finished the season winning the final four games, earning the division title.

Before the 2020 season, the Blue Jays unveiled a modernized version of the powder blue uniforms, featuring navy/white/navy serifed split letters and numerals. These uniforms are paired with a powder-brimmed navy cap and an all-navy helmet.

=== Canada Day uniforms ===
Since 1996, the Blue Jays wore predominantly red or red-accented uniforms every July 1, Canada Day. The uniforms were based on the team's alternate uniforms they wore at the time but with red as the primary colour. On a few occasions, the Blue Jays added red trim to an existing white uniform (or, in the case of the 2006 uniforms, their black alternates) and sometimes added the flag of Canada or a red maple leaf on the uniform.

=== City Connect uniform ===
In 2024, the Blue Jays unveiled a City Connect uniform inspired by Toronto's nightlife. The jersey is nicknamed "Night Mode" and is a "pitch blue" (dark blue) uniform that features an illustration of the Toronto skyline in royal blue, centred by the "Toronto" wordmark in red. The "pitch blue" colour is a reference to Lake Ontario's reflection at night. The traditional Blue Jays logo patch on the sleeve is recoloured to match the uniform. The cap is also "pitch blue" and features a red maple leaf at the centre of a stylized red and blue "T" in split letters.

== Rivalries ==
=== Detroit Tigers ===
The Detroit Tigers are the Blue Jays' geographic and traditional rival, dating back to the 1980s, when the teams were AL East contenders. The Tigers moved to the AL Central in 1998, and the rivalry has died down as a result, with the teams facing each other only six to seven times per year since 2011. Depending on traffic and border delays, Detroit is about a four-hour drive from Toronto via Highway 401. According to The Detroit News, a July 2017 three-game series at Comerica Park against the Blue Jays drew a season-best-to-date total attendance of 115,088.

=== Seattle Mariners ===
Although the Seattle Mariners are not a divisional rival, many Blue Jays fans from Western Canada travel to Seattle when the Blue Jays play there as Seattle is geographically closer to Western Canada than Toronto is. Depending on traffic and border delays, Seattle is about a three-hour drive from Vancouver. The Seattle Times estimated that Blue Jays fans represented around 70 percent of the crowd in Safeco Field for a June 2017 weekend series. Additionally, both teams joined the league at the same time in the 1977 Major League Baseball expansion. The teams met in the 2025 American League Championship Series (ALCS), with the Blue Jays defeating the Mariners in seven games.

=== Montreal Expos (historic) ===
The Montreal Expos were the Blue Jays' geographic National League rival, being the other Canadian MLB team before it was relocated. From 1978 to 1986, the teams played an annual mid-season exhibition game known as the Pearson Cup, named after former Prime Minister Lester B. Pearson. The teams began facing each other in the regular season in 1997 with the advent of interleague play. During the 2003 and 2004 seasons, the Expos' last two seasons before relocating to Washington, D.C., as the Nationals, the Pearson Cup was awarded after a pair of three-game sets.

== Broadcasting ==
Canadian regions subject to MLB blackout Toronto Blue Jays exclusively Shared with Seattle Mariners Shared with Minnesota Twins Shared with Boston Red Sox Note: Toronto Blue Jays territory covers all of Canada

=== Radio ===
The Blue Jays' former radio play-by-play announcer, Tom Cheek, called every Toronto Blue Jays game from the team's inaugural contest on April 7, 1977, until June 3, 2004, when he took two games off following the death of his father—a streak of 4,306 consecutive regular-season games and 41 postseason games. Cheek later died on October 9, 2005, and the team commemorated him during their 2006 season by wearing a circular patch on the left sleeve of their home and road game jerseys. The patch was adorned with the letters 'TC', Cheek's initials, as well as a stylized microphone. Cheek is also honoured with a place in the Blue Jays' "Level of Excellence" in the upper level of the Rogers Centre; the number 4,306 is depicted beside his name. In 2008, Cheek received the third most votes from fans to be nominated for the Ford C. Frick Award for broadcasting excellence. Cheek finally received the Frick Award posthumously in 2013 after nine years on the ballot.

Radio broadcasts of Blue Jays games originate from Sportsnet 590 CJCL in Toronto, which, like the Blue Jays, is owned by Rogers Communications. After Cheek's retirement in 2005, Jerry Howarth, who had been Cheek's broadcasting partner since 1982, took over as lead play-by-play announcer, with Mike Wilner as the secondary play-by-play announcer. During the 2007 to 2012 seasons, former Blue Jays catcher Alan Ashby was the colour commentator. Former Blue Jays pitcher Jack Morris served as the colour commentator during the 2013 season, after which he was replaced by former Montreal Expos catcher Joe Siddall since the 2014 season.

Former Blue Jays pitcher Dirk Hayhurst filled in for Morris for some games during the 2013 season.

Another former catcher for the Blue Jays, Gregg Zaun, has served as the occasional colour commentator from the 2011 season until the end of the 2017 season when he was terminated amid accusations of improper conduct from several female employees.

Following Howarth's retirement in the 2017 season, Ben Wagner was hired as the primary radio play-by-play announcer, splitting said duties with Dan Shulman and Mike Wilner. After Dan moved exclusively to television in 2023, his son Ben Shulman was eventually brought in to do select games before becoming the primary radio announcer as of 2024. Ben is paired with Chris Leroux on the Blue Jays radio broadcasts.

In November 2020, Mike Wilner was laid off by the team. In February 2021, it was announced that "in an effort to minimize travel and closely adhere to team, league, and government protocols related to the pandemic", all radio broadcasts for the 2021 season will be a simulcast of the television broadcast. Wagner will assume an alternative role. However, once the Blue Jays returned to Rogers Centre in late July 2021, dedicated radio broadcasts resumed.

The Blue Jays have the largest geographical home market in all of baseball, encompassing all of Canada. Despite this, the number of radio stations that broadcast games is actually quite small. Only 18 radio stations across the country aired at least some Blue Jays games during the 2021 season, which is fewer affiliates than most MLB teams, which have more stations covering smaller geographic areas.

=== Television ===
All Blue Jays games are carried nationally on Sportsnet (which, like the Blue Jays, is owned by Rogers Communications). As of 2026, Dan Shulman serves as the lead play-by-play announcer, with Joe Siddall as the primary colour commentator; on select series, Caleb Joseph and Madison Shipman serve as alternate colour commentators. From 1987 to 2000 and from 2010 to 2025, Buck Martinez had been part of the broadcast team, both as a primary play-by-play announcer and colour commentator. During his tenure as a play-by-play announcer, Martinez was paired alongside colour commentator Pat Tabler, with Shulman only calling games sporadically from 2016 until 2022 due to his ESPN assignments in the United States. In previous years, the colour analyst role rotated between Pat Tabler, Rance Mulliniks, Darrin Fletcher, and from 2011 to 2017, Gregg Zaun. Sportsnet became the team's primary carrier soon after it launched in the late 1990s and became the team's exclusive broadcaster in 2010. As of August 2010, Sportsnet One also broadcasts Blue Jays games (often in case of scheduling conflicts with the main Sportsnet channels). Rogers was, however, criticized by fans and critics due to Sportsnet One only being carried by Rogers Cable systems on launch.

Sportsnet's broadcasts of the 2015 American League Division Series involving the Blue Jays were among the highest-rated telecasts in network history, with Game 4 drawing an audience of 4.38 million viewers.

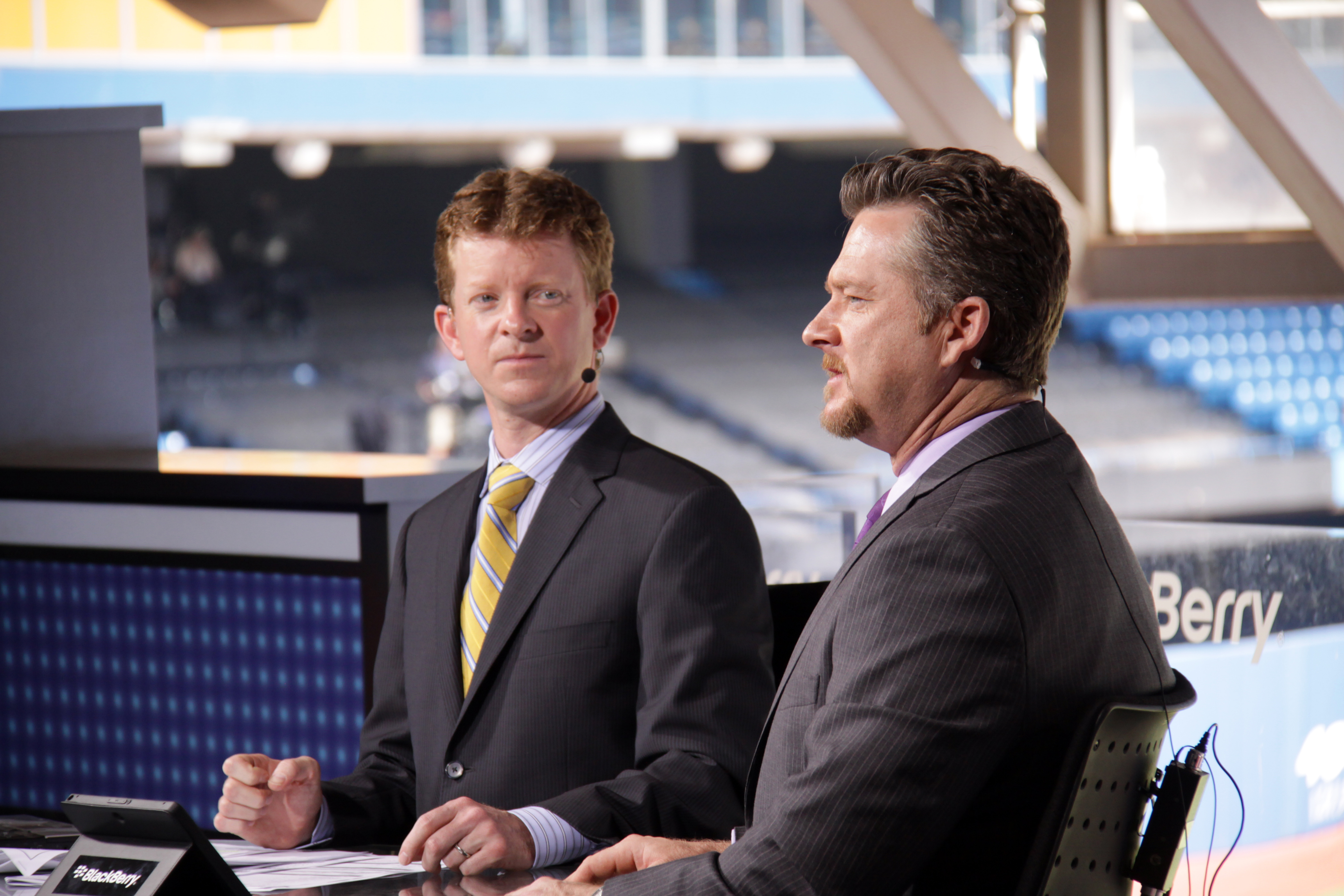
Jamie Campbell and Gregg Zaun providing Sportsnet coverage of a Toronto Blue Jays game in 2011

In September 2012, AMI-tv simulcast three Blue Jays games with described video provided by CJCL correspondent Sam Cosentino, which included explanations of on-screen graphics. Paul Beeston praised AMI's involvement, stating that "to our knowledge, we are the first sports organization to have our games provided through this revolutionary approach to accommodating the needs of the blind and low-vision community."

On June 27, 2013, Rogers' over-the-air Toronto multicultural Omni Television station CJMT-DT simulcast a Blue Jays game, scheduled to be started by Taiwanese player Chien-Ming Wang, with commentary in Mandarin, marking the first ever Canadian MLB broadcast in the language. In June 2018, Omni announced that it would air Sunday afternoon games in Tagalog, the most spoken language of the Philippines, through the remainder of the season. Sportsnet and Omni announced a regular season of Sunday broadcasts in Tagalog for the 2019 season.

TVA Sports has aired games in French since 2011, with Denis Casavant and François Paquet on play-by-play and Rodger Brulotte on colour. The channel currently has rights to 81 Blue Jay games per season in a three-year deal signed in 2023. Jacques Doucet, former Montreal Expos radio announcer, broadcast the Blue Jays on TVA Sports from 2011 until his retirement in 2022.

The Sports Network (TSN), which (like the Jays) was owned by Labatt from 1984 to 1995, served as the primary cable television outlet for the Blue Jays prior to the launch of Sportsnet. TSN (and later, its sister channel TSN2) continued to carry approximately ten Jays games through the 2009 season until May 2010; most recently, Rod Black handled play-by-play while Tabler served as colour commentator on these telecasts. CBC has carried Blue Jays games intermittently throughout the team's history, most recently in 2007 and 2008; those broadcasts featured Jim Hughson as the play-by-play announcer, and former Blue Jays Rance Mulliniks and Jesse Barfield on colour commentary. Games also aired on CTV (except in Montreal) from the team's inception until the late 1990s; the channel also served as the primary outlet of Blue Jays postseason games simulcast from the United States, at the time when the Blue Jays were not permitted to produce their own postseason broadcasts.

In 2008, Rogers Communications, owner of the Jays, was granted a license by the Canadian Radio-Television Commission (CRTC) for a "Baseball TV" specialty channel. The channel would have been dedicated to coverage of baseball, combining content from the United States–based MLB Network with original Canadian content. However, the channel was never launched, and Rogers sponsored an application to allow distribution of the U.S. MLB Network on Canadian providers instead.

Until 2022, Sportsnet was not permitted to use its domestic production for Blue Jays games if the team is in postseason play (as it was technically still considered a regional broadcaster) and instead carries the U.S. broadcast (such as Fox in 2015, and TBS in 2016). Buck Martinez has served as a colour commentator for post-season coverage ultimately simulcast by Sportsnet, however, having formerly worked Division Series games for TBS and on the MLB International broadcast of the 2016 World Series. Beginning in 2022, MLB allowed Sportsnet to carry its own production of Blue Jays postseason games as the network's classification was changed from a regional to a national broadcaster. During the Blue Jays' 2025 World Series run, Sportsnet's sister over-the-air channel Citytv carried Fox's broadcast for simultaneous substitution purposes.

== Roster ==
Toronto Blue Jays 2027 spring training roster
40-man roster		Non-roster invitees	Coaches / other
Pitchers: 45 Spencer Arrighetti; 17 José Berríos; 28 Jake Bloss; 84 Dylan Cease; 70 Brendan Cellucci; 37 Chad Dallas; 63 Braydon Fisher; 68 Mason Fluharty; 44 Bowden Francis; -- Daniel Guerra; 65 John Klein; 54 Brendon Little; 62 Spencer Miles; -- Nolan Perry; 66 Cody Ponce; 64 José Rodríguez; 71 Tyler Rogers; 40 José Soriano; 33 Ricky Tiedemann; 77 Louis Varland; 39 Trey Yesavage	Catchers: 30 Alejandro Kirk; -- Shawn Ross; 59 Brandon Valenzuela; Infielders: -- Christian Cairo; 22 Ernie Clement; 0 Andrés Giménez; 27 Vladimir Guerrero Jr.; 26 Charles McAdoo; 7 Kazuma Okamoto; 9 Josh Smith; Outfielders: 47 Addison Barger; 21 Brett Bateman; 8 Jonatan Clase; 38 Nathan Lukes; 24 Yohendrick Piñango; 25 Anthony Santander; -- RJ Schreck; Designated hitters: 20 Sean Keys	Pitchers: -- Lazaro Estrada; -- Josh Stephan; Outfielders: -- Victor Arias; -- Rudy Martin Jr.	Manager: 14 John Schneider; Coaches: 61 Alex Andreopoulos (bullpen catcher); 81 Cody Atkinson (assistant hitting); 53 Mark Budzinski (first base/outfield); 51 Carlos Febles (third base/infield); 88 Sam Greene (assistant pitching); 15 DeMarlo Hale (associate manager); 78 Luis Hurtado (bullpen catcher); 80 Lou Iannotti (assistant hitting); 82 Graham Johnson (bullpen); -- John Lannan (mental performance coach); 79 David Popkins (hitting); 41 Pete Walker (pitching); Vacant (bench); 39 active, 0 inactive, 4 non-roster invitees; 7-, 10-, or 15-day injured list; * Not on active roster; ^{†} Suspended list; Roster, coaches, and NRIs updated November 20, 2026; Transactions • Depth chart; → All MLB rosters

== Minor league affiliations ==
The Toronto Blue Jays farm system consists of seven minor league affiliates.

Class	Team	League	Location	Ballpark	Affiliated
Triple-A	Buffalo Bisons	International League	Buffalo, New York	Sahlen Field	2013
Double-A	New Hampshire Fisher Cats	Eastern League	Manchester, New Hampshire	Delta Dental Stadium	2003
High-A	Vancouver Canadians	Northwest League	Vancouver, British Columbia	Nat Bailey Stadium	2011
Single-A	Dunedin Blue Jays	Florida State League	Dunedin, Florida	TD Ballpark	1987
Rookie	FCL Blue Jays	Florida Complex League	Dunedin, Florida	Englebert Complex	2007
Rookie	DSL Blue Jays Red	Dominican Summer League	Boca Chica, Santo Domingo	Baseball City Complex	2025
Rookie	DSL Blue Jays Blue	Dominican Summer League	Boca Chica, Santo Domingo	Baseball City Complex	2025

== Awards and other achievements ==
=== Franchise records ===
Statistic	Single season record			Career record	
Statistic	Player	Record	Season	Player	Record
Games played:	Tony Fernández	163	1986	Tony Fernández	1,450
Plate appearances:	Vernon Wells	735	2003	Carlos Delgado	6,018
At bats:	Tony Fernández	687	1986	Vernon Wells	5,470
Batting average:	John Olerud	.363	1993	Roberto Alomar	.307
On-base percentage:	John Olerud	.473	1993	John Olerud	.395
Slugging percentage:	Carlos Delgado	.664	2000	Carlos Delgado	.556
On-base plus slugging:	Carlos Delgado	1.134	2000	Carlos Delgado	.949
Runs scored:	Shawn Green	134	1999	Carlos Delgado	889
Hits:	Vernon Wells	215	2003	Tony Fernández	1,583
Total bases:	Carlos Delgado	378	2000	Carlos Delgado	2,786
Doubles:	Carlos Delgado	57	2000	Carlos Delgado	343
Triples:	Tony Fernández	17	1990	Tony Fernández	72
Home runs:	José Bautista	54	2010	Carlos Delgado	336
RBI	Carlos Delgado	145	2003	Carlos Delgado	1,058
Walks:	José Bautista	132	2011	Carlos Delgado	827
Stolen bases:	Dave Collins	60	1984	Lloyd Moseby	255
Games played (pitcher):	Mark Eichhorn	89	1987	Jason Frasor	505
Games started:	Jim Clancy	40	1982	Dave Stieb	408
Wins:	Roy Halladay	22	2003	Dave Stieb	175
Losses:	Jerry Garvin; Phil Huffman	18	1977; 1979	Jim Clancy	140
Winning percentage:	Dennis Lamp	1.000	1985	Roger Clemens	.759
Innings pitched:	Dave Stieb	288.1	1982	Dave Stieb	2,873
ERA:	Mark Eichhorn	1.72	1986	Tom Henke	2.48
Earned runs:	Erik Hanson	129	1996	Dave Stieb	1,091
Strikeouts:	Roger Clemens	292	1997	Dave Stieb	1,658
Complete Games:	Dave Stieb	19	1982	Dave Stieb	102
Shutouts:	Dave Stieb	5	1982	Dave Stieb	30
Saves:	Duane Ward	45	1993	Tom Henke	217

=== No-hitters ===
Only one Blue Jays pitcher has thrown a no-hitter in franchise history. It was accomplished by Dave Stieb on September 2, 1990, against the Cleveland Indians, after losing three no-hit bids with two outs in the ninth inning.

No perfect games, a special subcategory of no-hitter, has been thrown in Blue Jays history. The franchise came closest on August 4, 1989, when Stieb gave up a double to Yankees' batter Roberto Kelly with two outs in the ninth, who then scored by the next batter.

#	Date	Pitcher	Final score	Base- runners	Opponent	Catcher	Plate umpire	Manager	Notes	Ref
1	September 2, 1990	Dave Stieb	3–0	4	Cleveland Indians	Pat Borders	Drew Coble	Cito Gaston	First and only no-hitter in franchise history; First and only no-hitter on the road; First and only right-handed pitcher to throw a no-hitter in franchise history	

=== Triple Crown champions ===
Roger Clemens won the pitching Triple Crown in 1997 and 1998.

=== Baseball Hall of Famers ===
Eleven former Blue Jays, one former manager, and one former general manager have been elected into the Baseball Hall of Fame. Second baseman Roberto Alomar, elected to the Hall of Fame in 2011, is the first player to be inducted based primarily on service as a player for the Blue Jays.

Toronto Blue Jays Hall of Famers
Affiliation according to the National Baseball Hall of Fame and Museum
Toronto Blue Jays

**Roberto Alomar**
Bobby Cox
Pat Gillick^{†}

Roy Halladay^{‡}
Rickey Henderson
Jeff Kent

Fred McGriff
Paul Molitor
Jack Morris

Phil Niekro
Dave Parker
Scott Rolen

Frank Thomas
Dave Winfield

- Players and managers listed in **bold** are depicted on their Hall of Fame plaques wearing a Blue Jays cap insignia.
- ^{†} – Pat Gillick was elected as an Executive/Pioneer; accordingly, he is not depicted on his plaque wearing a cap. The Hall of Fame recognizes the Blue Jays as his primary team.
- ^{‡} – Roy Halladay's plaque does not depict him with a cap insignia; however, the Hall of Fame recognizes the Blue Jays as his primary team.

Bobby Doerr, a second baseman with the Boston Red Sox, served as a hitting coach with the Blue Jays early in their history, 1977–1981, and was the first person associated with the franchise to be elected to the Baseball Hall of Fame, in 1986.

Early Wynn, the Baseball Hall of Fame pitcher (1972) and career 300-game winner, was a radio broadcaster for the Blue Jays with Tom Cheek during their first few years, 1977–1981.

=== Ford C. Frick Award recipients ===
Toronto Blue Jays Ford C. Frick Award recipients
Affiliation according to the National Baseball Hall of Fame and Museum

**Tom Cheek**

Tony Kubek

- **Names in bold** received the award based primarily on their work as broadcasters for the Blue Jays.

=== BBWAA Career Excellence Award recipients ===
- **Bob Elliott**

Names in bold received the award based primarily on their work covering the Blue Jays.

=== Canadian Baseball Hall of Fame ===
Blue Jays in the Canadian Baseball Hall of Fame
No.	Inductee	Position	Tenure	Notes
12	Roberto Alomar	2B	1991–1995	
—	Gord Ash	GM	1995–2001	Born in Toronto, attended York University
—	Paul Beeston	Executive	1976–1997; 2008–2015	Born in Welland, Ontario, attended University of Western Ontario
29	Jesse Barfield	RF	1981–1989	
19	José Bautista	RF	2008–2017	
11	George Bell	LF	1981, 1983–1990	
35	Denis Boucher	P	1991	
29, 43	Joe Carter	OF/1B	1991–1997	
—	Tom Cheek	Broadcaster	1977–2004	
6, 21, 25	Carlos Delgado	1B	1993–2004	
—	Jacques Doucet	Broadcaster	2011–present	Born in Montreal, elected mainly for his broadcasting career with Montreal Expos
20, 22, 40	Rob Ducey	OF	1987–1992, 2000	Born in Toronto, raised in Cambridge
1	Tony Fernández	SS	1983–1990, 1993; 1998–1999, 2001	
35	Jeff Francis	P	2015	Born in Vancouver, British Columbia, attended University of British Columbia
43	Cito Gaston	Manager	1989–1997; 2008–2010	
—	Pat Gillick	GM	1978–1994	
—	Paul Godfrey	Executive	2000–2008	
32, 52	Roy Halladay	P	1998–2009	
—	Peter Hardy	Executive	1976–1993	Born in Toronto, Ontario
50	Tom Henke	P	1985–1992	
41	Pat Hentgen	P	1991–1999, 2004	
22	Jimmy Key	P	1984–1992	
47	Corey Koskie	3B	2005	Born in Anola, Manitoba, attended University of Manitoba
—	Tony Kubek	Broadcaster	1977–1989	
55	Russell Martin	C	2015–2018	
3	Bobby Mattick	Manager	1980–1981	
39	Dave McKay	2B/3B	1977–1979	Born in Vancouver, British Columbia
15	Lloyd Moseby	CF	1980–1989	
9	John Olerud	1B	1989–1996	
48	Paul Quantrill	P	1996–2001	Born in London, Ontario
—	Jim Ridley	Scout	1976–2002	Born in Toronto
—	Gladwyn Scott	Scout	1987–1993	Born in Hamiota, Manitoba
24	Matt Stairs	OF/DH/1B	2007–2008	Born in Saint John, New Brunswick, grew up in Fredericton, New Brunswick
—	Howard Starkman	Executive	1976–2014	Born in Toronto
37	Dave Stieb	P	1979–1992, 1998	
31	Duane Ward	P	1986–1995	
12	Ernie Whitt	C	1977–1978, 1980–1989	

=== Retired numbers ===
Jackie Robinson's number was retired by every team in MLB on April 15, 1997.

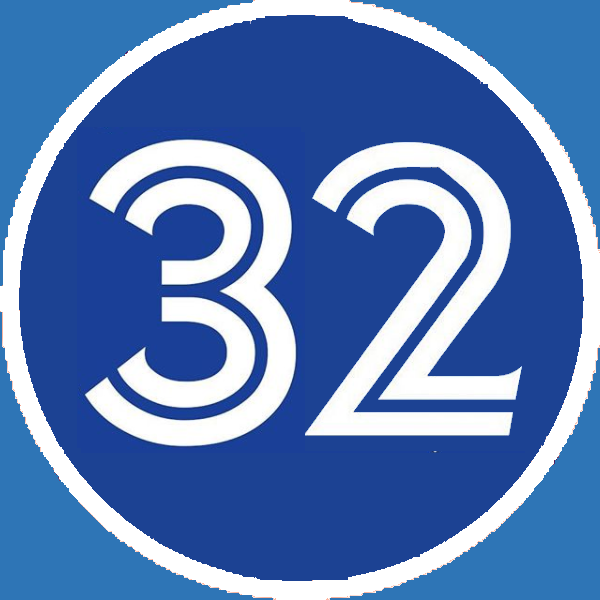
Roy
Halladay
P
Retired March 29, 2018
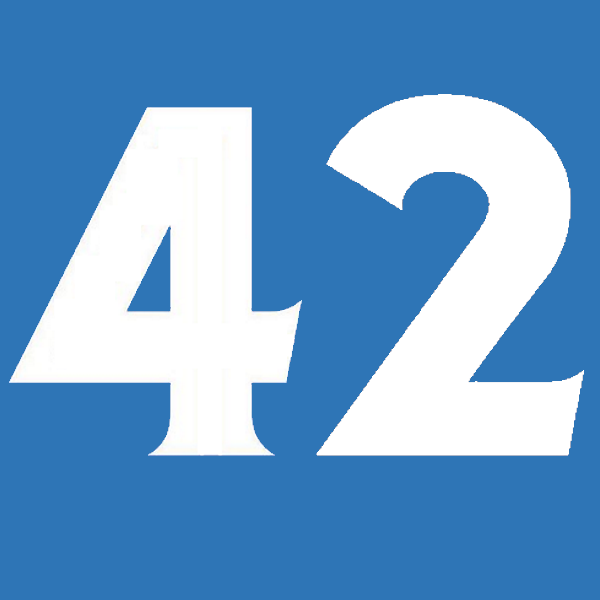
Jackie
Robinson
All MLB
Honored April 15, 1997

Soon after becoming the first person to be inducted in the Hall of Fame as a Blue Jay, on July 31, 2011, second baseman Roberto Alomar was the first person to have his number, #12, retired by the Blue Jays. However, #12 was unretired due to controversies surrounding Alomar. Jordan Hicks became the first Blue Jay since 2011 to wear this number in 2023.

On March 29, 2018, the Blue Jays retired #32 in honour of Roy Halladay, who died in an airplane crash on November 7, 2017, becoming the second number to be retired by the Blue Jays.

=== Hall of Excellence ===
In 1996, the Blue Jays instituted a "Level of Excellence" on the 500 level of the Rogers Centre, honouring "tremendous individual achievement."

- Tony Fernández (SS, 3B: 1983–1990, 1993, 1998–1999, 2001)
- George Bell (LF: 1981–1990)
- Carlos Delgado (1B: 1993–2004)
- Joe Carter (RF, 1B: 1991–1997)
- Dave Stieb (P: 1979–1992, 1998)
- Cito Gaston (manager: 1989–1997, 2008–2010)
- Tom Cheek (broadcaster: 1977–2005)
- Paul Beeston (VP: 1976–1989; president: 1989–1997, 2008–2015)
- Roy Halladay (P: 1998–2009)
- Pat Gillick (GM: 1978–1994)
- José Bautista (RF, 3B: 2008–2017)
- Buck Martinez (C: 1981–1986; broadcaster: 1987–2000, 2010–2025; manager: 2001–2002)

Players' uniform numbers are listed, and in Tom Cheek's case, the number of consecutive games he called for the Blue Jays; most these numbers have not been retired. During the 2013 All-Star Break, the Level of Excellence was redesigned for the addition of Carlos Delgado's name. The redesign removed all uniform numbers from the Level of Excellence aside from Roberto Alomar's then-retired #12, Roy Halladay's retired #32 and Tom Cheek's 4306 consecutive called games streak. On April 30, 2021, the Blue Jays announced that they would remove Alomar from the Level of Excellence and take down his banner at Rogers Centre after he was banned from baseball for sexual harassment.

On March 19, 2026, the Blue Jays organization announced that the Level of Excellence would be transformed into the new Hall of Excellence, with all existing members being moved into the new Hall, which would open on August 29. It was also announced that the team's first inductee into the new Hall would be former player, manager, and broadcaster Buck Martinez, who retired from calling games during the 2025-26 offseason.

== Charity and partnerships ==
The Jays Care Foundation is the charitable arm of the Toronto Blue Jays baseball organization and conducts events to support local organizations and community members. They also provide baseball education and life skill workshops to the youth of communities across Canada. The Jays Care Foundation is mainly funded by the Blue Jays 50/50 tickets.

== Notes ==
Awards and achievements
Preceded by Minnesota Twins; 1991	World Series champions 1992–1993	Succeeded by Atlanta Braves; 1995
Preceded by Minnesota Twins; 1991	American League champions 1992–1993	Succeeded by Cleveland Indians; 1995
Preceded by New York Yankees; 2024	American League champions 2025	Succeeded by Tampa Bay Rays; 2026
