= Michael Keogh (athlete) =

Irish middle-distance runner

Personal information
- Nationality: Irish
- Born: March 24, 1953 (age 73) Unspecified, Ireland

Sport
- Sport: Track
- Event(s): 5000 meters, 10,000 meters
- College team: Manhattan College

Achievements and titles
- Personal best(s): 5000 meters: 13:36.6; 10,000 meters: 28:49.8

Michael Keogh (born October 13, 1950) is a retired Irish middle-distance runner. He competed at the 1972 Summer Olympics in the 5000 metres.

Keogh attended Essex Catholic High School and Manhattan College where he ran track for the Jaspers. Along with Anthony Colón, Keogh won the team 1973 NCAA Men's Division I Indoor Track and Field Championships and was part of the distance medley relay championship team.
