= Paul Beeston =

Canadian sports executive (born 1945)

- Born: Paul McGill Beeston; June 20, 1945 (age 81); Welland, Ontario, Canada
- Education: University of Western Ontario
- Known for: Major League Baseball executive
- Awards: Order of Canada
- Baseball career

Member of the Canadian

Baseball Hall of Fame
- Induction: 2002

Beeston is a member of the Toronto Blue Jays' Level of Excellence

Paul McGill Beeston CM (born June 20, 1945) is a Canadian former professional baseball executive. He was the president and chief operating officer of Major League Baseball (MLB) from 1997 to 2002, and the president of the Toronto Blue Jays from 1989 to 1997, and again from 2008 to 2015. He also worked as the president of the Toronto Argonauts of the Canadian Football League (CFL) in 1994.

Beeston retired on October 31, 2015, and was replaced by Mark Shapiro as president and CEO of the Blue Jays. On September 20, 2016, he was named the President Emeritus of the Toronto Blue Jays.

== Career ==
Beeston earned a Bachelor of Arts degree in economics and political science from Huron University College at the University of Western Ontario in 1967. He obtained his Chartered Accountant designation in 1971 and worked for Coopers & Lybrand until 1976.

Beeston was the first employee of the Toronto Blue Jays, joining in 1976. He became vice president of business operations in 1977, executive vice president in 1984, president and chief operating officer in 1989, then was named president and chief executive officer in 1991. In 1994, he served as president of the CFL's Toronto Argonauts. From 1997 until 2002, he was president and chief operating officer of Major League Baseball.

In 1988, Beeston was named a Member of the Order of Canada. In 1998, he was elected to the board of directors of the Baseball Hall of Fame and in 2002 was inducted into the Canadian Baseball Hall of Fame.

He is a fellow of the Institute of Chartered Accountants of Ontario, and was awarded an honorary doctor of laws degree from the University of Western Ontario in 1994 and an honorary doctor of social sciences from Niagara University in 2001.

He was placed in the Blue Jays' Level of Excellence at Rogers Centre on April 4, 2008 prior to the Jays' home opener versus the Boston Red Sox.

After Paul Godfrey resigned as team president and CEO on September 29, 2008, it was announced that Beeston would return to the Blue Jays as interim president and CEO on October 14, 2008 where his primary responsibility was to identify and hire his own successor.

After a "very honest, straightforward and exhaustive search" the Blue Jays and Beeston decided on removing the interim tag, naming Beeston president and CEO on October 27, 2009.

On January 26, 2015, Beeston announced he would retire as president and CEO of the Blue Jays on October 31, 2015. On August 31, Cleveland Indians president Mark Shapiro was announced as Beeston's successor. Beeston retired on October 31, 2015, and Shapiro officially assumed the role of president of the organization. On September 20, 2016, he was named the President Emeritus of the Toronto Blue Jays.

== Personal life ==
Beeston is married to Kaye, and has a daughter, Aimee, and son, David, the executive vice president and chief strategy officer of MLB's Boston Red Sox.

Preceded by Peter Hardy (Chairman and CEO)	Toronto Blue Jays president and CEO; 1989–1997	Succeeded by Sam Pollock (Chairman and CEO)
Preceded by	Major League Baseball president 1997–2002	Succeeded by Bob DuPuy
Preceded by Paul Godfrey	Toronto Blue Jays president and CEO; 2008–2015	Succeeded by Mark Shapiro
