= Brother Jasper =

American college baseball coach

Biographical details
- Born: July 1, 1829; County Kilkenny, Ireland
- Died: April 9, 1895 (aged 65); New York, New York, U.S.

Coaching career (HC unless noted)
- 1863–1894: Manhattan

Brother Jasper of Mary, FSC (July 1, 1829 – April 4, 1895) was an American baseball coach and administrator at Manhattan College.

== Early life ==
Jasper was born Joseph Brennan on July 1, 1829, in County Kilkenny, Ireland. He moved to St. Louis and attended the Academy of the Christian Brothers. He became a member of the De La Salle Brothers on November 1, 1851, and took the name Brother Jasper of Mary.

== Manhattan College ==
In 1861, Jasper became prefect of students at Manhattan College. He was also the school's athletic director, resident student adviser, and chief disciplinarian. He founded Manhattan's first band, orchestra, glee club and several literary clubs, and in 1863, started the school's first baseball team. Manhattan College's athletic teams were called the Jaspers in honor of Brother Jasper. In 1926, the school formally adopted the nickname. In 1882, during the seventh inning of a game against the New York Metropolitans, Jasper instructed restless students to stand and stretch until play resumed. Although it is not the only origin story for the seventh-inning stretch, former National Baseball Hall of Fame and Museum curator Ted Spencer said that it was the one with the "most substance [and] is the one best documented". Jasper died of "congestion of the lung" on April 9, 1895, and was buried at Calvary Cemetery in Queens.
