= Peter Hardy (baseball executive) =

Canadian brewer and baseball executive

- Born: Norman Edgar Hardy; January 4, 1917; Toronto, Ontario, Canada
- Died: November 22, 1997 (aged 80); London, Ontario, Canada
- Occupation: Brewer
- Employer: Labatt Brewing Company
- Known for: Toronto Blue Jays executive
- Baseball career

Member of the Canadian

Baseball Hall of Fame
- Induction: 2004

Norman Edgar "Peter" Hardy (January 4, 1917 – November 22, 1997) was a Canadian brewer and one of the founding baseball executives of the Toronto Blue Jays of Major League Baseball (MLB).

Hardy was born in Toronto in 1917, and served in the Royal Canadian Navy during World War II. He joined Labatt Brewing Company in 1949, became a vice president in 1962, and served as president from 1964 to 1968. He then moved to the parent company, John Labatt Ltd., of which he became chairman in 1980.

In 1976, Hardy was named to the board of directors of the Toronto Blue Jays; the team joined the American League the following year. He became chairman and CEO in 1982, and held those positions until 1989. In April 1985, sportswriter Steve Wulf of Sports Illustrated rated Hardy as baseball's best executive in a story naming MLB's "dream team".

He was married to his wife Dorothy, and had two daughters.

Hardy died in 1997 at age 80. He was inducted to the Canadian Baseball Hall of Fame in 2004.

Sporting positions
Preceded by Peter Bavasi (President and CEO)	Toronto Blue Jays Chairman and CEO; 1982–1989	Succeeded by Paul Beeston (President and CEO) and Sam Pollock (Chairman)
