= Seventh-inning stretch =

Break during a baseball game

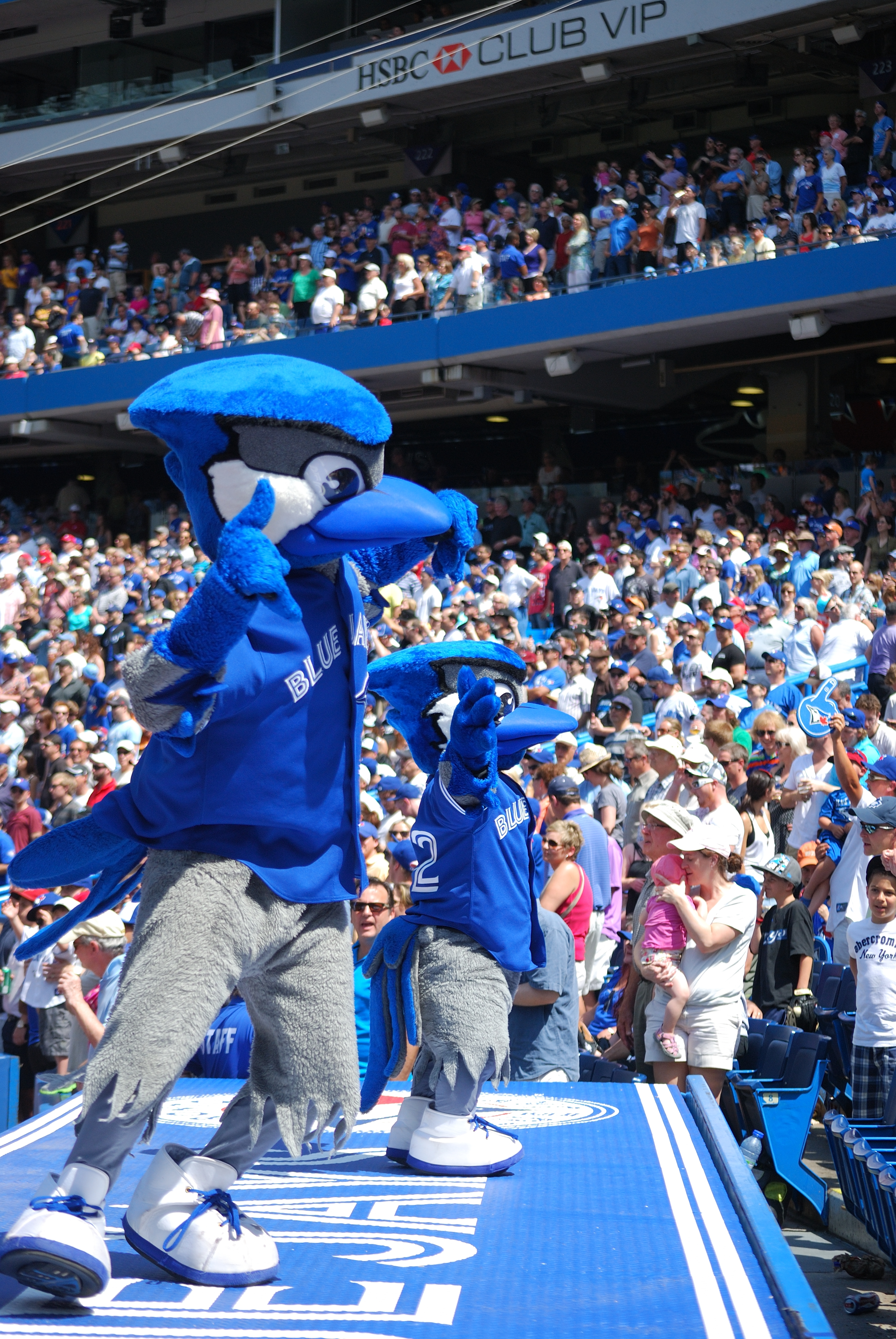
Mascots Ace and Junior and fans at a Toronto Blue Jays home game during a seventh-inning stretch

In baseball in the United States and Canada, the seventh-inning stretch (also known as the Lucky 7 in Japan and South Korea) is a long-standing tradition that takes place between the halves of the seventh inning of a game. Fans generally stand up and stretch out their arms and legs and sometimes walk around. It is a popular time to get a late-game snack or an alcoholic beverage, as alcohol sales often cease after the last out of the seventh inning. The stretch also serves as a short break for the players.

Most ballparks in professional baseball mark this point of the game by playing the crowd sing-along song "Take Me Out to the Ball Game". If a game goes into a fifth extra inning, a similar "fourteenth-inning stretch" is celebrated. In softball games, amateur baseball games scheduled for only seven innings (little league plays usually six), or in minor-league doubleheaders, a "fifth-inning stretch" may be substituted.

In Japan, the seventh-inning stretch consists of two parts: one after the end of the 6th inning, where the away team's fight song is played, as fans are encouraged to sing along. The second part is after the top of the 7th inning, when the home team's fight song is played. Every team has a unique fight song that is played regardless of where they play on a given day.

== Origin ==
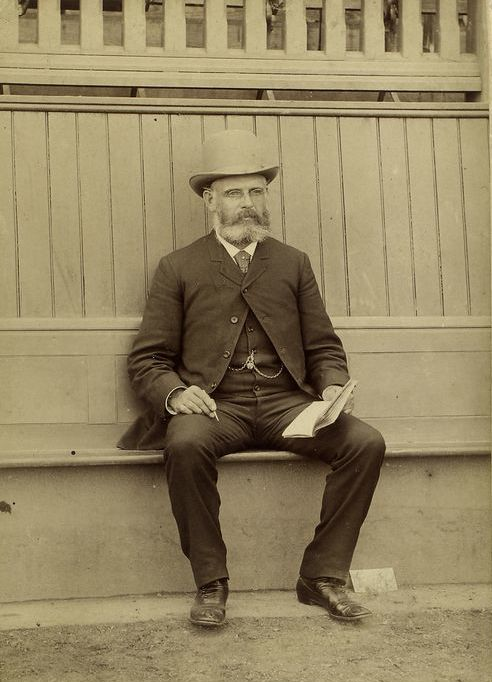
Harry Wright, first to report the seventh-inning stretch in 1869—in the second inning

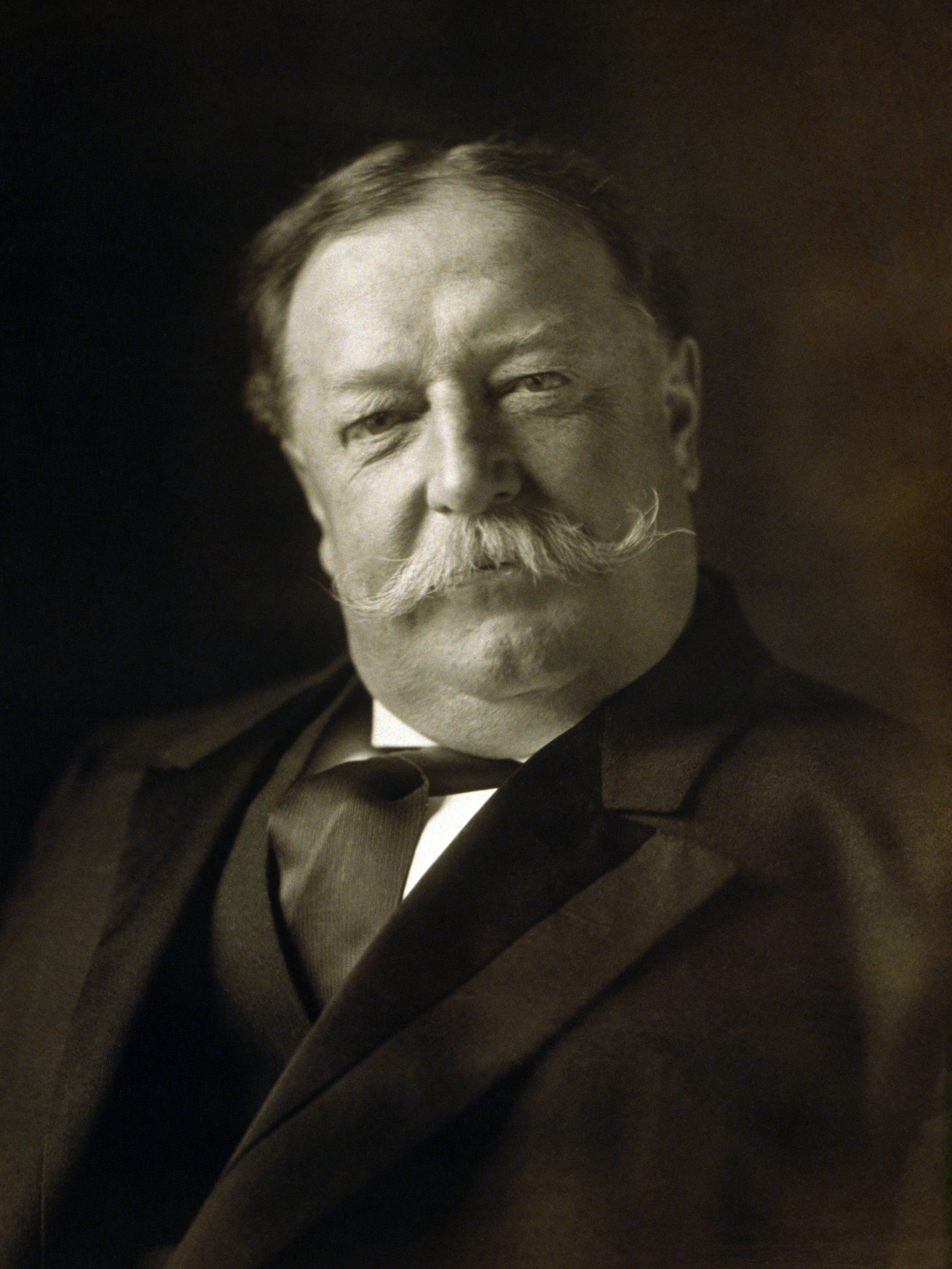
William Howard Taft, first U.S. president to observe the seventh-inning stretch in 1910

The origin of the seventh-inning stretch tradition is much disputed, and it is difficult to certify any definite history.

One claimant is Brother Jasper (Brennan) of Mary, F.S.C., the man credited with bringing baseball to Manhattan University in New York City. Being the Prefect of Discipline as well as the coach of the team, it fell to Brother Jasper to supervise the student fans at every home game. On one particularly hot and muggy day in June 1882, during the seventh inning against a semi-pro team called the Metropolitans, the Prefect noticed his charges becoming restless. To break the tension, he called a timeout in the game and instructed everyone in the bleachers to stand up and unwind. It worked so well he began calling for a seventh-inning rest period at every game. The Manhattan University custom spread to the major leagues after the New York Giants were charmed by it at an exhibition game.

In June 1869 the New York Herald published a report on a game between the Cincinnati Red Stockings and the Brooklyn Eagles (home team): "At the close of the long second inning, the laughable stand up and stretch was indulged in all round the field."

Whether a stretch was observed nationwide is not known, but later in 1869 the Cincinnati Commercial reported on a game that was played on the West Coast between the Red Stockings and the Eagle Club of San Francisco: "One thing noticeable in this game was a ten minutes' intermission at the end of the sixth inning – a dodge to advertise and have the crowd patronize the bar."

However, a letter written in 1869 by Harry Wright (1835–1895), manager of the Cincinnati Red Stockings documented something very similar to a seventh-inning stretch, making the following observation about the Cincinnati fans' ballpark behavior: "The spectators all arise between halves of the seventh inning, extend their legs and arms and sometimes walk about. In so doing they enjoy the relief afforded by relaxation from a long posture upon hard benches." Another tale holds that the stretch was invented by a manager stalling for time to warm up a relief pitcher.

On October 18, 1889, Game 1 of the 1889 World Series saw a seventh-inning stretch after somebody yelled "stretch for luck".

A popular story for the origin of the seventh-inning stretch is that on April 14, 1910, on opening day, 6 ft 2 in (188 cm), 350-pound (160 kg), President William Howard Taft was sore from prolonged sitting at a game between the Washington Senators and the Philadelphia Athletics and stood up to stretch, causing the crowd to feel obligated to join their president in his gestures. This story is set at a far later date than the others, however, so he may only have given the presidential seal of approval to a longstanding tradition; the story that his physical problems forced him to stand up contradict this, but he might have just been waiting for the proper accepted time to relieve his pain; either way, he gave national publicity to the practice.

As to the name, there appears to be no written record of the term "seventh-inning stretch" before 1920.

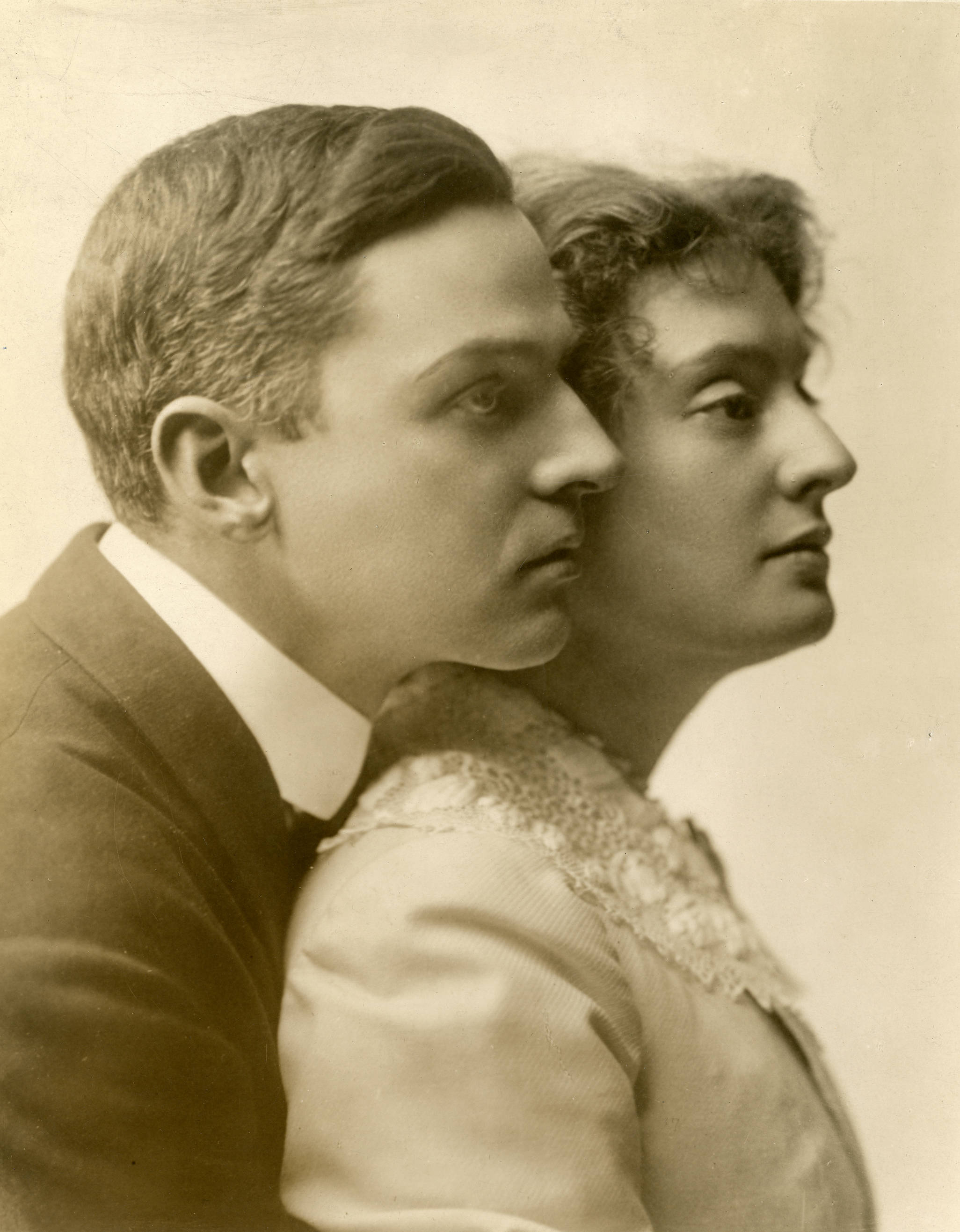
Jack Norworth (1879–1959) (left), lyricist of the 1908 song "Take Me Out to the Ball Game". It was first sung by Norworth's then-wife, Nora Bayes (right), c. 1910.

== Current practice ==
In modern baseball, standing up and singing "Take Me Out to the Ball Game" during the seventh-inning stretch is a popular tradition. It was first played at a ballpark at a high school in Los Angeles, California in 1934. The composers, Jack Norworth (1879–1959) (lyrics) and Albert Von Tilzer (1878–1956) (music), had both never attended an actual baseball game prior to writing this popular song. Norworth only attended his first Major League game much later in 1940.

There has yet to be a certain date when the tradition began, but the practice gained exceptional popularity from broadcaster Harry Caray. Caray would sing the song to himself in the broadcast booth during the stretch while a play-by-play announcer for the Chicago White Sox. After hearing him sing one day, White Sox owner Bill Veeck Jr., the famed baseball promoter, had Caray's microphone turned on so that the ballpark could hear him sing. When Caray moved into the Chicago Cubs broadcast booth, he continued the practice, sparking what has become a Cubs tradition by regularly leading the crowd in singing the song in every seventh-inning stretch. Since his death, the Cubs have invited various celebrities to lead the crowd during the stretch, including James Belushi, John Cusack, Mike Ditka, Michael J. Fox, Cookie Monster, Bill Murray, Dan Patrick, Ozzy Osbourne, Eddie Vedder, C.M. Punk, Mr. T and Billy Corgan.

== Team traditions ==
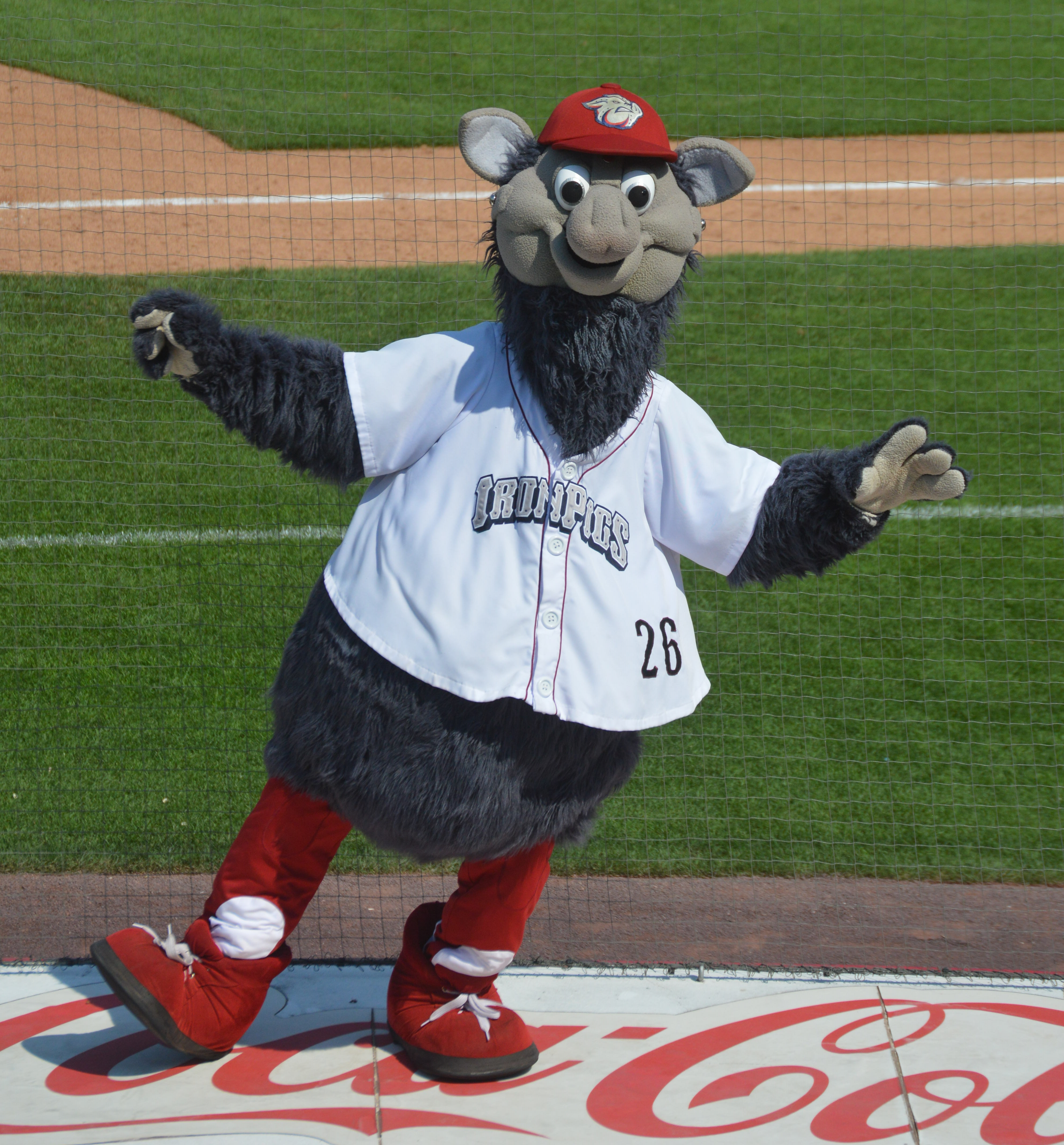
FeRROUS, one of two mascots for the Lehigh Valley IronPigs, the Triple-A affiliate of the Philadelphia Phillies, performs during the seventh-inning stretch at Coca-Cola Park in Allentown, Pennsylvania, August 2018

Many teams will also play a local traditional song either before or after "Take Me Out to the Ball Game". Since 1975, the Baltimore Orioles have often played the raucous John Denver song "Thank God I'm a Country Boy" at the conclusion of "Take Me Out to the Ball Game". During the bridge of the song, in which Denver holds a long note, fans yell "Ooooooooh!" (since the name Orioles is often shortened to the "O's".) The Atlanta Braves also play this song after "Take Me Out to the Ball Game".

Jane Jarvis, the organist at the New York Mets' home Shea Stadium from 1964 to 1979, played the "Mexican Hat Dance" during the stretch. After the Mets switched to recorded music, "Take Me Out to the Ball Game" became standard. In recent decades, the Lou Monte tune "Lazy Mary" has followed it, a practice that has continued since the team's move to Citi Field.

When the St. Louis Cardinals were owned by Anheuser-Busch, Busch Memorial Stadium organist Ernie Hays played "Here Comes the King", a commonly recognized jingle for Budweiser beer, during the stretch. On Opening Day, during playoff games and on "big nights" such as games against the Chicago Cubs, a team of Budweiser's mascot Clydesdale horses would also make a circuit of the warning track. Since Anheuser-Busch's sale of the Cardinals in 1996, "Take Me Out to the Ball Game" has been played in the middle of the 7th inning, with "Here Comes The King" at the top of the 8th. Often, "Take Me Out to the Ball Game" is followed by an instrumental rendition of "Meet Me in St. Louis, Louis". The Clydesdales still appear on Opening Day and during the playoffs. The tradition remained upon moving to Busch Stadium in 2006.

The Toronto Blue Jays take the term "seventh-inning stretch" literally, as Health Canada officials lead fans at Rogers Centre in stretching exercises while the club's song "OK Blue Jays" plays before "Take Me Out to the Ball Game".

The Texas Rangers initially played only "Cotton-Eyed Joe" during the seventh-inning stretch. When the team moved to their new facility in 1994, The Ballpark in Arlington (now Choctaw Stadium), "Take Me Out to the Ball Game" was added to seventh-inning stretch, followed by "Cotton-Eyed Joe". Somewhat unusual for a 7th-inning stretch song, the version of "Cotton-Eyed Joe" played is an instrumental, by Al Dean from the album Plays for Urban Cowboys. Rather than singing along, the crowd claps along and stomps their feet to the tune. Currently, the Rangers, as well as the Washington Nationals, present a live performance of "God Bless America" before "Take Me Out to the Ball Game,"

"God Bless America" also precedes "Take Me Out to the Ball Game" during the seventh-inning stretch of New York Yankees home games, and Robert Merrill's rendition of the former song is played.

The Minnesota Twins play "Little Red Corvette" by Minneapolis-born musician Prince, due to the tradition that rookies and newly traded players know the lyrics to the song.

Other clubs traditionally play songs after "Take Me Out to the Ball Game". The Cincinnati Reds play "Cincinnati, Ohio" by Connie Smith, the Milwaukee Brewers play "Beer Barrel Polka" in reference to the city's beermaking heritage, the Houston Astros play "Deep in the Heart of Texas", the Los Angeles Angels play "Good 4 U" by Southern California-based singer-songwriter Olivia Rodrigo, the Seattle Mariners play "Louie Louie" a song that is popular in Washington, the Colorado Rockies play DJ Ötzi's version of "Hey Baby", the Pittsburgh Pirates play "We Are Family" as a homage to the slogan used in the 1979 season, and the Washington Nationals play "Take On Me" by A-ha, a song that became popular with Nationals fans during the 2012 season when Michael Morse used it as his walk-up music.

The Florida Marlins, attempting to mimic the Blue Jays' exercising song in their inaugural year of 1993, created a group of dancers, some former University of Miami Sunsations or Miami Heat dancers, and called the group "The Seventh Inning Stretchers". At the first game this group came onto the field at the top of the 7th inning, and the crowd was encouraged to stand and stretch, and do a choreographed dance to Gloria Estefan's song "Get on Your Feet". The crowd, thinking it was the actual 7th-inning stretch, booed loudly. The group appeared at a second game the following evening but was booed again and was never seen following that game.

Similarly, in Banana Ball, popularized by the Savannah Bananas barnstorming baseball team, in the middle of the 4th inning, both teams lead the entire stadium in a choreographed "Hey Baby" dance instead of singing "Take Me Out to the Ballgame."

=== 8th inning traditions ===
Many teams have 8th inning traditions as well. In 2020 and 2021, when MLB began to shorten doubleheader games to 7 innings, the traditions continued for doubleheaders only if the games proceed to an 8th inning (marking extra innings).

While all thirty Major League franchises currently sing the traditional "Take Me Out to the Ball Game" in the seventh inning, several other teams will play their local favorite between the top and bottom of the eighth inning. For example, the Boston Red Sox play "Sweet Caroline" by Neil Diamond. A notable occurrence happened in June 2011 when during the playing of the song, the city's NHL franchise, the Boston Bruins, captured the Stanley Cup following a 7-game series against the Vancouver Canucks, and many fans cheered after the announcement was made. Following the Boston Marathon bombing, several teams (including Boston's archrival, the New York Yankees) temporarily played "Sweet Caroline" in the middle of the eighth inning as well, or at other times during the game, as a means of showing solidarity with the City of Boston. The New York Mets have previously used "Sweet Caroline" but have since dropped it. After experimenting with it during select games during the 2014 season, the Mets began to implement "Piano Man" by Billy Joel as a full-time sing along. Similarly, starting in 2008, the Kansas City Royals began to play "Friends in Low Places" by celebrity supporter and one-time spring training invitee Garth Brooks during the middle of the 8th.

The Los Angeles Dodgers also hold an 8th inning tradition, with fans singing "Don't Stop Believin'" by Journey. The practice came under controversy when the song's author, Steve Perry, a Bay Area native and San Francisco Giants fan, asked the Dodgers to stop the tradition. The team refused and continue to play the song through the 2013 season. The Minnesota Twins, who played the same song, ended the tradition upon moving to Target Field in 2010.

The Journey song "Lights" is frequently played at San Francisco Giants baseball games (including a version led by Perry himself in the middle of the 8th inning during Game 2 of the 2010 World Series) and the cross-bay Oakland Athletics after-game fireworks starts.

The Detroit Tigers also play the beginning of "Don't Stop Believin'" in the eighth inning, showing the lyrics on the big screen. The Washington Nationals play "Baby Shark" in the middle of the 8th inning, in honor of Gerardo Parra's walkup song and their first and only World Series title. The Oakland Athletics played Bay Area native MC Hammer's "2 Legit 2 Quit" during the middle of the eighth. The Cleveland Guardians play "Hang on Sloopy", Ohio's official rock song, during the middle of the 8th, and fans spell out O-H-I-O at the appropriate times within the song (similar to Ohio State University and other Cleveland sporting events). The San Diego Padres play Blink-182's "All The Small Things" during the middle of the 8th. The New York Yankees used to play "Cotton Eyed Joe" in the 8th inning.

The Toronto Blue Jays began a new 8th inning tradition in 2024. During the middle of the inning, the stadium plays "Hey Baby" by DJ Ötzi, leading the fans in a dance while showing the lyrics on the screen. During the 2nd time the chorus plays, the music will occasionally turn off, allowing the fans to sing the famous chant a cappella. The tradition began after a 14 inning game on May 31st, 2024, when the fans that remained in the stadium began singing the chorus to "Hey Baby" repeatedly as the game continued further into extra innings. The game concluded when Davis Schneider hit a walk-off home run, beating the Pittsburgh Pirates 5-3.

=== 6th inning traditions ===
After the Tampa Bay Devil Rays' 1998 home opener, they played the popular Jimmy Buffett song "Fins" after the 6th inning, rather than the 7th-inning stretch. The grounds crew sent on the field after the 6th inning wore tropical clothing, and everyone in the park formed their arms into fins for the "Fins to the left, fins to the right" portions of the song. This tradition was dropped several years later.

Between the top and bottom of the 6th inning, the New York Yankees play "Y.M.C.A." by Village People while the grounds crew cleans the infield. During the chorus, the grounds crew drop their tools and do the "YMCA" dance with their arms. The middle of the 6th inning at Milwaukee Brewers games is time for the Sausage Race, when people running in costumes for the bratwurst, Polish sausage, Italian sausage, hot dog and chorizo get up to 45,000 fans on their feet as they race around the clay dirt near the dugouts of American Family Field. Other teams hold similar races. The Pittsburgh Pirates hold the "Great Pittsburgh Pierogi Race N'At" (also called the Great Pierogi Race) during the fifth inning at home games, where people dressed as cartoon cheese, sauerkraut, jalapeño, potato, onion, and bacon pierogies run around the warning track at PNC Park. This race is often combined with visiting mascots such as the Brewers' sausages or the Nationals' presidents.

== See also ==
- Half-time
