= Manhattan University =

Catholic university in New York City, New York, US

Coordinates: 40°53′22″N 73°54′7″W

- Former names: Academy of the Holy Infancy (1853–1863); Manhattan College (1863–2024)
- Motto: Signum Fidei (Latin)
- Motto in English: Sign of the Faith
- Type: Private university
- Established: 1853; 173 years ago
- Religious affiliation: Roman Catholic (Lasallian)
- Academic affiliations: ACCU; NAICU; Annapolis Group; CLAC; Oberlin Group
- Endowment: $114.9 million (2020)
- President: Frederick Bonato
- Provost: Kenny Sumner
- Students: 3,227 (fall 2024)
- Undergraduates: 2,746 (fall 2024)
- Postgraduates: 481 (fall 2024)
- Location: New York City, New York, United States
- Campus: Urban, 22 acres (8.9 ha)
- Colors: Kelly green and white
- Nickname: Jaspers / Lady Jaspers
- Sporting affiliations: NCAA Division I – MAAC
- Website: www.manhattan.edu

Manhattan University (previously Manhattan College) is a private, Catholic university in New York City, New York, US. Originally established in 1853 by the De La Salle Christian Brothers (Institute of the Brothers of the Christian Schools) as an academy for day students, it was later incorporated as an institution of higher education through a charter granted by the New York State Board of Regents. In 1922, it moved from Manhattan to the Riverdale section of the Bronx, roughly 6.4 miles (10.3 km) north of its original location on 131st Street in Manhattanville.

== History ==
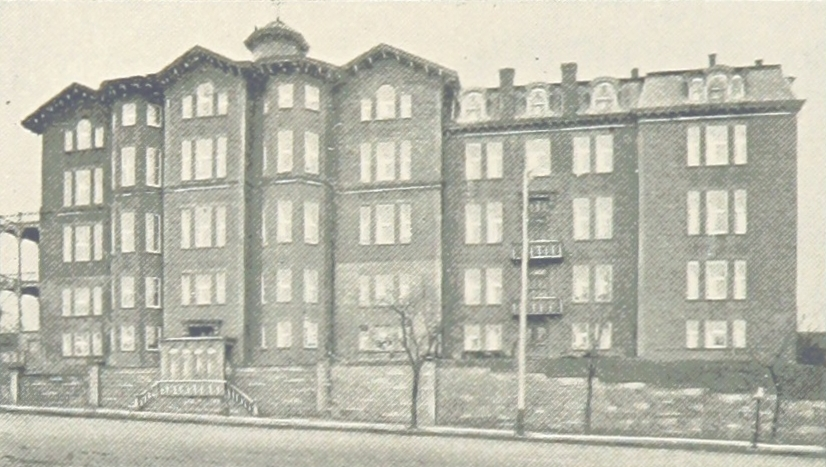
Manhattan College, Boulevard (Broadway) and West 131st Street, early 1890s

The Quad in 1923

Manhattan University was founded as the Academy of the Holy Infancy in 1853 by five French De La Salle Christian Brothers in a small building on Canal Street. When the need to expand forced them from Lower Manhattan, the college moved to 131st Street and Broadway, in the Manhattanville section of Harlem. The school's name was changed to Manhattan College when it received its state charter in 1863 from the Board of Regents, and moved to its present location in the Riverdale section of the Bronx in 1922 as it outgrew its facilities in Manhattanville. This is often the cause of some confusion as the college is located outside of Manhattan but still within the city limits of New York City. In 2024, the school changed its name to Manhattan University.

The Riverdale campus housed both the College and a preparatory school for high school students, Manhattan College High School, also known as Manhattan Prep. The high school had team sports and was in the Catholic High School Athletic Association. Manhattan College High School closed in 1971.

Originally exclusive to men, Manhattan University established a co-institutional, cooperative program with the College of Mount Saint Vincent in 1963. Later the pair became coeducational in 1973 and 1974, respectively. This partnership lasted until 2007. Since then, Manhattan University and the College of Mount Saint Vincent have operated as completely unaffiliated institutions.

In 2018, Thomas O'Malley (Class of 1963) donated $25 million, the largest donation in the institution's history. The institution's business school has since been renamed the O'Malley School of Business.

=== Declining enrollment and growing deficits (2023–present) ===
In late 2023 and early 2024, Manhattan College eliminated more than twenty major and minor programs and terminated over 25% of faculty due to persistent declining enrollment and increasing structural deficits. In late January 2024, faculty voted "no confidence" in the college's president. From 2020 to 2024, enrollment at Manhattan College decreased by over 30%. Manhattan merged three of the college's six schools, creating three new schools. The bond-rating agency Fitch Ratings downgraded the college’s outlook to negative in March 2024.

In August 2024, Manhattan College officials announced that the college would be renamed Manhattan University; the renaming was intended to attract students.

== Campus ==
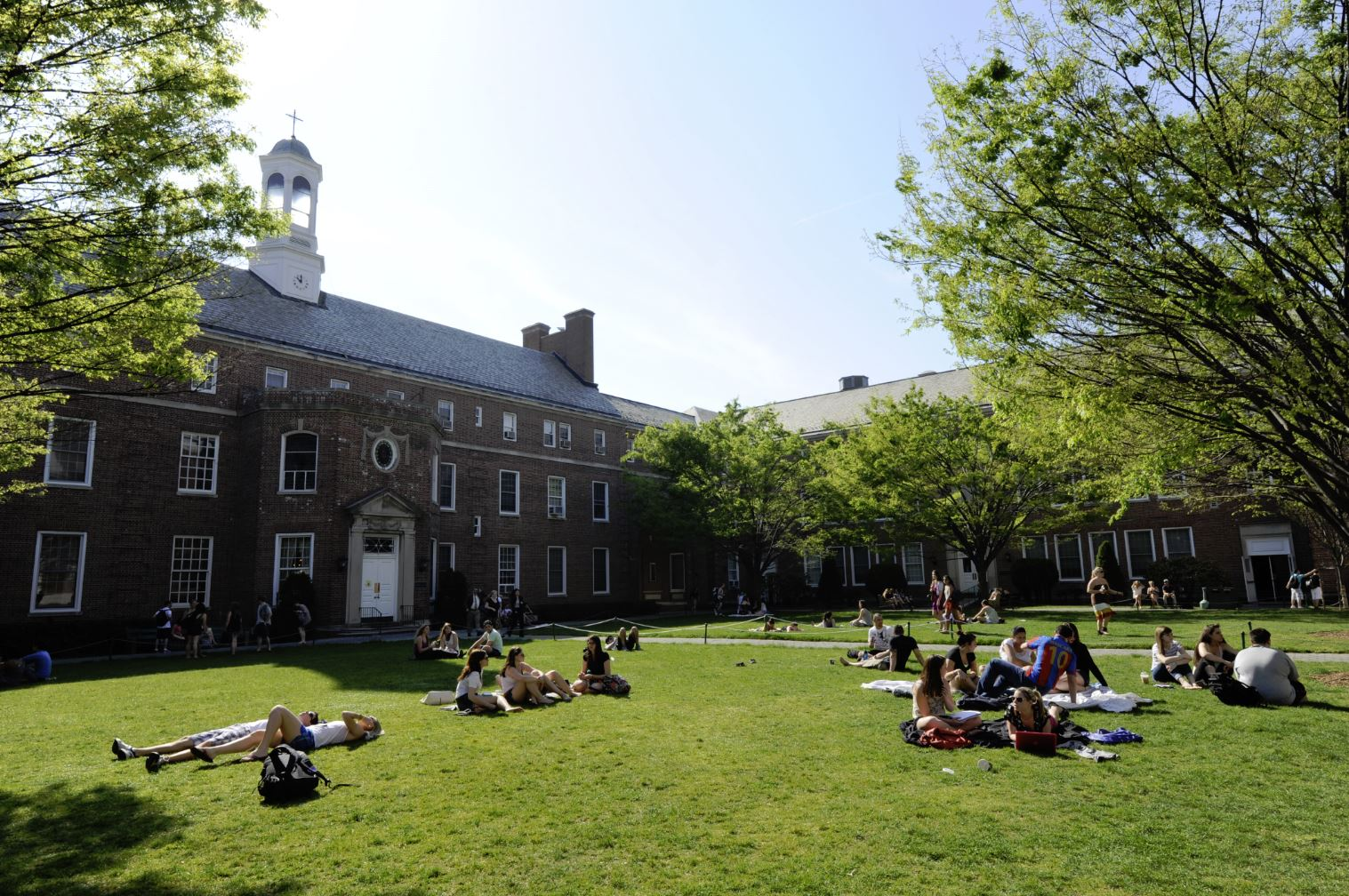
The Quad

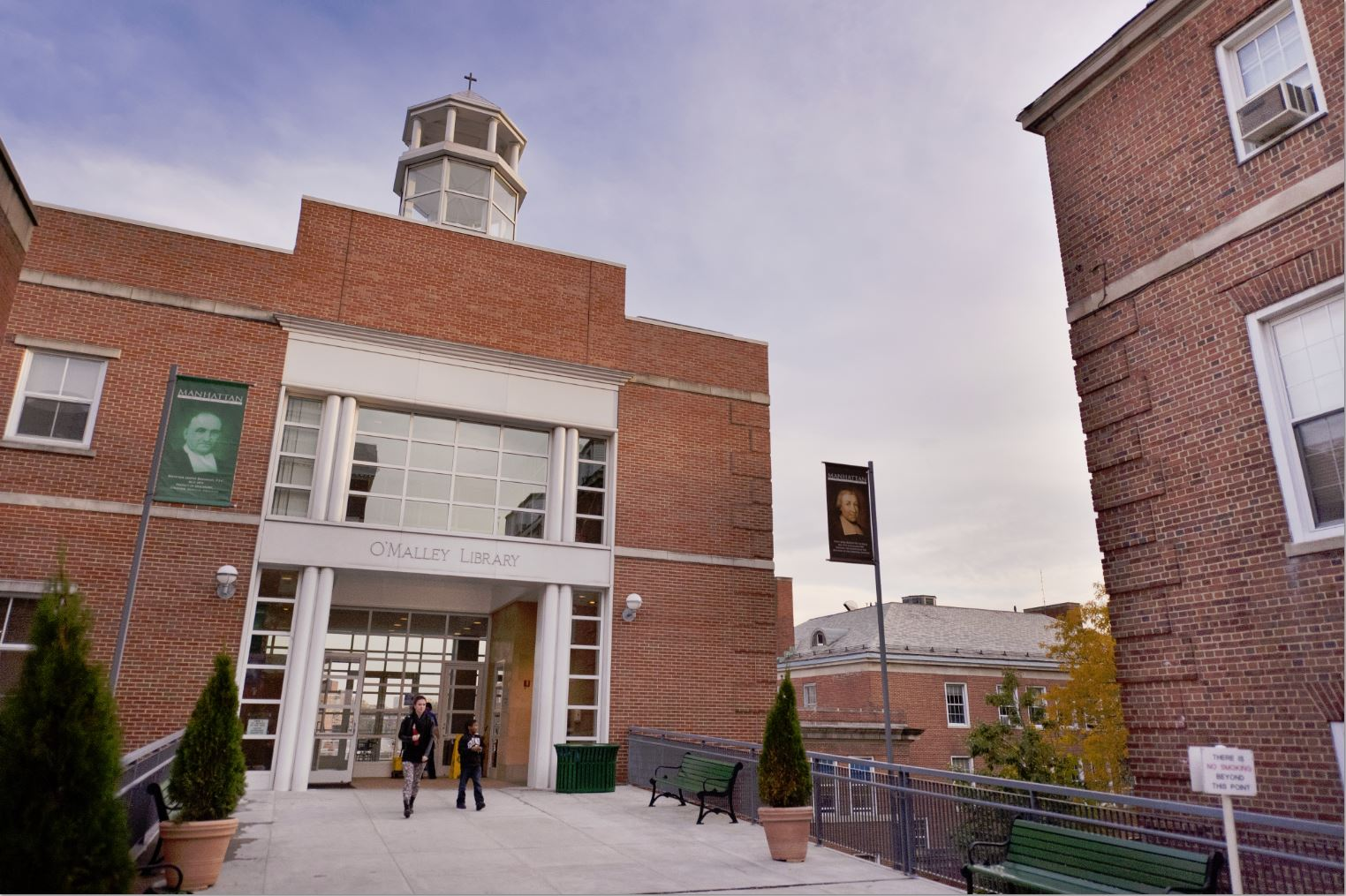
O'Malley Library

Manhattan University occupies a relatively compact campus divided into a north and south campus in the residential Riverdale section of the Bronx. The North campus overlooks Van Cortlandt Park, and has as its focal point "the Quad", which sits at the center of the campus's four main buildings. Memorial Hall is the main entry onto campus and houses the office of the president as well as most of the other administrative offices on campus. Miguel Hall and De La Salle Hall are the main academic halls that border each side of the Quad. Miguel hosts the liberal arts department and classes, while De La Salle is primarily used by the O'Malley School of Business. The fourth side of the Quad is bordered by the Squeri Hall, which houses Smith Auditorium (used to host receptions, speakers, and performances) on the first floor and the Chapel of De La Salle and His Brothers on the second floor, which features a painting of De La Salle and Brothers behind the altar, a large performing area where musical events and concerts take place on the altar, a grand piano, and a pipe organ in the balcony.

Thomas Hall, one of the institution's student life buildings, houses the offices of the dean of students, the student government, the musical ensembles, and others. Two of the institution's dining halls, Locke's Loft and Cafe 1853 are also located in Thomas Hall.

Kelly Commons, named after notable alumnus Raymond Kelly, is another student life building that was completed in 2014. It holds a Starbucks, a Marketplace, multiple different dining options, a state-of-the-art gym for student and faculty use, the Multicultural Center, halls for lectures and events, the student bookstore and the office for the student-run newspaper, The Quadrangle.

The O'Malley Library is a six-story structure that was joined with the previous library, the Cardinal Hayes Pavilion. Built on a hill, the new library was built directly next to and above the old one, essentially combining the two and creating more floors, while enhancing technology and adding group study spaces. The Office of Admissions is on the sixth floor of O'Malley.

Hayden Hall is on the east side of campus and houses the Kakos School of Science as well as the department of fine arts. The Kakos Center for Scientific Computing may also be found here, which contains a cluster of high performance workstations used for a wide variety of scientific and economic projects.

On the South campus, across 240th street, is the Higgins '62 Engineering and Science Center, which is connected to Leo Hall and the Research and Learning Center (RLC). The buildings are home to all of the engineering departments: electrical, computer, civil, chemical, mechanical, and environmental, along with the math and computer science departments and all communication classrooms, computer labs, and broadcasting studios. Laboratories and classes for these disciplines take place in both buildings. Both biology and chemistry laboratories are also located on the south campus. This building once contained a working nuclear reactor, which was decommissioned and stripped of its nuclear fuel and power generating capabilities in 1999.

In September 2021, the Leo Engineering Building was refurbished with a new 30,000 square foot building with 14 engineering and science labs. The new laboratory building is named the Higgins Engineering & Science Center, thanks to a $5 million gift from Cornelius Higgins (Class of 1962) and his wife, Patricia.

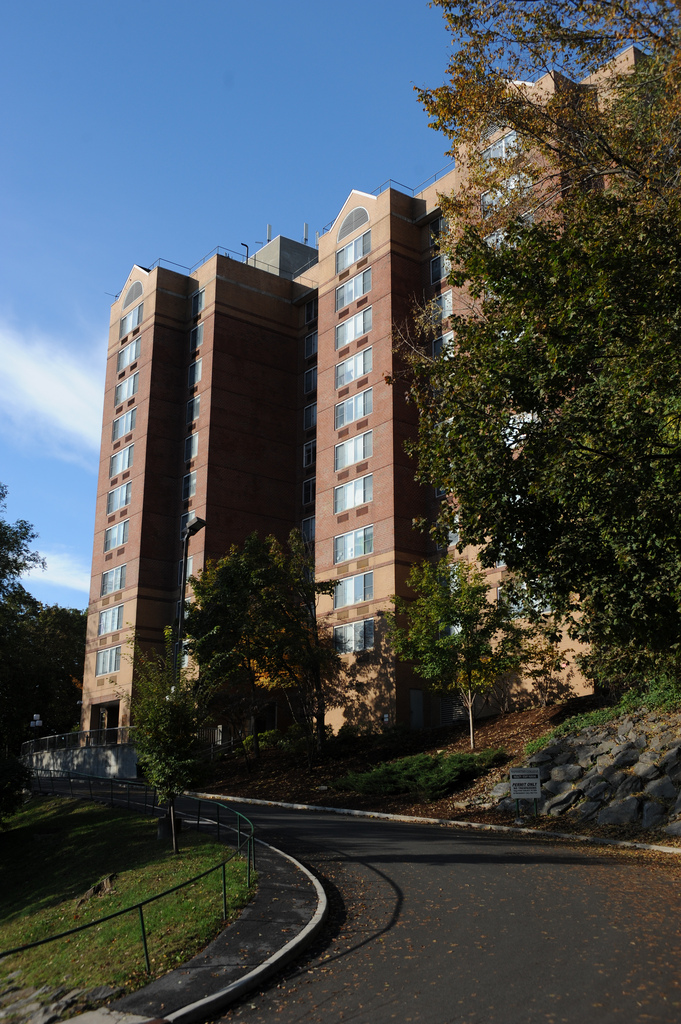
Horan Hall

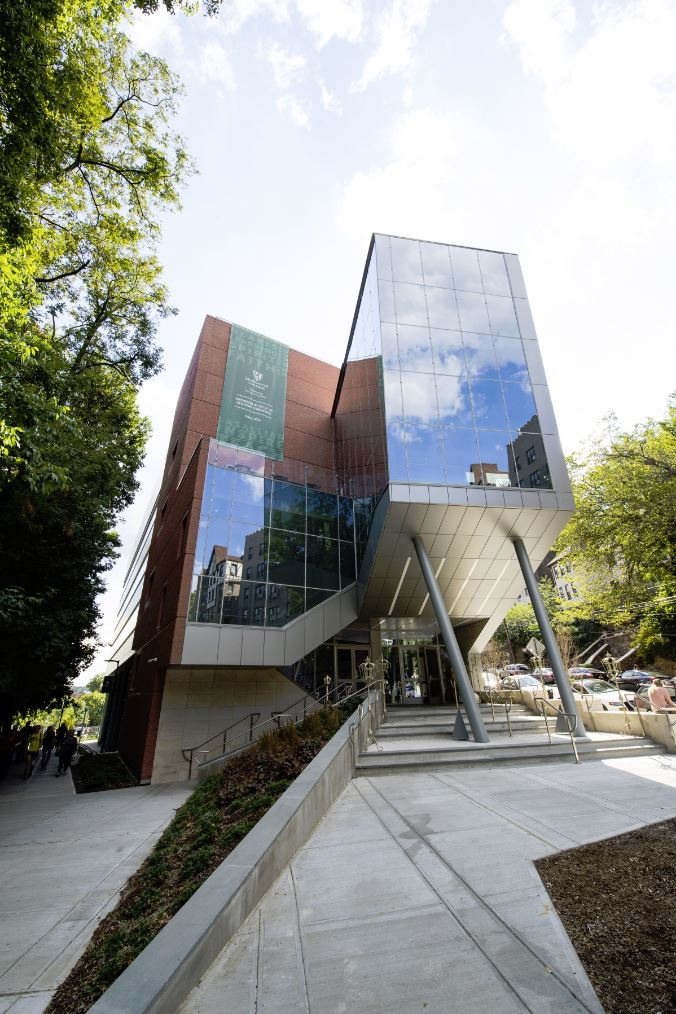
Kelly Student Commons

There are currently four on-campus residence halls at Manhattan University. Jasper Hall and Chrysostom Hall are both traditional-style dorms, while Horan Hall and Lee Hall offer suite-style living and apartment-style living.

Draddy Gymnasium is the home of the basketball and volleyball teams, and also features the largest indoor track in New York City. Gaelic Park, on 240th Street, has recently been renovated with an artificial turf and is where soccer, lacrosse, and softball teams play. The institution also utilizes adjacent Van Cortlandt Park for outdoor track and field, golf, and cross country as well as intramural activities. Alumni Hall is the home of the institution's workout facilities as well as the athletic administration.

The Broadway Garage is a five floor parking garage, approved in 2006 and completed soon afterward, located on Broadway. The garage offers parking to students and faculty, as well as visitors. The garage is also connected to Hayden hall via a pedestrian bridge that connects to one of Hayden's top floors, allowing pedestrians to bypass crossing Manhattan College Parkway.

== Academics ==
Manhattan University offers degrees in three undergraduate schools: the Kakos School of Arts and Sciences, the O'Malley School of Business, and the School of Engineering. Its most popular undergraduate majors, based on 2021 graduates, were:

Civil Engineering (89)
Mechanical Engineering (73)
Marketing (47)
Communication (44)
Finance (38)
Psychology (37)

Classes operate on a semester schedule. The first semester begins in late August and runs to December. The second semester begins in mid-January and runs to mid-May. Winter intersession and summer courses are also offered, but not required.

The institution offers a number of pre-professional programs such as pre-dental, pre-law, pre-medical, pre-physical therapy, and pre-veterinary; and graduate programs in computer science, education, engineering, business, and counseling. The graduate School of Engineering allows students studying engineering as an undergraduate the opportunity to continue on to get their master's degree without having to switch institutions, as is the case at colleges with a 3 + 2 engineering program. The B.S. Business / Masters of Business Administration Program offers students an option to complete a five-year multiple award program. The successful completion of the five-year program leads to two awards: a B.S. in business (in one of six majors) and an MBA.

Manhattan University contains chapters of numerous honor societies, including Phi Beta Kappa, Sigma Xi, Tau Beta Pi, Pi Mu Epsilon, and Lambda Pi Eta. Manhattan participates in the Consortium of Liberal Arts Colleges.

Academic rankings

Master's
- Washington Monthly: 16

Regional
- U.S. News & World Report: 22

National
- Forbes: 173
- WSJ/College Pulse: 266

=== Rankings ===
In 2019, Money magazine ranked Manhattan as the top "transformative" school in the nation in a study that took into account earnings and graduation rates to determine which schools help students succeed professionally. Manhattan was ranked 78th out of 1,879 schools in return on investment according to PayScale's 2018 rankings. A 2015 Brookings Institution study ranked it as the ninth best school in the country when comparing expected versus actual mid-career earnings. Forbes ranked Manhattan 173rd out of the top 500 rated private and public colleges and universities in America for the 2024–25 report. Manhattan was also ranked 98th among private colleges and 70th in the northeast.

== Leadership ==
Manhattan University is led by a president. As of August 2025, the president is Frederick Bonato.

Name	Dates
1. Br. Patrick	1861–1873
2. Br. Paulian	1873–1879
3. Br. Anthony	1879–1886
4. Br. Justin	1886–1893
5. John J. Kelly (Br. Elzear Stephen)	1893–1895
6. Br. Aelred	1896–1899
7. Br. Charles	1900–1902
8. Br. Jerome	1902–1904
9. Br. Arnold Edward	1904–1907
10. Br. Peter	1907–1909
11. Br. Jerome (2nd term)	1909–1912
12. Br. Arnold Edward (2nd term)	1912–1918
13. Br. Apelles Jasper	1918–1921
14. Cantidius Thomas Fitzsimmons	1921–1927
15. Martin Joseph Hession (Br. Cornelius Malachy)	1927–1932
16. Adelphus Patrick	1932–1938
17. Alexis Victor Lally	1938–1944
18. Bonaventure Thomas McGinty	1944–1953
19. Augustine Phillip Nelan	1953–1962
20. Gregory W. Nugent	1962–1975
21. J. Stephen Sullivan	1975–1987
22. Thomas J. Scanlan	1987–2009
23. Brennan O'Donnell	2009–2022
24. Daniel Gardner	2022–2023
25. Milo Riverso	2023–2024
26. Frederick Bonato	2024–present

== Athletics ==
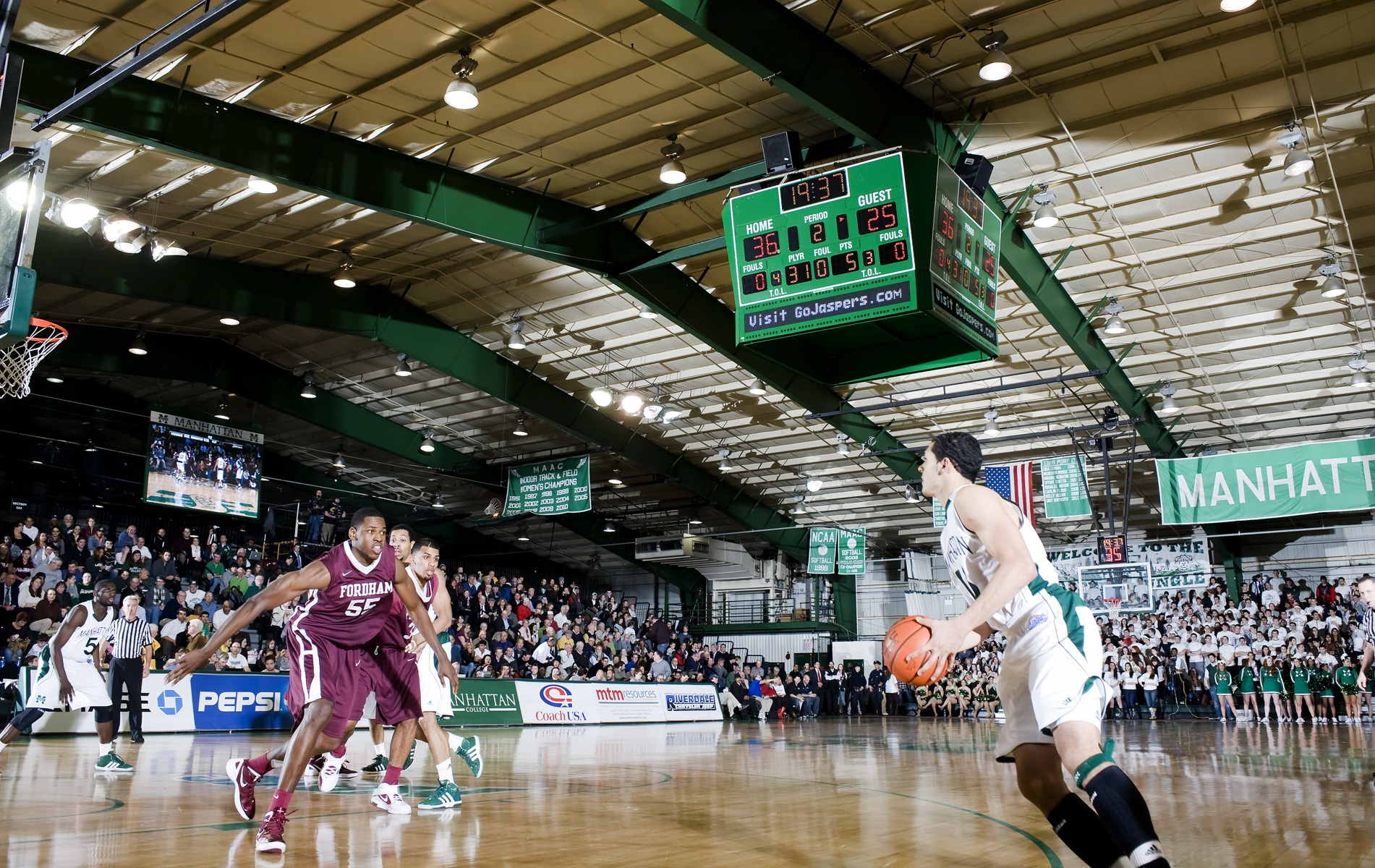
Manhattan versus rival Fordham University during the annual Battle of the Bronx

Manhattan University fields 19 Division–I athletic teams for men and women, including basketball, golf, soccer, baseball and softball, lacrosse, volleyball, and rowing. The school's men's sports teams are called the Jaspers; women's teams are known as the Lady Jaspers. Historically track and field has been the school's strongest sport. Manhattan is a member of the Metro Atlantic Athletic Conference (MAAC).

In the modern era, basketball is the most popular sport at the institution. The current coach is John Gallagher who was named head coach in March 2023. Fran Fraschilla was head coach of the Jaspers from 1992 to 1996, and his teams had an 85–35 record, a 71% won-lost percentage, and won two MAAC titles and the 1993 MAAC men's basketball tournament championship. In 1995 the Jaspers became the first Jaspers team in 35 years to compete in the NCAA Basketball Tournament and the first team from the MAAC to obtain an at-large bid to the NCAA Tournament. There they defeated the fourth-seeded Oklahoma Sooners in the first round, before losing in the second round to the Arizona State Sun Devils. Fraschilla was named the 1994–95 MAAC Men's Basketball Coach of the Year, after the team's 26-5 season.

The Manhattan University Track and Field program is the richest athletic tradition at the institution, amassing a total of 31 out of a possible 32 MAAC Indoor/Outdoor Track titles. In 1973, Manhattan University won the Indoor NCAA Championship along with setting a new world record in the distance medley relay. Manhattan was also home to former American record holder in the 5,000m Matthew Centrowitz Sr. The Program was run by coach/runner Fred Dwyer who ran an astounding 4:00.8 mile while at Villanova University. Manhattan still remains a power house on the east coast, under the direction of Dan Mecca.

The college annually played the New York Giants in the late 1880s and into the 1890s at the Polo Grounds and Manhattan is credited by the Baseball Hall of Fame with the practice of the "seventh inning stretch" spreading from there into major league baseball. It is written in the Baseball Hall of Fame that "During one particularly warm and humid day when Manhattan College was playing a semi-pro baseball team called the Metropolitans, Brother Jasper noticed the Manhattan students were becoming restless and edgy as Manhattan came to bat in the seventh inning of a close game. To relieve the tension, Brother Jasper called time-out and told the students to stand up and stretch for a few minutes until the game resumed."

Luis Castro, a Manhattan University alumnus, was the first Latin American-born player to play in Major League Baseball in the United States.

Manhattan University had a football program from 1924 until 1942. The team posted an all-time record of 194 wins, 198 losses and 22 ties. The final coach for the football team was Herbert M. Kopf. After the 1942 season, the school suspended intercollegiate football competition for World War II and then did not reactivate the program after completion of the war. The team was invited to the first ever Miami Palm Festival Game, predecessor to the Orange Bowl, played on January 2, 1933, University of Miami defeated Manhattan University, 7–0. The team was revived in 1965 in the form of a club team, and existed until 1987.

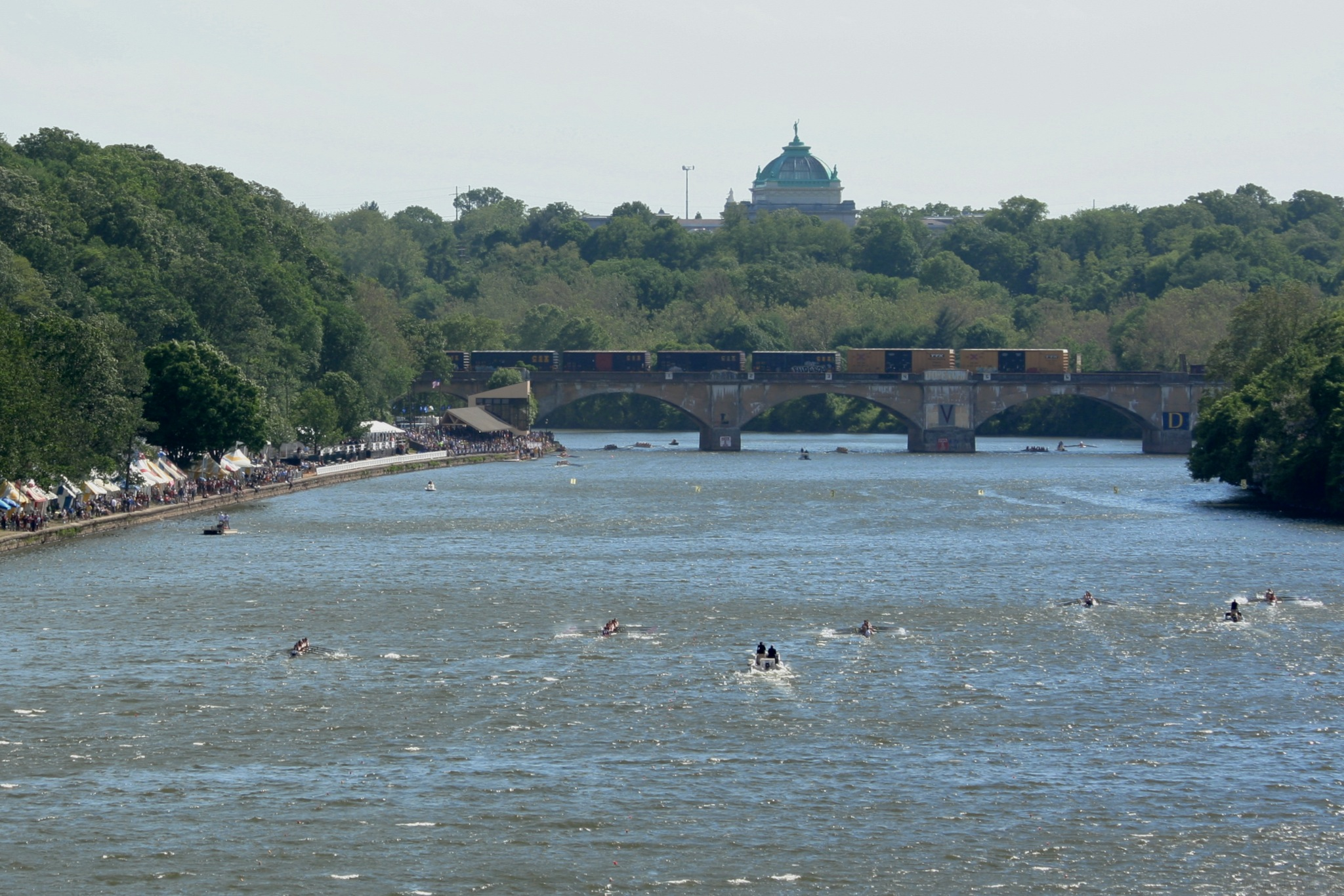
The Aberdeen Dad Vail Regatta, 2010

Manhattan University's rowing program holds much history, as well. It is one of the original 8 founding members of the Aberdeen Dad Vail Regatta, the largest collegiate regatta in the United States. The race attracts over 100 colleges and universities from the U.S. and Canada and thousands of student-athletes on the second Saturday of May. The team's coach, Allen Walz, along with the football coach at the time, Herbert M. Kopf, served as stewards to the regatta. In 1936 and 1938, Manhattan was one of two teams competing in the regatta, the other being Rutgers, on the Harlem River. Both the men's and women's teams still compete in the Dad Vail Regatta today, as well as in the MAAC Championships, N.Y. State Championships, and Knecht Cup. The women's team became Division I in 2015, while the men's team has remained at the club level. The women's team currently trains out of Overpeck County Park under Head Coach Alex Canale while the men's team has moved to Glen Island Park under Head Coach Kate Hickes. The women's rowing team won the Fall Metropolitan Championship (hosted by Iona College) in the fall of 2018 and the Spring Metropolitan Championship in the spring of 2019, making it the first time in program history that the Jaspers had won either of those titles.

Manhattan's men's lacrosse program became Division I in 1997. They have qualified for the MAAC tournament 7 times (2000, 2002, 2004, 2005 and 2008–2010). In 2002, the Jaspers went undefeated in the MAAC (9–0) and won the MAAC Championship. They finished with an 11–6 record. The Jaspers earned a bid to the NCAA Playoffs in 2002, playing Georgetown. They fell to Georgetown 12–7 in the first round of the NCAAs. They have produced many All-MAAC players throughout the 15 years of the program.

The fencing team has been coached by former two-time Olympian Herb Cohen.

== Performing arts ==
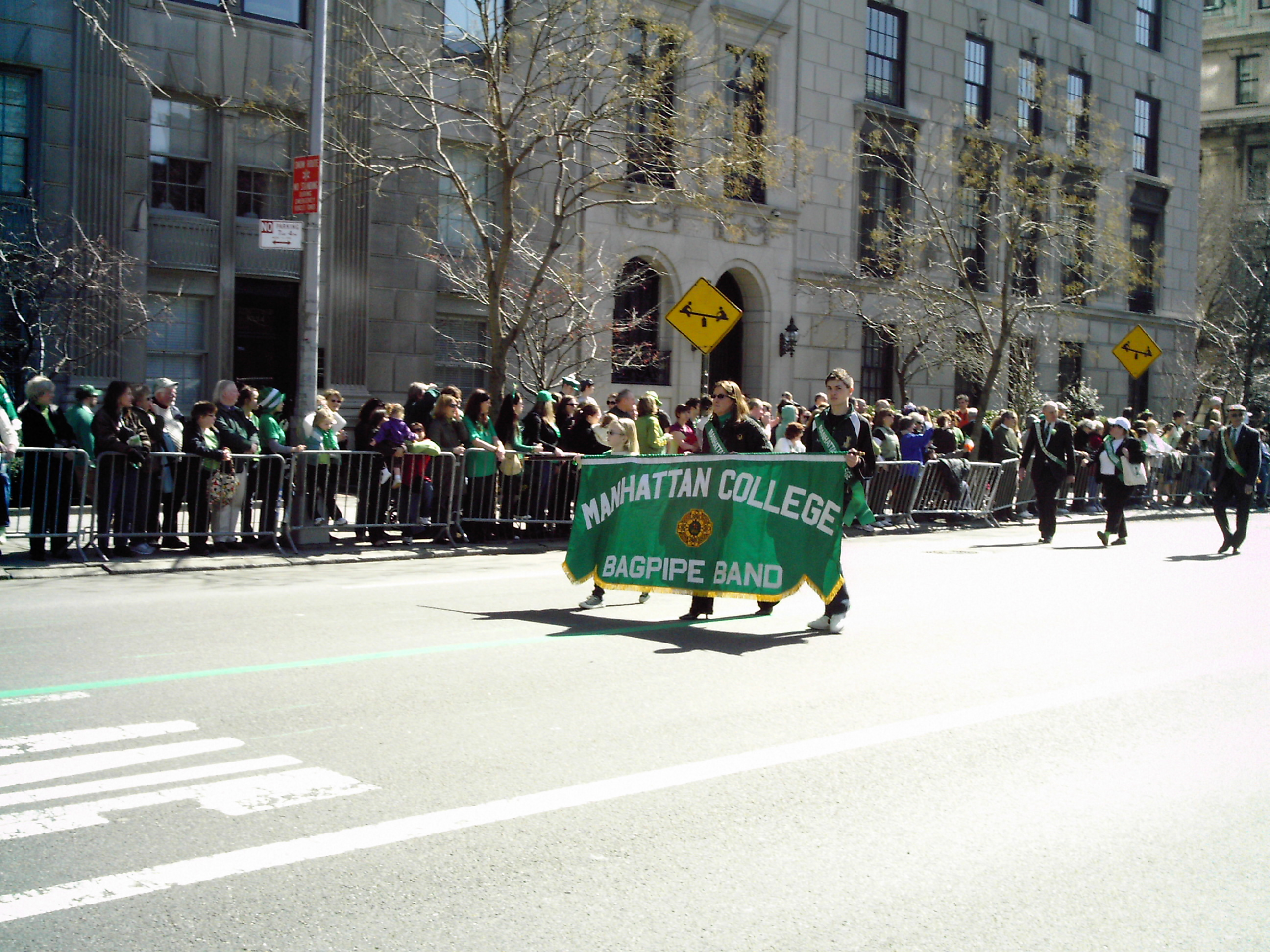
Pipe Band on Fifth Avenue

=== Manhattan University Pipes & Drums ===
Manhattan University Pipes & Drums was established in 1981 by Brother Kenneth Fitzgerald, FSC with the musical assistance of Captain Robert Hogan, of the New York City Police Department Emerald Society Pipes & Drums. The band's members are students, faculty, and alumni of the college.

The band marches in many local parades including the famed New York City Saint Patrick's Day Parade.

=== Pep Band ===
Also known as the JasperBand, the Manhattan University Pep Band provides musical inspiration to get the Jasper crowds going at Men's and Women's basketball games. The Pep Band travels with teams to important away games to provide support away from home as well. In addition to performances at sporting events, the band also performs in concerts and events such as the MAAC Band Jam prior to the MAAC Basketball tournament. The band performs a variety of music from an expansive repertoire, ranging from Seven Nation Army by The White Stripes and You Can Call Me Al by Paul Simon, to modern day hits such as High Hopes by Panic! at the Disco and Mo Bamba by Sheck Wes. From 2016 to 2024, the band was directed by New York City drummer Jake Robinson.

=== Ensembles ===
Manhattan University has eight recognized performing arts groups. In addition to the aforementioned Manhattan University Pipes & Drums and Pep Band, they have a Jazz Band, a choir called Singers, a theater club called Players, an improv troupe called Scatterbomb, an Orchestra and an a cappella group called Manhattones.

== Student newspaper ==
The Quadrangle (or The Quad) is the student newspaper of Manhattan University. The Quadrangle publishes weekly on Tuesdays during the academic year. It is editorially independent of the college's administration. The Quadrangle has continually published since its founding in 1924, when Manhattan University moved to its current location in Riverdale. The Quadrangle is an official club of Manhattan University and is open to students of all academic fields of study.

== Transportation ==
The institution is located between two major New York City highways, the Henry Hudson Parkway and the Major Deegan Expressway. The Van Cortlandt Park–242nd Street station on the New York City Subway's 1 train is located nearby, while the Riverdale station on the Metro-North Railroad's Hudson Line is located farther west.

== Alumni ==
Manhattan has approximately 50,000 living alumni worldwide. Manhattan alumni have distinguished themselves in the fields of academics, arts, engineering, literature, business, entertainment, government, and law.

- In the field of academia, Manhattan graduates include: Joseph A. Alutto, executive vice president and provost of the Ohio State University; L. Jay Oliva, 14th President of New York University; Henry Petroski, professor of civil engineering at Duke University.
- In arts and literature, Manhattan graduates include: William Edmund Barrett, author of The Left Hand of God and Lilies of the Field; James Patterson, Edgar Award-winning novelist; Al Sarrantonio, Bram Stoker Award-winning author; George A. Sheehan, author of Running & Being: The Total Experience; and Sebastian Castillo, author of Fresh, Green Life.
- In the field of business, Manhattan graduates include Sam Belnavis, former NASCAR owner; Vincent dePaul Draddy, football player who introduced Izod and Lacoste brands; John M. Fahey, president and CEO of the National Geographic Society; Frank M. Folsom, former president of RCA Victor; John Horan '40, former chairman & CEO of Merck & Co.; Lynn Martin, 68th president of the New York Stock Exchange; Eugene R. McGrath, former chairman and CEO of Con Edison; Eileen Murray, co-CEO of Bridgewater Associates; Joseph M. Tucci, chairman, president and CEO of the EMC Corporation and Stephen J. Squeri, chairman and CEO of American Express, John Mulhearn ‘48, Chairman and CEO of AT&T.
- In entertainment, Manhattan graduates include: Frank Campanella, TV and motion picture actor on Captain Video; Joseph Campanella, TV, stage, and motion picture actor on Mannix; Alexandra Chando, TV actress known for role as Maddie on As The World Turns; Dennis Day, TV and radio personality on The Jack Benny Program; Barnard Hughes, Emmy and Tony Award-winning actor on Hugh Leonard's Da; Mike Mazurki, professional wrestler and character actor; Hugo Montenegro, TV and movie soundtrack composer known for theme song for I Dream of Jeannie and The Outcasts; and Glenn Hughes, founding member of The Village People.
- In law and government, Manhattan graduates include: John S. Martin, former U.S. Attorney and U.S. District Judge for the Southern District of New York; Hugh J. Grant, 91st Mayor of New York City; Rudy Giuliani, 107th Mayor of New York City; Raymond W. Kelly, New York City Police Commissioner; Mike Lawler, member of Congress representing New York's 17th congressional district; Chang Myon, 2nd and 7th Prime Minister of South Korea; and U.S. Representatives from New York: Mike Lawler, John J. Boylan, John J. Delaney, John J. Fitzgerald, Ambassador Thomas E. McNamara, Bill Owens, Angelo D. Roncallo, Thomas Francis Smith, Andrew Lawrence Somers, and James J. Walsh.
- Other notable Manhattan graduates include: James W. Cooley, mathematician, co-author of the fast Fourier transform algorithm used in digital processing; Austin Dowling, archbishop of the Roman Catholic Archdiocese of Saint Paul and Minneapolis; Patrick Joseph Hayes, Cardinal Archbishop of New York; George Mundelein, Cardinal Archbishop of Chicago; Olympic track gold medalists Lindy Remigino and Lou Jones.
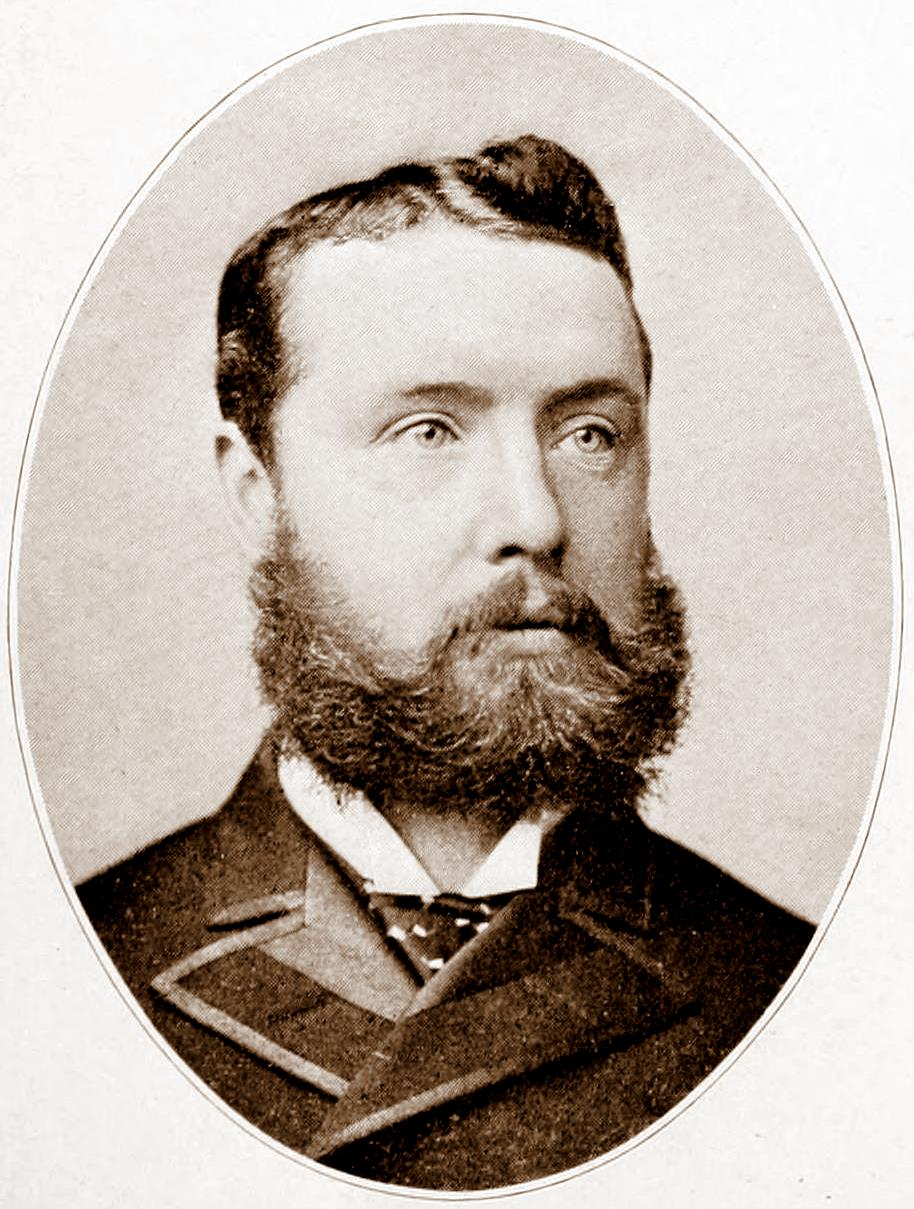
Hugh J. Grant,
91st Mayor of New York City

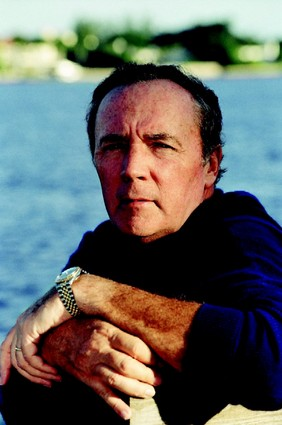
James Patterson,
Author

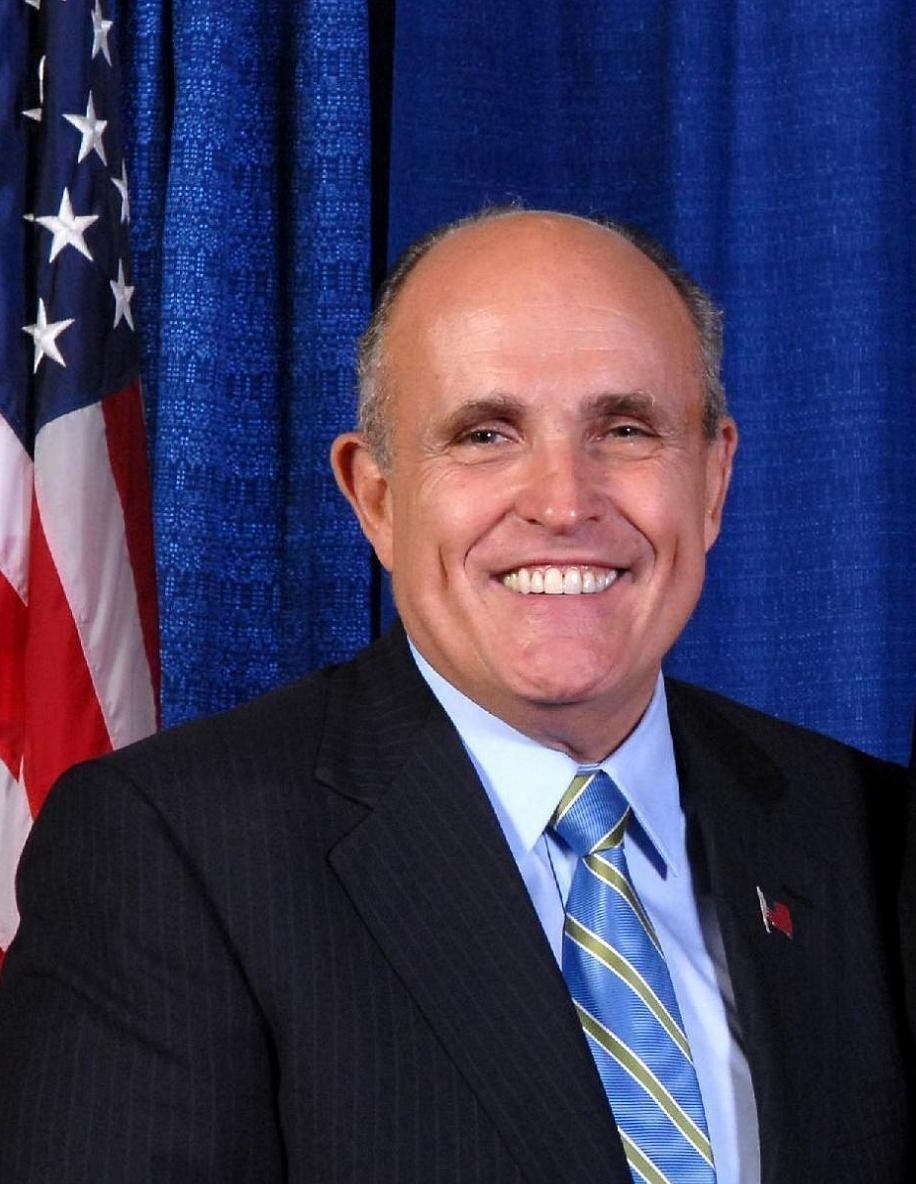
Rudy Giuliani,
107th Mayor of New York City

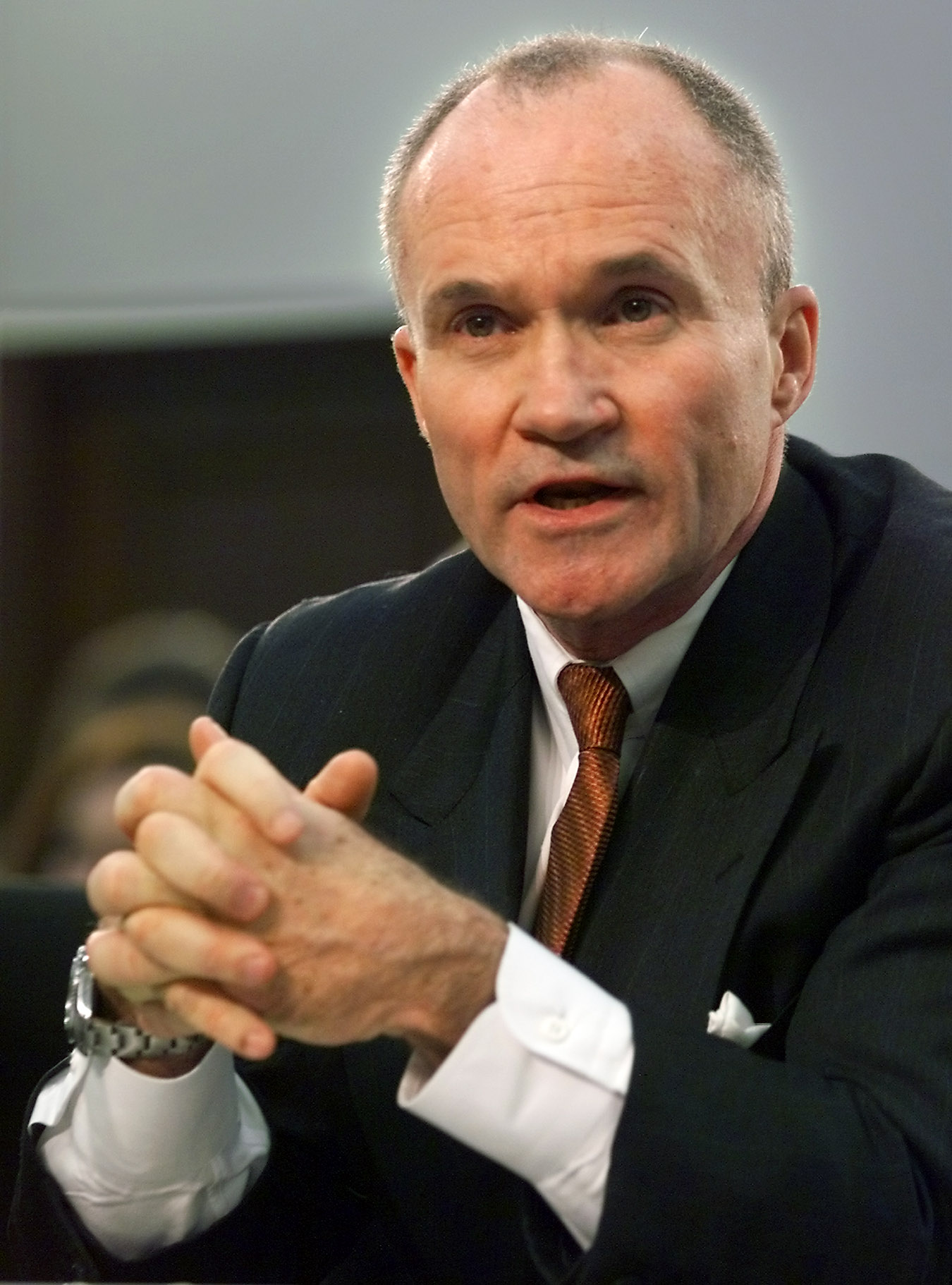
Raymond Kelly,
New York City Police Commissioner

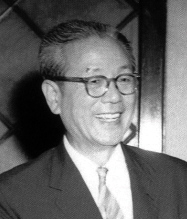
Chang Myon,
Prime Minister, Vice President of South Korea
