= New York City St. Patrick's Day Parade =

Annual parade in New York City

NYC St. Patrick’s Day Parade
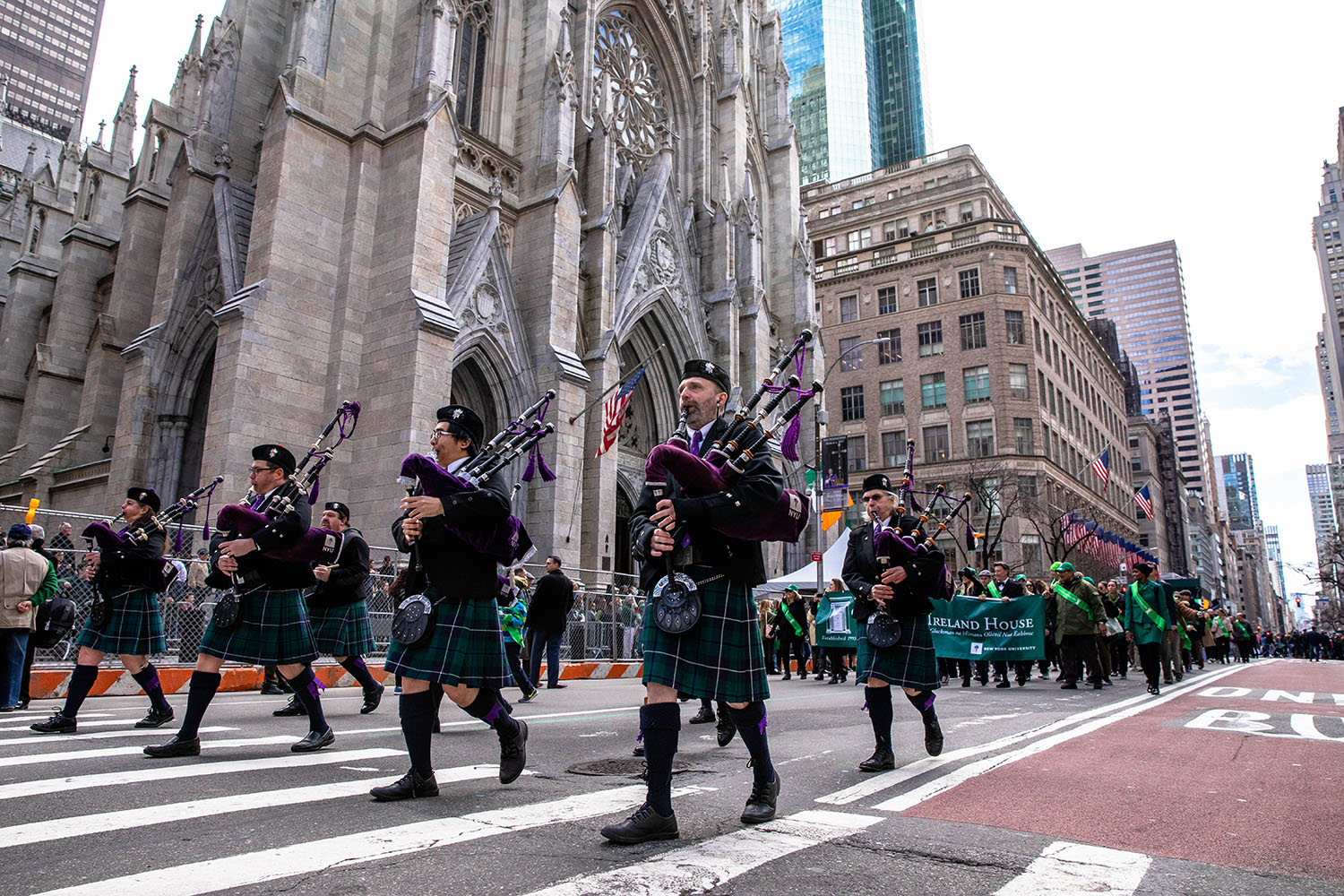
- Glucksman Ireland House NYU and NYU Pipes and Drums march in the 2019 NYC St. Patrick's Day Parade
- Status: Active
- Genre: Parade
- Date: 17th March
- Frequency: Annual
- Location: New York City, New York
- Country: United States
- Years active: 264
- Inaugurated: March 17, 1762
- Most recent: March 17, 2026
- Next event: March 17, 2027
- Participants: 150,000
- Attendance: 2,000,000
- Patrons: St. Patrick, Patron Saint of Ireland.
- Organiser: St. Patrick’s Day Parade, Inc
- Filing status: 501(c)(3) non-profit organization
- People: Sean Lane (Chairman), Ryan Hanlon (Vice Chairman), Brendan Benn (Vice Chairman), and Tommy Smyth (President).
- Sponsor: Saint Patrick's Day Foundation, NYC
- Website: www.nycstpatricksparade.org

The New York City St. Patrick's Day Parade is an annual parade organized by the Irish Community of New York City to honor Saint Patrick, the Patron Saint of Ireland while celebrating their Irish culture and heritage.

The parade is composed of thousands of participants from the many Irish cultural organizations and affiliated institutions across New York City, who each march under the banners of their respective groups.

The parade is led each year by a Grand Marshal, and features representation from across the uniformed services in New York City, which each have a significant affinity to the Irish community in New York.

These include the 69th New York Infantry Regiment, New York Police Department, Fire Department of the City of New York, New York Correction Department, New York Sanitation Department and New York State Department of Corrections.

The parade also features participants from across the city's political establishment, with the city's Mayors and City Councilors regularly marching in the parade.

The parade has also regularly attracted participants from national politics across both the United States and Ireland.

The parade has a record of 262 years of consistent marching. This was disrupted during the COVID-19 pandemic, though significantly smaller marches took place in 2020 and 2021. The full parade returned to its original format in 2022.

The most recent was on St Patrick's Day, March 17, 2026.

== Affiliated groups and other regular participants ==
The following list of affiliated groups and participants was taken from the 2022 Line of March, which features the 145 groups marching in the 2022 parade.

Participant	Type	Notes
69th New York Infantry Regiment	Uniformed Service	
James Connolly, Irish American Labor Coalition	Affinity Group	
Glucksman Ireland House NYU	Affinity Group	
NYU Pipes and Drums	Marching Band	
NYPD Emerald Society	Uniformed Service Emerald Society	organized March 16, 1953
NYCD Emerald Society	Uniformed Service Emerald Society	organized November 17, 1955
FDNY Emerald Society	Uniformed Service Emerald Society	organized March 17, 1956
Grand Council of United Emerald Societies	Umbrella group Emerald Societies	reorganized in 1975
The Emerald Guild Society of Building Managers	Fraternal Society	
Ancient Order of Hibernians	Fraternal Society	Each AOH division in the city marches under its own banner.
Emerald Society NYS Corrections	Uniformed Service Emerald Society	
County Societies / Associations	n/a	Irish-Americans from each of the 32 counties of Ireland are represented by an association which marches under its own banner.
Ladies Ancient Order of Hibernians, Inc.	Fraternal Society	
Glor na nGael Pipes and Drums	Marching Band	
NYS Courts Emerald Society	Public Service Emerald Society	
Plumbers and Steamfitters Local 21	Labor Union	
Irish Business Organization of New York Inc	Business Network	
NYC Carpenters Pipe and Drum Band	Marching Band	
Council of Gaelic Societies	Cultural Group	

== Grand marshals ==
A Grand Marshal of the parade is appointed each year, with the honored individual often a prominent Irish-American or someone who has contributed significantly to Irish-American affairs.

Grand Marshal	Year	Description
Robert J. McCann	2026	Co-Chairman NewEdge Capital Group.
Michael A. Benn	2025	President and Chairman of the Queens County St. Patrick's Day Parade
Margaret C. Timoney	2024	President and CEO of Heineken USA
Kevin Conway	2023	Finance executive
James Callahan	2020-22	General President of the International Union of Operating Engineers.
Brian O'Dwyer	2019	Former Commissioner of the United States National Commission.
Loretta Brennan Glucksman	2018	Chairman of The American Ireland Fund.
Michael J. Dowling	2017	CEO of Northwell Health.
Senator George J. Mitchell	2016	Former U.S. Senate Majority Leader and United States Special Envoy for Northern Ireland.
Cardinal Timothy Dolan	2015	Archbishop of New York.
Dorothy Cudahy	1989	Radio Presenter (First woman Grand Marshal)

== Organization ==
The parade is coordinated via a non-profit organisation, The St Patrick’s Day Parade Inc., which is a registered charity in New York. The charity is overseen by a board of directors which, as of 2025, included Sean Lane (Chairman), Ryan Hanlon (Vice Chairman), Brendan Benn (Vice Chairman), Thomas Smyth (President), and Danny Dromm (CFO).

=== LGBT participation controversy ===
In 1990, New York’s Irish Lesbian and Gay Organization (ILGO) submitted a request to participate in the following year's parade. The Ancient Order of Hibernians (AOH), responsible for organizing the parade, rejected the request, asserting there was insufficient space. Mayor David N. Dinkins successfully negotiated to allow for the inclusion of the ILGO, partly by agreeing to join the group in the parade himself. During the parade, members of the crowd frequently booed, shouted homophobic slurs, and threw beer cans at Dinkins and the group. The organizers banned ILGO from joining the 1992 parade and Dinkins boycotted the parade in response, the first time a mayor had not attended the parade since 1923.

The New York City Human Rights Commission required the parade to include ILGO in the following year's parade, insisting the parade was public and secular, despite the protests of the AOH to the contrary. In 1993, New York City issued a parade permit to a competing group, the St. Patrick’s Day Parade Committee, with a more liberal organization. The AOH, and several other prominent Irish organizations threatened to boycott the parade, and shortly before the parade, Federal District Court Judge Kevin Duffy ruled that the Human Right's Commission's ruling had been unconstitutional. As a result, ILGO did not participate in the 1993 parade. A similar case, Hurley v. Irish-American Gay, Lesbian, and Bisexual Group of Boston was brought to the US Supreme Court, which decided in 1995 that privately-organized could exclude groups even if the parade was public.

ILGO and other groups continued to protest the parade and in 2000, an inclusive "St. Pat’s For All" parade was organized. New York politician Christine Quinn criticized the continued exclusion of LGBT groups from the Fifth Avenue parade and Irish President Mary McAleese's refusal to serve as Grand Marshall was "widely believed" to be related. Mayor Bill de Blasio boycotted the Fifth Avenue parade in 2014 on the same grounds, joining "St. Pat’s For All" instead. Guinness withdrew its sponsorship of the Fifth Avenue parade the same year, and NBC threatened to stop broadcasting the parade until a LGBT group was included. As a result, a group of gay NBC employees was granted permission to join the 2015 parade and Guinness resumed its sponsorship. In 2016, the Irish gay rights group "Lavender & Green Alliance" was invited to participate in the Fifth Avenue parade.

== See also ==
- Irish culture in the United States
