= James Callahan (unionist) =

American labor union leader

James T. Callahan is an American labor union leader.

Callahan became an operating engineer in New York City in 1980, and joined the International Union of Operating Engineers (IUOE). He worked as a foreman on the clean-up team following the 1993 World Trade Center bombing, and responded immediately to the September 11 attacks on the building, working throughout the recovery efforts. He held various roles in his local union, becoming business manager and president in 2003.

Callahan was elected as a vice-president of the AFL-CIO in 2012. He was appointed as president of the IUOE the same year, winning an election the following year, to hold the post on an ongoing basis. He was given the Labor Leader award by the Irish Echo in 2015. He also serves as president of the New York Friends of Ireland, and in 2020 was appointed as grand marshal of the New York City St. Patrick's Day Parade. The parade was canceled due to COVID-19, but he finally filled the post in 2022.

Callahan retired from IUOE in 2025 as part of a plea deal with the US Attorney for knowingly filing false annual reports with the United States Department of Labor. In his plea, Callahan admitted to improperly benefiting from kickbacks worth approximately $315,000 from an advertising firm which was retained and compensated by IUOE. Callahan was granted a "full and unconditional" pardon by President Donald Trump on May 27, 2025, shortly before his scheduled sentencing.

== See also ==
- List of people granted executive clemency in the second Trump presidency

Trade union offices
Preceded by Vincent Giblin	President of the International Union of Operating Engineers; 2012–2025	Succeeded by John L. Downey
