= J. C. Turner =

American labor union leader

Member of the District of Columbia City Council
- In office November 3, 1967 – September 13, 1968
- Appointed by: Lyndon B. Johnson
- Preceded by: Position established
- Succeeded by: Phillip Daugherty

Personal details
- Born: James Castle Turner; November 4, 1916 Beaumont, Texas, U.S.
- Died: April 13, 1996 (aged 79) North Miami Beach, Florida, U.S.
- Party: Democratic
- Education: Catholic University (BA)

James Castle Turner (November 4, 1916 – April 13, 1996) was an American labor union leader.

Born in Beaumont, Texas, Turner moved to Washington, D.C., where he joined the International Union of Operating Engineers (IUOE) in 1934. Later in the decade, he studied economics at the Catholic University of America, where he was also a boxing champion. In 1940, he was elected as business manager of his local union, and from 1948 he held leading posts in the Maryland State Federation of Labor and the District of Columbia Federation of Labor. In these posts, he campaigned to integrate unions, and he also campaigned for home rule for the District of Columbia.

In 1956, Turner was elected as a vice-president of the IUOE. He became president of the Greater Washington Central Labor Council in 1958, and from 1965 to 1968 he was president of the Washington Building and Construction Trades Council. During the 1960s, he served on the Democratic National Committee, and in 1967, he was appointed to the first Council of the District of Columbia.

In 1972, he left his other posts to become secretary-treasurer of the IUOE, and then in 1976 he was elected as the union's president. From 1977, he also served as a vice-president of the AFL-CIO. During this period, he also served as Jimmy Carter's special representative to Peru. However, he was critical of Carter's anti-inflation program, which he argued would not succeed and unfairly penalized workers. He retired in 1985.

Trade union offices
Preceded by Hunter P. Wharton	President of the International Union of Operating Engineers; 1976–1985	Succeeded by Larry Dugan
Preceded by Hal C. Davis; George Hardy	AFL-CIO Delegate to the Trades Union Congress; 1977	Succeeded by Glenn Watts
