= Hal C. Davis =

American labor union leader (1914–1978)

Hal C. Davis (February 27, 1914 – January 11, 1978) was an American labor union leader.

Born in Pittsburgh, Davis was educated at Allegheny High School, then in 1930 became a percussionist working on the KDKA radio station. He later worked for WCAE, and in various theaters and nightclubs. During World War II, he served as a corporal in the United States Marine Corps.

Davis joined the American Federation of Musicians (AFM), and in 1949 was elected as president of his local union. In 1950, he was also elected as a vice-president of the Pennsylvania State Federation of Labor. He was elected as a vice-president of the AFM in 1963, and then in 1970 as president of the union. In 1974, he was additionally elected as president of the Inter-American Federation of Entertainment Workers, and in 1975 as a vice-president of the AFL-CIO. He was a member of the National Council of the Arts, and director of the Associated Council of the Arts. He died in 1978, while still in office.

Trade union offices
Preceded by Herman D. Kenin	President of the American Federation of Musicians; 1970–1978	Succeeded by Victor Fuentealba
Preceded by William Sidell; Sol Stetin	AFL-CIO delegate to the Trades Union Congress; 1976; With: George Hardy	Succeeded by J. C. Turner
