= Vincent Giblin (unionist) =

Vincent J. Giblin (1945 – October 15, 2018) was an American labor union leader.

Born in East Orange, New Jersey, he was the son of John J. Giblin. He became a stationery engineer in 1964, and joined the International Union of Operating Engineers. In 1975, he was elected as business manager of his local union. In 1989, he became an international vice-president of the union, and later won election as the union's secretary-treasurer. In 2005, he was elected as president of the union.

As leader of the union, Giblin founded the National Training Fund, focused on recruiting new members in the southern United States, and set up the Operating Engineers Charity Fund. He was additionally elected as a vice-president of the AFL-CIO. He retired in 2012, following which he was named in a class action lawsuit alleging corruption in the union, but the case was dismissed.

Trade union offices
Preceded by N. Budd Coutts	Secretary-Treasurer of the International Union of Operating Engineers; 2002–2005	Succeeded by Christopher Hanley
Preceded by Frank Hanley	President of the International Union of Operating Engineers; 2005–2012	Succeeded by James Callahan
