= John J. Horan =

American businessman (1920–2011)

- Born: July 9, 1920; Staten Island, New York
- Died: January 22, 2011 (aged 90); Princeton, New Jersey
- Education: Manhattan College (BA); Columbia Law School (JD)
- Occupations: Chairman and CEO of Merck & Co. (1976—1985)

John J. Horan (July 9, 1920 — January 22, 2011) was an American businessman. He was Chairman and CEO of Merck & Co. from 1976 to 1985.

== Early life and education ==
Horan was born on July 9, 1920, on Staten Island. He attended Manhattan College on a scholarship, graduating in 1940. He then served in the United States Navy during World War II in the North Africa and Italy theaters and worked in communications operation in Plymouth, England on the staff of Admiral John E. Wilkes. It was during his shift that General Dwight D. Eisenhower sent word to commence the D-Day operations and he was one of the first officers to deliver Eisenhower's orders to launch the amphibious landing.

After the war, Horan earned a J.D. degree from Columbia Law School in 1946.

== Career ==
He joined Merck in 1952 as part of its legal department and became spokesperson of its North Wales, Pennsylvania laboratory in 1957. He then rose through the ranks to become director of Research Administration, director of Corporate Planning, president and chief operating officer of Merck Sharp and Dohme.

From 1976 to 1985, Horan served as CEO and Chairman of Merck. It was under his leadership that Merck became the world’s largest drug maker and tripled the company’s research and development spending – more than any other pharmaceutical firm at that time. Under Horan, Merck introduced the hepatitis B vaccine, Ivermectin, as well as new antibiotics and drugs to treat high blood pressure and heart failure.

After retiring from Merck, he continues to serve as a director of the company and vice chairman until 1993. He also served as chairman of Myriad Genetics, Atrix Laboratories, and a director of Celgene Corporation following his retirement from Merck. His other corporate directorships included: General Motors Corporation, J.P. Morgan & Co., NCR Corporation, Burlington Industries. He was a chairman of the Pharmaceutical Research and Manufacturers of America. He was also active in civic organizations and was a trustee of The Robert Wood Johnson Foundation and United Negro College Fund.

== Recognition ==
Harvard Business School named him one of the "Great American Business Leaders of the 20th Century." Horan received an honorary degree from Manhattan College in 1978. He is the namesake of Horan Hall, a dormitory on the campus of Manhattan College. Merck Research Laboratories also dedicated an $80 million research building to Horan in Rahway, New Jersey.

== Death ==
Horan died at age 90 on January 22, 2011, in Princeton, New Jersey.
