= Frank Hanley (unionist) =

American labor union leader (born 1930)

Frank Xavier Hanley (born July 5, 1930) is a former American labor union leader.

Born in New York City, Hanley attended All Hallows High School, then became a heavy equipment operator and joined the International Union of Operating Engineers (IUOE). He spent time in the United States Marine Corps, including serving in the Korean War, then attended the University of Notre Dame. In 1958, he began working full-time for the IUOE, and completed the Harvard Trade Union Program. He served as the assistant to successive presidents of the international union, and then in 1975 won election as a vice-president.

Hanley was elected as secretary-treasurer of the IUOE in 1979, and then in 1990 as president of the union. That year, he was also elected as a vice-president of the AFL-CIO. As leader of the union, Hanley computerized its head office, extended its organizing efforts, and expended training programs to cover emerging trades. He retired in 2005.

Trade union offices
Preceded by Russell T. Conlon	Secretary-Treasurer of the International Union of Operating Engineers; 1979–1990	Succeeded by N. Budd Coutts
Preceded by Larry Dugan	President of the International Union of Operating Engineers; 1990–2005	Succeeded by Vincent Giblin
