= Hunter P. Wharton =

American labor union leader

Hunter Poisal Wharton (October 20, 1900 – November 14, 1980) was an American labor union leader.

Born in Martinsburg, West Virginia, Wharton was educated at the Carnegie Institute of Technology. He began working in Pittsburgh, and in 1926 joined the International Union of Operating Engineers (IUOE). In 1930, he was elected as business agent of his local union. He also served as president of the Pittsburgh Building and Construction Trades Council, and began working for the IUOE as an international representative.

In 1950, Wharton became the full-time assistant to the union's general president. In 1955, he was elected as a trustee of the union, and then in 1957 as a vice-president. In 1958, he was elected as secretary-treasurer of the IUOE, and then in 1962 as the union's president. His obituary in the New York Times described him as having a reputation for integrity, in a union which had previously been known for corruption.

From 1965, Wharton additionally served as a vice-president of the AFL-CIO, and on the federation's executive council. He chaired the federation's education committee, and also held leading posts in the National Safety Council. He played a leading role in getting the Occupational Health and Safety Act, 1970, passed. He promoted increased construction of housing, especially for elderly people, and worked to recruit more African Americans into the union.

Wharton retired in 1975, becoming president emeritus of the union. He served on the board of the National Council of Senior Citizens, and also served terms as president of the Fraternal Order of Eagles, and commander of the Knights of Malta.

Trade union offices
Preceded by Joseph J. Delaney	President of the International Union of Operating Engineers; 1962–1975	Succeeded by J. C. Turner
