= Victor Fuentealba =

American labor union leader (1922–2024)

Victor William Fuentealba

President of the American Federation of Musicians
- In office 1978–1987

Personal details
- Born: September 1, 1922 Baltimore, Maryland, U.S.
- Died: April 17, 2024 (aged 101) Baltimore, Maryland, U.S.
- Education: University of Maryland
- Occupation: Labour union leader, soldier
- Military career
- Branch: United States Army
- Units: 83rd Infantry; 84th Division
- Conflicts: World War II

Victor William Fuentealba (September 1, 1922 – April 17, 2024) was an American labor union leader.

== Biography ==
=== Early life and military service ===
Born in the Canton area of Baltimore, Maryland, Fuentealba attended Calvert Hall College High School and then Johns Hopkins University. In 1942, he joined the United States Army, serving during World War II with the 83rd Infantry Division and then the 84th Division. From 1944, he served in Europe, supporting medics in treating soldiers with combat fatigue. He was injured and captured by Nazi forces on April 14, 1945, but was freed less than a day later by advancing Allied forces. He used his knowledge of German to aid negotiations.

After being freed, Fuentealba was treated for his injuries in various hospitals, then in 1946 returned to Baltimore.

=== Labor union ===
Fuentealba studied at Loyola College and then the University of Maryland, qualifying as a lawyer in 1950. In addition, he played both saxophone and clarinet, and joined the American Federation of Musicians. He was elected as president of his local union in 1956. In 1967, he was elected to the union's international executive board, and then in 1970 as a vice-president of the union.

In 1978, Fuentealba was elected as the union's president. As leader of the union, he promoted live music and proposed a tax on blank recording media. Leaders of some of the union's locals became unhappy with an agreement Fuentealba negotiated with recording companies, and in 1987 he was defeated, in the union's first ever contested presidential election. He argued that unfair and illegal means had been used to influence conference delegates, and unsuccessfully called on the government to order a mail-in ballot of all union members.

=== Later life and death ===
Fuentealba was also prominent in the Veterans of Foreign Wars, having joined in 1946, and rising to serve a term as the organization's judge advocate general. He also served 15 years as Maryland's judge advocate, and on his 100th birthday was still commander of the organization's post 9083.

Fuentealba died after an extended illness at a hospice in Baltimore, on April 17, 2024, at the age of 101.

Trade union offices
Preceded by Hal C. Davis	President of the American Federation of Musicians; 1978–1987	Succeeded by Marty Emerson
