= Larry Dugan =

American labor union leader

Lawrence L. Dugan (1930 – September 13, 1998) was an American labor union leader.

Born in Phoenix, Arizona, Dugan became a crane oiler in 1948 and joined the International Union of Operating Engineers (IUOE), in which his father was already active. He served in various posts in his local union, including 25 years as its head. In 1979, he moved to Washington, D.C., to become a vice-president of the union, and the assistant to its president, J. C. Turner.

In 1985, Dugan was elected as president of the IUOE, succeeding Turner. This was a difficult period for the union, which lost members. Dugan focused on organization, and campaigned against "double breasting" - employers contracting non-union labor in parallel to union contracts. Dugan also served as a vice-president of the AFL-CIO. He retired in 1990, due to poor health, and died eight years later.

Trade union offices
Preceded by J. C. Turner	President of the International Union of Operating Engineers; 1985–1990	Succeeded by Frank Hanley
