= American Federation of Musicians =

North American trade union

- American Federation of Musicians of the United States and Canada
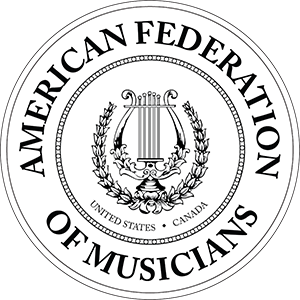
- Abbreviation: AFM
- Predecessor: National League of Musicians
- Formation: October 19, 1896; 130 years ago
- Type: Labor union
- Legal status: 501(c)(5) organization
- Headquarters: New York City, US
- Locations: Canada; United States
- Members: 66,672 (2023)
- President: Tino Gagliardi
- Affiliations: AFL–CIO; Canadian Labour Congress
- Website: afm.org

The American Federation of Musicians of the United States and Canada (AFM) is a 501(c)(5) labor union representing professional musicians in the United States and Canada. It negotiates fair agreements, protects ownership of recorded music, secures benefits such as healthcare and pension, and lobbies legislators. In Canada, the AFM is known as the Canadian Federation of Musicians/Fédération Canadienne des Musiciens (CFM/FCM). The organization publishes the monthly journal International Musician.

The AFM is affiliated with AFL-CIO (the largest federation of unions in the United States); the Department of Professional Employees; and the Canadian Labour Congress, the federation of unions in Canada.

The AFM has 162 affiliated locals across the United States and Canada that are organized into 11 geographic conferences: Canadian, Eastern, Illinois State, Mid-America, Mid-States, New England, New Jersey, California, Texas, Southern, and Western.

Six player conferences—International Conference of Symphony and Opera Musicians (ICSOM), Organization of Canadian Symphony Musicians (OCSOM), Regional Orchestra Players Association (ROPA), Recording Musicians Association (RMA), Theater Musicians Association (TMA), and Freelance Musicians Association (FMA) -- give voice to musicians in various industry sectors.

== Allied Organizations ==
The AFM maintains close ties with other arts and entertainment unions and trade organizations in the US, Canada, and around the world. These alliances allow for additional support and solidarity during contract negotiations. Among its union allies in North America are the International Alliance of Theatrical Stage Employees (IATSE), Teamsters, Writers Guild of America (WGA), Directors Guild of America (DGA), Screen Actors Guild-American Federation of Television and Radio Artists (SAG-AFTRA) and more.

Through solidarity with other unions representing workers in the film and television industry, the AFM was able to win progressive Basic Theatrical Motion Picture and Basic Television Motion Picture contracts with the Alliance of Motion Picture and Television Producers (AMPTP) in spring 2024. The AFM’s negotiations began shortly after resolution of the 2023 WGA and SAG-AFTRA strikes that interrupted film and television production. The AFM was a strong supporter of WGA, SAG-AFTRA, and other trade unions during their negotiations with AMPTP.

The AFM maintains close ties to international musician unions through its membership in the International Federation of Musicians (FIM). Current AFM president Tino Gagliardi serves as a vice president on the FIM Presidium. The AFM maintains a close ties with the Musicians’ Union in the United Kingdom.

The AFM is a member of the National Music Council of the United States and the musicFIRST Coalition.

== History ==
The roots of the musicians’ collective action began with the New York City-based Musical Mutual Protective Union in 1863, which took the first steps toward creating uniform scales for different types of musical employment in 1878. By March 1886, delegates from 15 different protective unions across the US came together to form the National League of Musicians to discuss and rectify common issues, such as competition from traveling musicians.

The American Federation of Labor recognized the American Federation of Musicians (AFM) in 1896. A group of delegates had broken away from the National League of Musicians in order to form a more egalitarian organization. Seeking to give meaning to the phrase "In unity there is strength", the first standing resolution of the AFM was: "That any musician who receives pay for his musical services, shall be considered a professional musician." However, the union was racially segregated.

The first convention, upon which the American Federation of Musicians was founded, was held October 1896 at the Hotel English in Indianapolis, Indiana. The group had 3,000 members and Owen Miller became the first AFM president. In 1896, Miller said: "The only object of AFM is to bring order out of chaos and to harmonize and bring together all the professional musicians of the country into one progressive body."

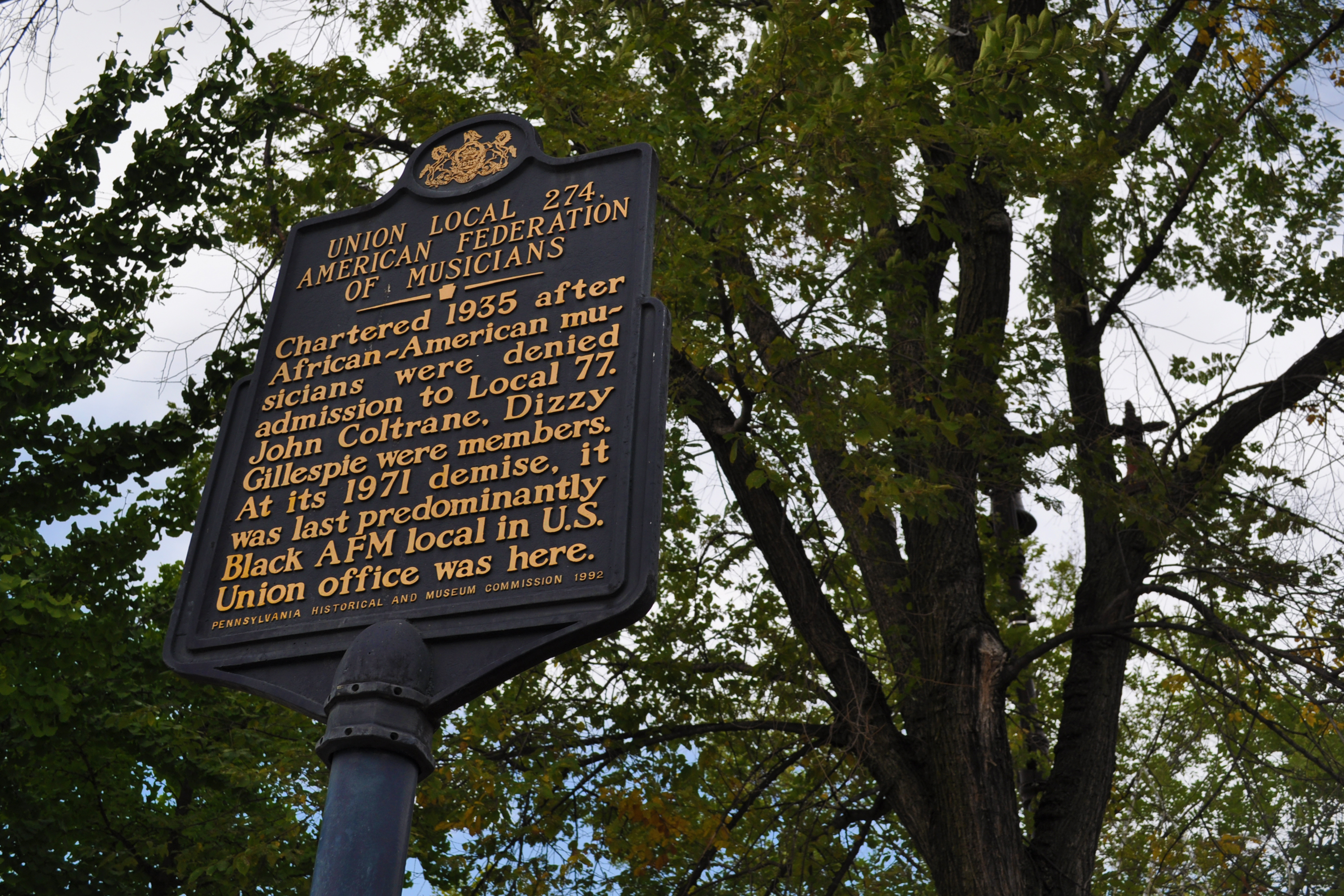
Union Local 274 historical marker, Philadelphia

At the same time, the trade-union movement was taking hold throughout North America. Unions representing all types of laborers were forming to exercise collective strength to raise wages, improve working conditions and secure greater dignity and respect for working people. In 1887, the AFL and the Knights of Labor first invited the National League of Musicians to affiliate with the trade-union movement, but the offers produced deep divisions within the National League of Musicians. Some members objected to musicians being called laborers, insisting instead that they were "artists and professionals." As the American music scene prospered and more symphony orchestras were founded, the need for a national organization for musicians increased.

In 1897, the union became international when the Montreal Musicians Protective Union and Toronto Orchestral Association joined.

=== 1900s expansion ===
By 1900, the union changed its name to the American Federation of Musicians of the United States and Canada and was actively organizing on both sides of the border. In 1902, the first Black local, Local 288, was chartered in Chicago.

A 1903 resolution was passed prohibiting foreign bands taking work from domestic bands. It was followed by a 1905 letter from the AFM petitioning president Theodore Roosevelt to protect American musicians by limiting the importation of musicians from outside Canada and the US.

By 1905, an official position on the International Executive Board was created to provide Canadian representation at the federation level, and second Black local Pittsburgh's Local 471, was chartered. Early accomplishments of the union included setting the first scales for orchestras traveling with comic operas, musical comedies and grand opera. Among the pressing issues was competition from both foreign musicians and off-duty military musicians.

In its first 10 years, the AFM had organized 424 locals and 45,000 musicians in the US and Canada. Virtually all instrumental musicians in the US were union members. In 1906, the 10-year-old organization made a donation of $1,000 to earthquake victims in San Francisco.

A 1908 appropriations bill banned armed-services musicians (exempting Marines) from competing with civilians. In 1916, Congress passed a law prohibiting all armed-services members from competing with civilians.

Cleveland's Black Local 550 was founded in 1910, Columbus' Black Local 589 in 1913, Springfield, Illinois' Black Local 675 in 1914, Boston's Black Local 535 in 1915, and Parkersburg, West Virginia's Black Local 185 in 1916.

During the World War I era, general unemployment affected musicians. Silent films displaced some forms of traditional entertainment, and with a declining economy and other factors, many musicians were laid off.

In 1918, Seattle's Local 458 was founded for the city's non-white musicians who were excluded from Seattle's white Local 76. In 1924 it was renamed Local 493. 493 mostly had Black musicians, but also included Mexicans, Hawaiians, Filipinos, and some white musicians. The local helped Black workers get jobs at music halls that Local 76 tried to keep white-only, and also created the Blue Note Clubhouse for jazz musicians.

By the 1940s, there were thirty-eight Black locals. In cities without a Black local, non-white musicians had been segregated in "subsidiary locals", and had no voting rights, until 1944 when they were abolished. Seattle's 493 and 76 locals merged in 1956 to try to decrease racial tensions over jobs.

Among the best known AFM actions was the 1942–44 musicians' strike, orchestrated to pressure record companies to agree to a better arrangement for paying royalties.

=== Technology and legislation ===
In 1918, two important legislative measures, Prohibition and a 20 percent cabaret tax to support the war effort, negatively impacted many musicians. Prohibition ended after 13 years, but the cabaret tax took its toll on the music industry for many years to come.

The Copyright Act of 1909 created the first compulsory mechanical license stipulating royalty payments be paid by the user of a composer's work, but the law excluded musicians.

In the 1920s, new technologies challenged live music for the first time. The advent of recording and radio forever changed the landscape of musician employment. At AFM conventions, the union decried the use of canned music and forbid orchestra leaders from advertising their orchestras free of charge on radio. By the end of the 1920s, many factors had reduced the number of recording companies. As the nation recovered from World War I, technology advanced and there was diversity in recording and producing music. In 1927, the first "talkie" motion picture was released and within two years, 20,000 musicians lost their jobs performing in theater pits for silent films. Minimum wage scales were created for vitaphone, movietone and phonograph recording work. In 1938, film companies signed their first contract with AFM at a time when musicians were losing income as phonograph records replaced radio orchestras and jukeboxes competed with live music in nightclubs.

The AFM founded the Music Defense League in 1930 to gain public support against canned music in movie theaters.

The AFM set higher scales for the recording work than for live work, negotiating the first industry-wide agreements in the labor movement. While musicians flocked to Los Angeles hoping for high-paying recording work, fewer than 200 new jobs were created by the technology.

To help musicians find fair pay and union jobs, the AFM created a booking-agent licensing policy in 1936, and in 1938, developed a similar program for licensing record companies.

While national scales were set for live musicians working on fledgling radio networks, some stations had already begun using recordings. The 1937 AFM convention mandated Weber to fight against the use of recorded music on radio. He called a meeting with representatives of radio, transcription and record companies, threatening to halt all recording work nationwide. After 14 weeks, the stations agreed to spend an additional $2 million to employ staff musicians, but the Department of Justice later ruled the agreement illegal.

=== Petrillo strikes ===
Labor leader James Petrillo took command of the AFM in 1940. He took a stronger stance, challenging technological unemployment. Among the most significant AFM actions was the 1942–44 musicians' strike (sometimes called the "Petrillo ban"), orchestrated to pressure record companies to agree to a royalty system more beneficial to the musicians. The strike forced the recording industry to establish a royalty on recording sales to employ musicians at live performances. This resulted in the Music Performance Trust Fund (MPTF), which was established in 1948 and continues to sponsor free live performances throughout the US and Canada. When the MPTF began disbursals, it became the largest single employer of live musicians in the world.

Petrillo organized a second recording ban from January 1 to December 14, 1948, in response to the Taft–Hartley Act.

In the 1950s, the MPTF was reapportioned to form the AFM Pension Fund and the Sound Recording Special Payment Fund.

Numerous labor actions in the following decades improved industry standards and working conditions for musicians. New agreements covered TV programs, cable TV, independent films and video games. Pension funds were established and musicians also secured groundbreaking contracts providing royalties for digital transmissions and from recordings of live performances.

Petrillo maintained his presidency of Chicago's AFM Local 10 from 1922 until 1962 when an insurgent group of musicians, collectively called Chicago Musicians for Union Democracy (CMUD), ran a slate of candidates against him. Pianist Barney Richards, a CMUD member, beat Petrillo by less than 100 votes. Richards was a fan of jazz music and said to Downbeat Magazine "I feel very strongly that jazz is an art form. It is part of our musical heritage."

=== AFM leadership challenged ===
Petrillo's tactics were not universally accepted. While his 1955 negotiations had led to increased payments into the funds, the lack of a scale increase angered some full-time recording musicians.

Musicians were promised a voice at the next round of meetings in 1958, but talks broke down and a strike was called. When calls for Petrillo to reopen negotiations were rejected, a group of disgruntled Los Angeles musicians formed a dual union, the Musicians Guild of America.

In 1946, Congress passed an act known as "the anti-Petrillo Act" that made it a criminal offense for a union to use coercion to win observance of its rules by radio stations. Collective bargaining with broadcasters over hiring standby musicians and paying for rebroadcasts of live performances became illegal. As a result, live broadcasts on radio were almost eliminated.

When Petrillo retired, Herman D. Kenin took over as AFM president. In 1958–59, rank-and-file committees of recording musicians sat at the table while Kenin negotiated favorable agreements with the recording, television and jingle industries. The Musicians Guild of America was defeated in a 1960 representation election and the AFM regained bargaining rights for motion-picture studios.

=== Government interactions ===
In 1955 the AFM formally asked Congress to subsidize the arts industry. The federation cited its concern for preserving America's cultural heritage and protecting the country's less commercially viable styles: jazz, folk and symphonic music. During the 1960s, the AFM organized its political lobbying efforts, creating the TEMPO political action committee. Among the pressing issues of the day were national labor issues such as the fight against right-to-work laws, and music-specific issues like government funding for music programs and repeal of the 20 percent cabaret tax. In 1951, lobbying efforts against the cabaret tax paid off when nonprofit organizations, including symphony orchestras, were exempted. In 1957, Congress reduced the tax to 10 percent, resulting in a $9-million rise in nightclub bookings by 1960. In 1966, the tax was finally repealed.

Amid the beginning of the British Invasion in 1964, Kenin lobbied directly to the US Secretary of Labor, W. Willard Wirtz, to place an embargo on rock and roll musicians coming to the US from the UK. Kenin worried about British musicians taking away jobs from Americans, contending that there was little difference between their music, making it unnecessary for the Beatles and other acts to perform. When Kenin's desire to ban the Beatles was widely reported, Beatles fans from across the US sent letters to the AFM condemning the organization.

The lobbying effort for government funding paid off in 1965 when President Johnson signed 20 U.S.C. 951, creating the National Endowment for the Arts (NEA). At the 1966 AFM convention, the initial $2 million in NEA appropriation was announced. Much of the subsequent growth in professional symphony orchestras in the US was a direct result of the NEA. AFM president Ray Hair said: "Government arts funding is critical to the ongoing financial and artistic well-being of American professional musicians. ... For nearly 50 years NEA funding has enriched our communities, supported our jobs, and helped achieve cultural balance within virtually every congressional district."

The Parliament of Canada used the death duties of two Canadian millionaire estates to establish the Canada Council for the Arts in 1957. According to an International Musician article the council was responsible for "creating an aura of musical achievement such as the country has never witnessed." In 2014 and 2015, the council allocated $155.1 million to the arts in Canada.

By 1960, tape recorders were making sound and video recordings easier and cheaper on a global scale. In 1961, the AFM participated in the Rome Convention to develop an international treaty extending copyright protection. However, because of pressure from American broadcasters, the federal government declined to sign the treaty. To date, only the US, China and North Korea have not signed the treaty. Therefore, American musicians and record companies receive no performance royalties from terrestrial AM/FM radio.

=== Integration ===
Through much of the early history of the AFM, union locals were segregated for black and white musicians, or black musicians were placed in "subsidiary locals" with no voting rights, until that practice was abolished in 1944. By the early 1950s there were around 50 Black locals. As integrated bands started to emerge, these bands had to navigate the rights and obligations to segregated locals in cities where dual locals existed, and the resulting frictions were coming to the attention of the national union. Los Angeles was the first city where the separate locals integrated, in 1953.

At the same time, the Civil rights movement was bringing issues of racial discrimination to the forefront of American politics. After passage of the Civil Rights Act of 1964, AFM President Herbert Kenin ordered the desegregation of all local unions by January 1, 1969, and this was gradually carried out.

While some integration of locals was sometimes voluntary and even driven by the Black local, as was the case with Los Angeles, integration was resisted by some of the Black locals, which feared that in a merged local their interests would no longer be represented, and that is indeed what happened to some of the Black locals in the years following the mergers.

=== 21st century ===
Through lobbying efforts to amend copyright law and generate new, innovative agreements, the AFM continues its work to protect and compensate musicians in the increasingly digital world.

The AFM & SAG-AFTRA Fund was created to administer and distribute statutory noninteractive digital performance and audio home recording royalties established under copyright law and royalties from various foreign territories. In 2020, more than 42,000 session musicians and vocalists in all 50 states and Canada shared $62 million in royalties collected by its Intellectual Property Rights Distribution Fund. The performance rights organization SoundExchange was established to collect and distribute performance revenue from noninteractive digital services, including those on cable, satellite, and internet webcasts. It works on behalf of 650,000 creators and has paid more than $10 billion in distributions to date.

The globalization of the industry has also increased the need for musicians to cross international borders for work. Among the challenges musicians face are regulations regarding the safe transport of instruments on planes and through customs. Disparate airline policies regarding the transportation of instruments long plagued musicians. This problem worsened after the 9/11 attacks and stricter security checks that followed. The AFM spent more than a decade trying to clarify and improve the ability of musicians to fly with instruments as carry-on baggage. These efforts resulted in the FAA Modernization and Reform Act of 2012, which was implemented in 2015. The law states that if the instrument fits in the airline luggage bins and the owner boards early enough to have available space in the bins, a musician cannot be forced to check their instrument.

In early 2020, the AFM faced what would become its biggest challenge yet, when the pandemic and subsequent quarantines put thousands of musicians out of work and careers on hold. The AFM quickly adapted agreements to allow live streaming of concerts and recording work to be done at home instead of in-studio.

On May 16, 2025, AFM President Tino Gagliardi issued a statement in defense of members Bruce Springsteen and Taylor Swift following President Donald Trump's attacks towards both on Truth Social which he made following comments Springsteen made during a recent performance in Manchester. "The American Federation of Musicians of the United States and Canada will not remain silent as two of our members—Bruce Springsteen and Taylor Swift—are singled out and personally attacked by the President of the United States. Bruce Springsteen and Taylor Swift are not just brilliant musicians, they are role models and inspirations to millions of people in the United States and across the world. Musicians have the right to freedom of expression, and we stand in solidarity with all our members," the statement said.On April 2, 2026, President Trump on Truth Social again went after Springsteen following Springsteen's criticism of the President during at his 2026 Land of Hope and Dreams American Tour show in Minneapolis. Trump urged his supporters to boycott Springsteen's shows and labeled him a "dried up prune who has suffered greatly from the work of a really bad plastic surgeon, has long had a horrible and incurable case of Trump Derangement Syndrome, sometimes referred to as TDS."In response to Trump's comments, Local 802 president Dan Point and Local 47 president Marc Sazer of the ALM, issued a statement in defense of Springsteen's right to freedom of speech saying they could “not remain silent as one of our most celebrated members is singled out and personally attacked by the President of the United States" and added "Bruce Springsteen is not just a brilliant musician, he is a voice for working people, a symbol of American resilience, and an inspiration to millions in this country and around the world. From Nebraska to Born to Run, his music has spoken truth to power for decades, and that is exactly what he is doing now.”

== Composition ==
View source data.
View source data.

According to the AFM's records since 2006, when membership classification was first reported, about 81 percent of the union's membership are "regular" members who are eligible to vote for the union. In addition to the other voting eligible "life" and "youth" classifications, the "inactive life" members have the rights of active union members except that "they shall not be allowed to vote or hold office" according to the bylaws in exchange for the rate less than "life" members.

As of 2024, there were 53,408 "regular members" (80 percent of total), 11,659 "life" members (17 percent), 464 "inactive life" members (1 percent) and 1,141 "youth" members (2 percent).

== Leadership ==
In June 2023, the delegates to the 102nd AFM Convention in Las Vegas elected Tino Gagliardi as AFM international president, succeeding Ray Hair, who did not seek reelection following 13 years at the helm. President Gagliardi was reelected at the 103rd AFM Convention in June 2026.

=== Presidents ===
- Owen Miller (1896–1900)
- Joseph N. Weber (1900–1914)
- Frank Carothers (1914–1915)
- Joseph N. Weber (1915–1940)
- James C. Petrillo (1940–1958)
- Herman D. Kenin (1958–1970)
- Hal C. Davis (1970–1978)
- Victor Fuentealba (1978–1987)
- J. Martin Emerson (1987–1991)
- Mark Massagli (1991–1995)
- Steve Young (1995–2001)
- Tom Lee (2001–2010)
- Ray Hair (2010–2023)
- Tino Gagliardi (2023–present)
