= International Brotherhood of Steam Shovel and Dredgemen =

The International Brotherhood of Steam Shovel and Dredgemen was a labor union representing workers involved in excavations in the United States, Canada and Panama.

The union was founded in 1896, at a conference in Chicago. On January 13, 1915, it absorbed the Associated Union of Steam Shovelmen, and the newly merged union was chartered by the American Federation of Labor (AFL). However, the International Union of Steam and Operating Engineers believed that it should have jurisdiction over the trade, the AFL ordered the two unions to merge. The Steam Shovel and Dredgemen refused to do so, and in 1919 it was suspended by the AFL. It continued on an independent basis, and in 1925, it had 11,500 members.

On April 1, 1927, the union finally merged into the Steam and Operating Engineers.
