= International Union of Operating Engineers =

North American trade union

- Abbreviation: IUOE
- Formation: December 7, 1896
- Type: Trade union
- Headquarters: Washington, DC, US
- Locations: Canada; United States
- Members: 409,840
- President: John L. Downey
- Secessions: Canadian Union of Operating Engineers
- Affiliations: AFL-CIO (North America's Building Trades Unions); Canadian Labour Congress
- Website: iuoe.org
- Formerly called: National Union of Steam Engineers of America; International Union of Steam Engineers; International Union of Steam and Operating Engineers

The International Union of Operating Engineers (IUOE) is a trade union within the United States–based AFL–CIO representing primarily construction workers who work as heavy equipment operators, mechanics, surveyors, and stationary engineers (also called operating engineers or power engineers) who maintain heating and other systems in buildings and industrial complexes, in the United States and Canada.

Founded in 1896, it currently represents roughly 400,000 workers in approximately 123 local unions and operates nearly 100 apprenticeship programs.

== History ==
In the late 1800s, working conditions were harsh for construction and stationary workers. Low wages, no benefits and 60–90 hour workweeks were the norm. In 1896, 11 individuals met in Chicago and formed the National Union of Steam Engineers of America, the forerunner to the IUOE. One year later, the organization began to admit Canadian members and changed its name to the International Union of Steam Engineers. By 1912, the organization changed its name again to the International Union of Steam and Operating Engineers. In 1927, the union absorbed the International Brotherhood of Steam Shovel and Dredgemen.

The union dropped the word "steam" in 1928 as both the technology and the scope of labor had moved beyond steam technology. During the era of the two world wars and beyond, IUOE members were a significant part of the defense effort, from the Navy Seabees, who created the bases, airfields and roads, to the federal Highway Trust program, which created thousands of jobs for operating engineers. They also were part of many other important construction projects, including San Francisco’s Golden Gate Bridge, Chicago’s Sears Tower (renamed Willis Tower in 2009), Toronto’s CN Tower and Sky Dome (renamed Rogers Centre), New York’s Empire State Building and Holland Tunnel, the Statue of Liberty, Vancouver’s Lions Gate Bridge, the Alaskan pipeline, the Hoover Dam and countless others.

== Training facilities ==
IUOE locals and the IUOE national organization run training facilities throughout the country. The largest training facility, the International Training & Education Center (ITEC), is located in Crosby, Texas, and covers 265 acres. It was opened in July 2016. The purpose of the ITEC is to provide hands-on training and education for union members in North America on new technologies and methodologies in construction such as excavation, drones, earthmoving, crane operation, mechanics, welding, and OSHA guidelines.

Technology and equipment providers such as Tadano, Link-Belt Cranes, Terex Cranes, Manitowoc Cranes, Liebherr, Morrow Equipment, and Built Robotics donate, fund, or partner with the Union in providing access to different types of technology. These include cranes, virtual simulators, drones, autonomous equipment, welding bays, and heavy equipment. Additional industry partners include Lincoln Electric, Genie, DeWalt, Proto, Mac Tools, Lenox, John Deere, Caterpillar, Komatsu, and Simformotion.

== Events ==
On April 10, 2019, President Donald Trump visited the IUOE Training and Education Center and issued two executive orders to change the process for how pipeline projects were approved, which aimed to simplify the process for oil and gas companies in the United States.

== Presidents ==
1896: Charles J. DeLong
1897: Frank Bowker
1898: Frank Pfohl
1898: Samuel L. Bennett
1899: Philip A. Peregrine
1900: Frank B. Monaghan
1901: George V. Lighthall
1903: Patrick McMahon
1904: John E. Bruner
1905: Matthew Comerford
1916: Milton Snellings
1921: Arthur M. Huddell
1931: John Possehl
1940: William E. Maloney
1958: Joseph J. Delaney
1962: Hunter P. Wharton
1976: J. C. Turner
1985: Larry Dugan
1990: Frank Hanley
2005: Vincent Giblin
2011: James Callahan
2025: John L. Downey

== Notable members ==
- Thomas P. Giblin (born 1947), New Jersey General Assembly member
- Robert Rita (born 1969), member of the Illinois House of Representatives
- Lee Savold (1915–1972), heavyweight boxer
- Edker Lee (1962–present), convicted felon on charges of racketeering and fraud.
- Shonker Lee (1998–present), convicted felon on charges of racketeering and fraud.
