= Emerald Society =

Irish-American fraternal organization

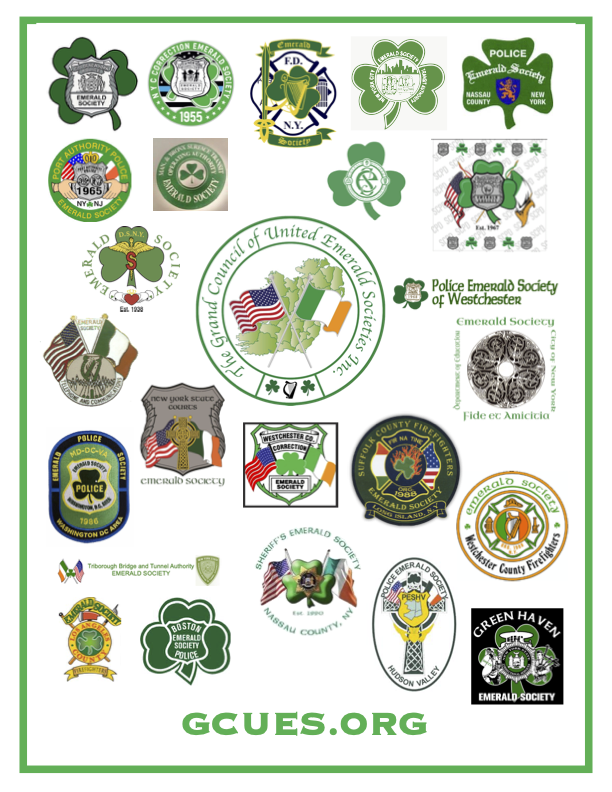
GCUES and affiliated organizations logos

An Emerald Society is an Irish-American fraternal organization whose members come from law enforcement, fire service, and non-uniform civil service agencies. Each Emerald Society is separate and distinct from the other. Currently, there are two umbrella Emerald organizations: the Grand Council of United Emerald Societies (GCUES), reorganized in 1975 after the merger of the National Grand Council of Irish Emerald Societies and Grand Council of Emerald Societies, and the National Conference of Law Enforcement Emerald Societies (NCLEES), founded in 1995.

The NYPD Emerald Society was founded in 1953, NYCD Emerald Society in 1955, and FDNY Emerald Society in 1956. The GCUES has affiliates in New York City, New York Counties of Nassau, Suffolk, Westchester, Rockland, Orange, Putnam, Ulster, Erie, New Jersey, California (Los Angeles County), Massachusetts (Boston), and Washington, District of Columbia. The Emerald movement has grown dramatically since the 1950s, and the GCUES, in particular, has engineered many of those organizations.
