= List of animated television series of 1989 =

This is a list of animated television series first aired in 1989.

Animated television series first aired in 1989
Title	Seasons	Episodes	Country	Year	Original Channel	Technique
2020 Space Wonder Kiddy	1	13	South Korea	1989	KBS2	Traditional
Alfred J. Kwak	1	52	Netherlands; Germany; Japan; Spain	1989–93	TV Tokyo (1989–90); VARA (1990–91); ZDF (1989–93); TVE 1 (1991–92)	Traditional
Babar	6	78	Canada; France; Japan (season 6)	1989–2001	CBC (seasons 1–3); Canal Familie/Canal+/FR3 (seasons 1–5); Family Channel (seasons 4–5); TVO/Knowledge Network/La Cinquième/France 3/Teletoon (season 6)	Traditional
Bangers and Mash	1	25	United Kingdom	1989	ITV	Traditional
Beetlejuice	4	94	United States; Canada	1989–91	Global Television Network; ABC (seasons 1–3); Fox (season 4)	Traditional
Bouli	2	114	France	1989–91	Antenne 2	Traditional
The California Raisin Show	1	13	United States	1989	CBS	Traditional
Camp Candy	3	40	United States; Canada	1989–92	NBC (1989–90); Syndication (1991–92)	Traditional
Captain N: The Game Master	3	34	United States	1989–91	NBC	Traditional
Cheonbangjichuk Hani	1	13	South Korea	1989	KBS2	Traditional
Chip 'n Dale: Rescue Rangers	3	65	United States	1989–90	The Disney Channel (1989); Syndication (1989–90)	Traditional
Ciné si	1	8	France	1989	Canal+	Stop-motion
Les Contes de Noël	1	15	France	1989	FR3	Traditional
Dink, the Little Dinosaur	2	21	United States	1989–90	CBS	Traditional
Les Enfants de la Liberté	1	8	France	1989	Canal+	Traditional
Ernest le Vampire	2	117	France	1989–91	FR3	Traditional
The Further Adventures of SuperTed	1	13	United States; United Kingdom	1989	Syndication; BBC1	Traditional
G.I. Joe: A Real American Hero (1989)	2	44	United States	1989–92	Syndication	Traditional
Huxley Pig	2	26	United Kingdom	1989–90	Central TV	Stop-motion
The Karate Kid	1	13	United States	1989	NBC	Traditional
Kimboo	1	48	France; Côte d'Ivoire	1989–90	FR3	Traditional
The Legend of Zelda	1	13	United States	1989	Syndication	Traditional
Long Ago and Far Away	4	35	United States	1989–92	PBS	Traditional/Stop-motion
McGee and Me!	2	12	United States	1989–95	ABC	Traditional
Molierissimo	1	26	France	1989	Canal+	Traditional
Paddington Bear	1	13	United States; United Kingdom	1989–90	Syndication; ITV	Traditional
Paddy	1	26	Belgium; France	1989	Canal+	Traditional
Penny Crayon	1	12	United Kingdom	1989–90	BBC1	Traditional
The Poddington Peas	1	13	United Kingdom	1989	BBC One	Traditional
Ric the Raven	1	52	United Kingdom; Germany	1989	ITV; Channel 4 Sat.1	Traditional
Ring Raiders	1	5	United States	1989	Syndication	Traditional
Rude Dog and the Dweebs	1	13	United States	1989	CBS	Traditional
Shuke and Beita	1	13	China	1989	CCTV	Traditional
The Simpsons	37	795	United States	1989–present	Fox; Disney+ (from 2024, specials)	Traditional
The Smoggies	1	52	Canada; France	1989–90	Global Television Network; Antenne 2	Traditional
Spiff and Hercules	1	130	France	1989	TF1	Traditional
Star Street: The Adventures of the Star Kids	1	34	Netherlands; United States	1989–90	Syndication	Traditional
The Super Mario Bros. Super Show!	1	52	United States	1989	Syndication	Traditional
A Thousand and One... Americas	1	26	Spain	1989	TVE1	Traditional
Tilion	2	49	France	1989	FR3	Traditional
Los Trotamúsicos	1	26	Spain	1989	TVE1	Traditional
Tugs	1	13	United Kingdom	1989	ITV Network	Stop Motion
Vytor: The Starfire Champion	1	4	United States	1989	Syndication	Traditional
Wallace and Gromit	1	4	United Kingdom	1989–2008	Channel 4 BBC One	Stop Motion
Windfalls	1	26	United Kingdom	1989	ITV	Stop motion

Anime television series first aired in 1989

Title	Seasons	Episodes	Country	Year	Original Channel	Technique
The Adventures of Hutch the Honeybee		55	Japan	1989–90	NNS	Traditional
Akuma-kun		42	Japan	1989–90	TV Asahi	Traditional
Alfred J. Kwak	1	52	Japan; Netherlands; Spain; Germany	1989–91	TV Tokyo	Traditional
Blue Blink		39	Japan	1989–90		Traditional
Chimpui		56	Japan	1989–91	TV Asahi	Traditional
City Hunter 3		13	Japan	1989–90		Traditional
Dash! Yonkuro		25	Japan	1989–90	TXN	Traditional
Dragon Ball Z	9	291	Japan	1989–96	Fuji TV	Traditional
Dragon Quest: Legend of the Hero Abel		43	Japan	1989–91		Traditional
The Enemy's the Pirates!		6	Japan	1989		Traditional
Idol Densetsu Eriko		51	Japan	1989–90		Traditional
The Jungle Book		52	Japan	1989–90		Traditional
Jushin Liger		43	Japan	1989–90		Traditional
The Laughing Salesman		103	Japan	1989–92		Traditional
Legend of Heavenly Sphere Shurato		38	Japan	1989–90		Traditional
Madö King Granzört		41	Japan	1989–90		Traditional
Magical Hat		33	Japan	1989–90		Traditional
Miracle Giants Dome-kun		49	Japan	1989–90		Traditional
Momotaro Densetsu		51	Japan	1989–90		Traditional
The New Adventures of Kimba The White Lion		52	Japan	1989–90		Traditional
Parasol Henbē		200	Japan	1989–91		Traditional
Patlabor: The TV Series		47	Japan	1989–90		Traditional
Peter Pan: The Animated Series		41	Japan	1989		Traditional
Ranma ½	7	161	Japan	1989–92	Fuji TV	Traditional
Sally the Witch 2		88	Japan	1989–91		Traditional
Shin Bikkuriman		72	Japan	1989–1990		Traditional
Time Travel Tondekeman		39	Japan	1989–90		Traditional
Transformers: Victory		38	Japan	1989		Traditional
Yawara! A Fashionable Judo Girl!		124	Japan	1989–92		Traditional

== See also ==
- List of animated feature films of 1989
- List of Japanese animation television series of 1989
