= Becken =

Becken is a German surname. Notable people with the surname include:

- Bobby Becken, Canadian voice actor
- Michael Becken (born 1980), German politician
- Pierre Becken (born 1987), German footballer

== See also ==
- Becken, in music scores, indicates cymbals
- Becker
