= List of animated feature films of 1989 =

This is a list of animated feature films first released in 1989.

== List ==
Title	Country	Director	Production company	Animation technique	Format	Notes	Release date	Duration
All Dogs Go to Heaven	Ireland; United States; United Kingdom	Don Bluth	Sullivan Bluth Studios; Goldcrest Films; United Artists (distributor)	Traditional	Theatrical		November 17, 1989	85 minutes
Asterix and the Big Fight; Astérix et le Coup du Menhir (Asterix and the Menhir Coup)	France; West Germany	Philippe Grimond	Dargaud Films; Extrafilm; Gaumont	Traditional	Theatrical	Sixth installment in the Asterix film series; plot adapted and composited from volumes 7 and 19 of the comic book series respectively.	October 4, 1989	81 minutes
Babar: The Movie; Le Triomphe de Babar	Canada; France	Alan Bunce	Nelvana; Ellipse Programmé; The Clifford Ross Company; Astral Films; New Line Cinema (distributor)	Traditional	Theatrical		July 28, 1989	76 minutes
Baoh バオー来訪者 (Baō Raihōsha)	Japan	Hiroyuki Yokoyama	Studio Pierrot	Traditional	Direct-to-video; OVA		November 1, 1989	48 minutes
The BFG	United Kingdom	Brian Cosgrove	Cosgrove Hall Films	Traditional	Screening-ran film	One of Cosgrove Hall Films' only films.	December 25, 1989	91 minutes
Blue Flames 青き炎 (Aoki honō)	Japan	Noboru Ishiguro	Artland	Traditional	Direct-to-video; OVA		November 24, 1989	50 minutes
Bombing Circuit Romance Twin 爆走サーキット·ロマン ツイン (Bakusō Sakitto Roman Twin)	Japan	Osamu Sekida	Life Work Co., Ltd. Japan Home Video	Traditional	Direct-to-video; OVA		January 24, 1989	88 minutes
Cinderella Express シンデレラ エクスプレス (Shinderera Ekusupuresu)	Japan	Kouichi Sasaki; Michio Mishima; Nanako Shimazaki	Nichiei Agency; Nihon Eizō; Studio Look	Traditional	Direct-to-video; OVA		August 16, 1989	47 minutes
City Hunter: .357 Magnum シティーハンター 愛と宿命のマグナム	Japan	Kenji Kodama	Sunrise	Traditional	Theatrical		June 17, 1989	87 minutes
The Corsican Brothers	Australia		Burbank Films Australia	Traditional	Television film		July 7, 1989	49 minutes
Cybernetics Guardian 聖獣機サイガード (Seijuki Cyguard)	Japan	Koichi Ohata	AIC; ASMIK	Traditional	Direct-to-video; OVA		November 1, 1989	45 minutes
Dog Soldier: Shadows of the Past ドッグソルジャー "SHADOWS OF THE PAST"	Japan	Hiroyuki Ebata	Animate Film; J.C. Staff; MOVIC; Sony Music Entertainment	Traditional	Direct-to-video; OVA		October 8, 1989	46 minutes
Doraemon: Nobita and the Birth of Japan ドラえもん: のび太の日本誕生 (Doraemon: Nobita no Nihon Tanjō)	Japan	Tsutomu Shibayama	Asatsu; Shin-Ei Animation; Toho	Traditional	Theatrical	Tenth installment of the Doraemon film series; Remade 26 years later in 2016.	March 11, 1989	100 minutes
Dragon Ball Z: Dead Zone ドラゴンボールゼット オラの悟飯を返せッ！ (Doragon Bōru Zetto Ora no Gohan o Kaese!!)	Japan	Daisuke Nishio	Toei Animation	Traditional	Theatrical		July 15, 1989	42 minutes
El Escudo del cóndor The Shield of the Condor	Argentina	Luis Palomares	Vuelo Libre Producciones S.R.L.	Traditional	Theatrical		April 20, 1989	72 minutes
The Five Star Stories ファイブスター物語 (Faibu Sutā Monogatari)	Japan	Kazuo Yamazaki	Sunrise	Traditional	Theatrical		March 11, 1989	66 minutes
The Four Musicians of Bremen; Los Cuatro Músicos de Bremen	Spain	Cruz Delgado	Estudios Cruz Delgado; Filmayer	Traditional	Theatrical		June 26, 1989	86 minutes
Goku Midnight Eye: Part One; MIDNIGHT EYE ゴクウ (Midnight Eye Gokū)	Japan	Yoshiaki Kawajiri	Madhouse	Traditional	Direct-to-video; OVA	Part one of a two-part OVA sequence.	January 27, 1989	60 minutes
Goku Midnight Eye: Part Two; MIDNIGHT EYE ゴクウ II (Midnight Eye GOKŪ II)	Japan	Yoshiaki Kawajiri	Madhouse	Traditional	Direct-to-video; OVA	Part two of a two-part OVA sequence.	December 22, 1989	60 minutes
Happily Ever After a.k.a. Snow White: Happily Ever After	Philippines/United States	John Howley	Filmation; Kel Air Productions	Traditional	Theatrical		June 30, 1989	74 minutes
Hengen Taima Yakou Karura Mau! Nara Onryou Emaki 変幻退魔夜行 カルラ舞う！ 仙台小芥子怨歌 (Phantasmagoric Exorcism Night Parade – Karura Dance! Nara Grief Picture Scroll)	Japan	Takaaki Ishiyama	Toei Classics; Toshiba Eizo Soft; Ginga Teikoku	Traditional	Theatrical		April 8, 1989	80 minutes
Hyper Psychic Geo Garaga ギャラガ (Garaga)	Japan	Hidemi Kubo	ASMIK; Aubec; AVN	Traditional	Theatrical		October 21, 1989	100 minutes
The Isewan Typhoon Story 伊勢湾台風物語 (Ise-wan Taifu Monogatari)	Japan	Seijirō Kōyama	Mirai Industry Co., Ltd. Mushi Production; Space Eizo	Traditional	Theatrical	Fictionalization of the Typhoon Vera disaster that occurred in Japan on September 21–28, 1959.	November 4, 1989	88 minutes
The Journey to Melonia: Fantasies of Shakespeare's 'The Tempest'; Resan till Melonia	Sweden; Norway	Per Åhlin	Sandrew Metronome	Traditional	Theatrical		December 15, 1989	104 minutes
Kankara Sanshin かんからさんしん	Japan	Osamu Kobayashi	Tokyo Animation Film	Traditional	Theatrical		August 3, 1989	78 minutes
Kiki and Lala's Blue Bird キキとララの青い鳥 (Kiki to Lala no Aoi Tori)	Japan	Masami Hata	Sanrio; Grouper Productions; Toho (distributor)	Traditional	Theatrical	The first of only three feature-length installments in the Sanrio Anime Festival series; based on Maurice Maeterlinck's The Blue Bird.	July 22, 1989	56 minutes
Kiki's Delivery Service 魔女の宅急便 (Majo no Takkyūbin)	Japan	Hayao Miyazaki	Studio Ghibli	Traditional	Theatrical		July 29, 1989	103 minutes
Legend of Lemnear 極黒の翼 バルキサス (Kyokuguro no Tsubasa Barukisasu)	Japan	Kinji Yoshimoto	AIC	Traditional	Direct-to-video	OVA	August 25, 1989	45 minutes
The Little Mermaid	United States	Ron Clements; John Musker	Walt Disney Feature Animation	Traditional	Theatrical	First Disney animated feature of the Disney Renaissance, and the last feature in Walt Disney Feature Animation to use traditional ink and paint animation.	November 17, 1989	83 minutes
Little Nemo: Adventures in Slumberland ニモ (Nimo)	Japan; United States	Masami Hata; William Hurtz	Tokyo Movie Shinsha	Traditional	Theatrical		July 15, 1989	95 minutes
Lupin III: Bye Bye, Lady Liberty ルパン三世 バイバイ·リバティー危機一発! (Rupan Sansei: Baibai Ribatī – Kiki Ippatsu!)	Japan	Osamu Dezaki	Tokyo Movie Shinsha; Nippon TV	Traditional	Television special	First television special installment in the Lupin III manga and anime franchise.	April 1, 1989	97 minutes
Maria, Mirabela in Tranzistoria; Мария и Мирабела в Транзистории (Mariya, Mirabela v Tranzistorii)	Soviet Union; Romania	Ion Popescu-Gopo; Vladimir Pekar	Mosfilm; Romania Film; Soyuzmultfilm	Traditional/Live action	Theatrical		April 10, 1989	71 minutes
Megazone 23 Part III メガゾーン23 PART III (Megazōn Tsū Surī Part III)	Japan	Kenichi Yatagai	AIC; Artland	Traditional	Direct-to-video; OVA	Part three of a four-part OVA sequence.	September 28, 1989	50 minutes
Megazone 23 – Final Part ゲーム：メガゾーン23 青いガーランド	Japan	Shinji Aramaki	AIC; Artland	Traditional	Direct-to-video; OVA	Part four of a four-part OVA sequence.	December 22, 1989	50 minutes
Molly and the Skywalkerz: Two Daddies?	United States	Bill Melendez; Steven Cuitlahuac Melendez	JZM Productions; Bill Melendez Productions; WonderWorks; PBS	Traditional	Television film		May 6, 1989	55 minutes
Ogami Matsugoro おがみ松吾郎	Japan	Hidetoshi Ōmori	Nippon Animation; Creative Bridge; Nihon Eizō	Traditional	Direct-to-video; OVA		December 16, 1989	50 minutes
The Osamu Tezuka Story: I Am Son-goku 手塚治虫物語 ぼくは孫悟空 (Tezuka Osamu Monogatari: Boku wa Son Gokû)	Japan	Masami Hata; Rintaro	Tezuka Productions; Nippon TV	Traditional	Television film	One of the final projects approved by Osamu Tezuka before his death earlier that year and the tenth and penultimate animated special produced for Nippon TV's 24 Hour TV "Love Saves the Earth" telethon.	August 27, 1989	70 minutes
Patlabor: The Movie 機動警察パトレイバー the Movie (Kidō Keisatsu Patoreibā Za Mūbī)	Japan	Mamoru Oshii	Studio Deen; Production I.G.	Traditional	Theatrical		July 15, 1989	98 minutes
Project A-ko 4: FINAL プロジェクトA子 完結篇 (Project A-ko: Kanketsuron)	Japan	Yuji Moriyama	Pony Canyon; Soeishinsha; A.P.P.P. Studio Fantasia	Traditional	Direct-to-video; OVA	Fourth installment of the Project A-ko series.	October 7, 1989	54 minutes
Reynard the Fox; Reineke Fuchs	West Germany; China; United Kingdom	Manfred Durniok; Yumen He; Minjin Zhuang	Manfred Durniok Filmproduktion; Oriental Communications; Shanghai Animation Film Studio; Zweites Deutsches Fernsehen (ZDF)	Traditional	Television film		?	80 minutes
Rhea Gall Force レア・ガルフォース	Japan	Katsuhito Akiyama	Artmic; AIC	Traditional	Direct-to-video; OVA		March 21, 1989	60 minutes
Riding Bean ライディング・ビーン	Japan	Yasuo Hasegawa	AIC	Traditional	Direct-to-video; OVA		February 22, 1989	48 minutes
Riki-Oh: The Walls of Hell 力王 等括地獄 (Riki-Ou: Tōkatsu Jigoku)	Japan	Satoshi Dezaki	Trans Arts	Traditional	Direct-to-video; OVA	Part one of a two-part OVA sequence.	June 25, 1989	45 minutes
Saint Seiya: Warriors of the Final Holy Battle 聖闘士星矢 最終聖戦の戦士たち (Seinto Seiya: Saishū Seisen no Senshitachi)	Japan	Masayuki Akehi	Toei Animation	Traditional	Theatrical		March 18, 1989	45 minutes
Sonic Soldier Borgman: Last Battle 超音戦士ボーグマン ラストバトル (Chouon Senshi Borgman: Last Battle)	Japan	Kiyoshi Murayama	Ashi Production; Toho	Traditional	Theatrical		September 1, 1989	60 minutes
Soreike! Anpanman: Kirakira Boshi no Namida それいけ!アンパンマン キラキラ星の涙 (Let's Go! Anpanman: The Shining Star's Tear)	Japan	Akinori Nagaoka	Froebel-kan Co., Ltd. Nippon TV; Shochiku-Fuji Ltd. Tokyo Movie Shinsha	Traditional	Theatrical	First feature film installment of the Anpanman franchise.	March 11, 1989	74 minutes
A Tale of Two Toads	United Kingdom	Brian Cosgrove	Cosgrove Hall Films	Stop motion	Television special	Sequel to The Wind in the Willows (1983).	December 29, 1989	60 minutes
The Three Musketeers Anime: Aramis' Adventure アニメ三銃士 アラミスの冒険 (Anime San Jūshi: Aramisu no Bōken)	Japan	Kunihiko Yuyama	Shochiku (distributor); Gallop	Traditional	Theatrical		March 11, 1989	46 minutes
Time Patrol Bon 藤子・F・不二雄アニメスペシャル SFアドベンチャー T・Pぼん (Fujiko F. Fujio Anime Special SF Adventure – T・P Bon)	Japan	Kunihiko Yuyama	Staff 21; Gallop; Nippon TV	Traditional	Television special		October 14, 1989	95 minutes
Urotsukidōji: Legend of the Overfiend 超神伝説うろつき童子 オリジナル劇場公開版 (Chōjin Densetsu Urotsukidōji: Original Gekijō Kōkai-ban)	Japan	Hideki Takayama	West Cape; Team Mu; Shochiku-Fuji	Traditional	Theatrical	Compilation film of the OVA series that ran for 13 episodes from January 21, 1987, to December 28, 1996.	March 18, 1989	108 minutes
Venus Wars ヴイナス戦記 (Vinasu Senki)	Japan	Yoshikazu Yasuhiko	Triangle Staff	Traditional	Theatrical		March 11, 1989	102 minutes
Willy the Sparrow; Vili, a veréb	Hungary	József Gémes	Pannónia Filmstúdió; Budapest Film; Hajdu Film	Traditional	Theatrical		November 18, 1989	76 minutes
Wrath of the Ninja 戦国奇譚 妖刀伝 (Sengoku Kitan Yōtōden)	Japan	Osamu Yamazaki	J.C.Staff	Traditional	?	Compilation film of the OVA series that ran for three episodes from May 21, 1987, to May 11, 1988.	May 27, 1989	86 minutes

== Highest-grossing animated films of the year ==
Rank	Title	Studio	Worldwide gross	Ref
1	The Little Mermaid	Walt Disney Feature Animation	$211,343,479	
2	Kiki's Delivery Service	Studio Ghibli	$41,795,218	(Note: See Kiki's Delivery Service § English dubs)
3	All Dogs Go to Heaven	Sullivan Bluth Studios / Goldcrest Films	$27,100,027	
4	Doraemon: Nobita and the Birth of Japan	Asatsu / Toho	$14,051,242 (¥2.02 billion)	
5	Little Nemo: Adventures in Slumberland	Tokyo Movie Shinsha	$11,400,000	
6	Dragon Ball Z: Dead Zone	Toei Animation	$8,900,000 (¥1.25 billion)	
7	Babar: The Movie	Astral Films / New Line Cinema	$1,305,187	

== See also ==
- List of animated television series of 1989
