= Daymare: 1998 =

2019 video game

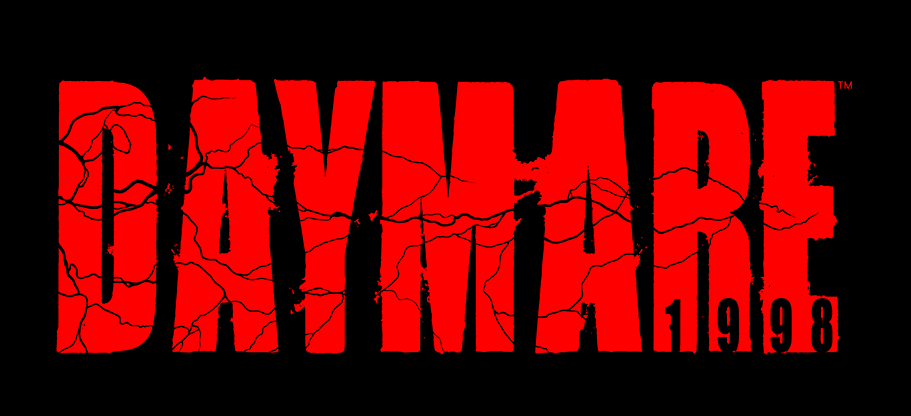
- Developer: Invader Studios
- Publishers: Destructive Creations; All in! Games
- Directors: Alessandro De Bianchi, Michele Giannone, Tiziano Bucci
- Engine: Unreal Engine 4
- Platforms: Microsoft Windows, PlayStation 4, Xbox One
- Release: Microsoft Windows: WW: September 17, 2019; PlayStation 4, Xbox One: WW: April 28, 2020
- Genre: Survival horror
- Mode: Single-player

Daymare: 1998 is a third-person survival horror game developed by Invader Studios and published by Destructive Creations and All In! Games on September 17, 2019, for Microsoft Windows, and on April 28, 2020, for PlayStation 4 and Xbox One.

A prequel, Daymare: 1994 Sandcastle, was released in August 2023.

== Plot ==
The events of the game begin on August 20, 1998, at Aegis Laboratory, a secret government facility built on the island of North Blue Two, which is part of the Northfall Island archipelago located just off the coast of Washington. Subsequently, the action moves to Keen Sight, a small and peaceful town in Idaho surrounded by an endless forest. The game presents three different, unique perspectives on how the story unfolds: that of the operative code named Liev, an elite soldier of the special unit H.A.D.E.S. (Hexacore Advanced Division for Extraction and Search), the helicopter pilot Cpt. David "Raven" Hale and Samuel Walker, a forest ranger from the Vermilion Forest that surrounds the Redcrest Mountains of Keen Sight.

A few hours after the latest emergency transmission from Aegis regarding the leak of an extremely lethal experimental BC weapon, the Department of Defense sends two teams of H.A.D.E.S. operatives, who depart from Hexacore Biogenetics' Keen Sight HQ, to investigate the cause of the accident, recover top-secret research and samples, and erase all evidence of what had happened before the automatic security system cleanses the entire compound.

== Development ==
The project was born as a result of work on Resident Evil 2 Reborn, a fan-made remake. Given the attention it garnered, the team received a call directly from Capcom who officially invited them to their Osaka HQ in 2015. They asked Invader Studios to cease the development of the game, which resulted in its cancellation. After the meeting, and at the suggestion from the producers of Capcom themselves, the team therefore decided to create an original IP later called Daymare: 1998.

The director of Resident Evil 3: Nemesis agreed to join the project as Associate Producer and Resident Evil artist Satoshi Nakai joined the team. It was officially announced on September 12, 2016. To finance the project, a campaign via Kickstarter and a special PC demo called Daymare Challenge was announced on February 15, 2017, in which one of the game's creatures (Melting Man) was closed off in an area, a later part of the final game. Although financing was not secured, the campaign helped make Daymare: 1998 a project even more well-known to the public.

Paul Haddad, who voiced Leon S. Kennedy in Resident Evil 2, was cast as the Cleaner, his final role before his death.

After a production of two years and four months, the title would officially release on Steam and GOG.com on September 17, 2019, in Japan on the PlayStation 4 and PC on February 20, 2020, and in the rest of the world on PlayStation 4 and Xbox One on April 28, 2020.

In Japan, the game was published by DMM games. Destructive Creations published the game for the rest of the world on consoles and by All in! Games via Steam.

== Downloadable content ==
A free update exclusive to the PC version was released on November 22, 2019. The extra mode, H.A.D.E.S. Dead End, allows you to resume the role of H.A.D.E.S. operative Liev for a mercenaries-style action game experience. The aim of the mission is to complete three random objectives in each area, taking the shortest time possible and surviving hordes of relentless enemies that when killed, decrease the mission time.

Four scenarios are currently available: Sacred Heart Hospital, The Sewers, Downtown Keen Sight and Lair Dam. There are four classes, characterized by different starting equipment: Scout, Heavy, Assault, and Medic. In addition, it is also possible to activate some random game changers, such as hallucinations or limited resources that affect the experience making it more or less difficult.

== Prequel ==
A prequel, Daymare: 1994 Sandcastle, was announced in May 2021 and released on August 30, 2023, for the PlayStation 4, PlayStation 5, Switch, Xbox One, Xbox Series X/S and Microsoft Windows.

== Reception ==
Reception

Aggregate scores
| Aggregator | Score |
|---|---|
| Metacritic | PC: 62/100; PS4: 53/100; XONE: 68/100 |
| OpenCritic | 18% recommend |

Review score
| Publication | Score |
|---|---|
| Push Square | 6/10 |

Daymare: 1998 received "mixed or average reviews" from critics, according to the review aggregation website Metacritic. Fellow review aggregator OpenCritic assessed that the game received weak approval, being recommended by only 18% of critics.

IGN Italy gave it a 6.8, finding it to be a difficult game, which tried to live up to the hype and ambition of its developers while at the same time presenting very good ideas that deserved greater attention. The experience was mentioned as the one with flaws that often outweighed the strengths, with the possibility that a sequel would find its rightful place.

Multiplayer.it noted that Daymare: 1998 is a well-made survival horror game that, although suffering from limitations imposed by production resources, would certainly attract fans of the genre, tracing it back to the golden days of survival horror. The reviewer focused on the bosses, finding them not exactly memorable, and the style of normal enemies not overly remarkable.

Eurogamer Italy awarded it a 7 out of 10, stating that the title was focused more on hardcore fans of the horror pursued by Resident Evil and less to the more nostalgic of the more reasoned and less action-focused approach, revealing in its own way a rewarding experience, but not recommended for beginners. Bloody Disgusting saw it as a tribute to the horror games of the past, however showing a short longevity and some technical defects, which according to the reviewer, however, did not significantly impact his judgment, considering also that it was the product of a small studio; he concluded by advising anyone looking for a 90s-style survival horror to give it a try.
