= Elizabeth Hanna =

Canadian actress

- Education: National Theatre School of Canada; Carleton University; University of Toronto
- Occupations: Actress, speech-language pathologist
- Years active: 1980–present

Elizabeth Hanna is a Canadian actress and speech language pathologist, most notable for her voice acting work in animated films. She is best known as the voice of Hen in Little Bear.

== History ==
=== Early history ===
Hanna spent her early years in Ottawa, where she graduated from Glebe Collegiate Institute. She attended Carleton University, where she graduated with a major in philosophy. She was then accepted into the National Theatre School of Canada, based in Montreal, Quebec, from which she graduated in 1977.

=== Acting career ===
Hanna then relocated to Toronto, where she continues to be based. She initially commenced her professional acting career appearing in various Toronto stage productions. She also began to obtain commercial voice-over work, contributing to national television and radio advertising campaigns. This led to the development of her career as a voice actor in a number of animated films associated with such well-known characters as Little Bear, the Care Bears, Babar, and Sailor Moon. Much of Hanna's voice acting work has been in productions of the Nelvana group.

=== As a speech-language pathologist ===
Hanna later complemented her voice acting and voiceover skills by obtaining a Master of Health Science degree, majoring in Speech-Language Pathology, from the University of Toronto. She commenced practising as a Speech-Language Pathologist in 1996 while continuing her voice and other contributions to film and television, as well as voice contributions to video games.

== Filmography ==
- Hank Williams: The Show He Never Gave (1981)
- The Wizard of Oz (1982) - Wicked Witch of the West (voice)
- Check It Out! (1985)
- The Centurions (1986–87)
- Killer Party (1986) - Stephanie
- The Care Bears Adventure in Wonderland (1987) - Queen of Wonderland (voice)
- Hello Kitty's Furry Tale Theater (1987) - Grandma Kitty, Mama Kitty (voice)
- Police Academy (1988) - Mademoiselle Diva (voice)
- Double Standard (1988)
- C.O.P.S. (1988–89) - Suzy "Mirage" Young (voice)
- Babar (1989) - Madame (voice)
- Alfred Hitchcock Presents (1989)
- Street Legal (1989)
- Babar: The Movie (1989) - Queen Celeste, Lady (voice)
- The Legend of Zelda (1989) - Triforce of Wisdom (voice)
- Piggsburg Pigs! (1990)
- The Raccoons (1990) - Nicole Raccoon (voice)
- The Nutcracker Prince (1990) - Marie, Miss Schaeffer, Doll (voice)
- Beetlejuice (1989–91) - Delia Deetz, Miss Shannon (voice)
- Dog City (1992–95) - Rosie O'Gravy (voice)
- The Lawrencia Bembenek Story (1993) (Television Movie)
- Tales from the Cryptkeeper (1993–94) - The Old Witch (voice)
- Wild C.A.T.s (1994–95)
- Little Bear (1995–2001) - Hen (voice)
- The Magic School Bus (1995) - Judge (voice)
- Sailor Moon (1995) - Doom Tree/Tree of Life (voice)
- Franklin (1997–2004) - Duck, Mrs. Fox (voice)
- Mega Man Legends (1997) - Servbots (voice)
- Silver Surfer (1998) - Kill the Troll (voice)
- Babar: King of the Elephants (1999) - Madame (voice)
- The Misadventures of Tron Bonne (1999) - Servbot #1 (voice)
- Mythic Warriors: Guardians of the Legend (2000) - Artemis (voice)
- Mega Man Legends 2 (2000) - Servbots (voice)
- Franklin and the Green Knight: The Movie (2000) - Mrs. Fox, Eagle (voice)
- The Little Bear Movie (2001) - Hen (voice, uncredited)
- Elliot Moose (2001)
- Rolie Polie Olie (2003–2004) - Kindly Lady (voice)
- Care Bears: Big Wish Movie (2005) - Big Wish (voice)
- Friends and Heroes (2008–09) - Luciana (voice)
- The Dating Guy (2009) (TV Series)
- Mia and Me (2011–12) - Panthea (voice)
- Wishenpoof! (2018) - Grammie (voice)
- Corn & Peg (2019–20) - Miss Biscuit (voice)
