= Babar: The Movie =

- Canadian theatrical release poster
- Directed by: Alan Bunce
- Screenplay by: Peter Sauder; J.D. Smith; John de Klein; Raymond Jafelice; Alan Bunce
- Story by: Peter Sauder; Michael Hirsh; Patrick Loubert
- Based on: Babar characters by Jean and Laurent de Brunhoff
- Produced by: Michael Hirsh; Patrick Loubert; Clive A. Smith
- Starring: Gordon Pinsent; Elizabeth Hanna
- Edited by: Evan Landis
- Music by: Milan Kymlicka
- Production companies: Nelvana; Ellipse Programme; The Clifford Ross Company
- Distributed by: Astral Films (Canada); Forum Distribution (France)
- Release date: 28 July 1989
- Running time: 76 minutes
- Countries: Canada; France
- Language: English
- Box office: $1.3 million

Babar: The Movie is a 1989 animated adventure film based on the characters of Jean de Brunhoff's eponymous children's books. It serves as the season finale to the first season of the TV series, as the second season started airing shortly after.

The film is co-produced by Canadian animation studio Nelvana Limited and French animation studio Ellipse Programme in association with The Clifford Ross Company and distributed by Astral Films in Canada and New Line Cinema in the United States. It is the latter studio's second animated film after 1980's Hurray for Betty Boop.

== Plot ==
On the night of Elephantland's Victory Parade, Babar tells his four children the story of his first days as King of the elephants.

On his first day as king, he is asked to choose a name for Elephantland's Annual Parade. Babar promptly selects one, but is informed by Cornelius and Pompadour that the matter must be thoroughly examined by committee. Babar's cousin, Celeste, then interrupts to tell Babar that her home has been attacked by Rataxes, the rhinoceros lord, and his horde. The chancellors scoff and rebuff her, but Babar, partly to impress Celeste and a strong ruling ethic, orders an elephant army to be called up immediately to defeat the rhinos.

However, due to slow procedures and the cautiousness of his advisors, Babar learns that the muster will take at least three days. Not willing to wait any longer and feeling like he's not keeping his promise to Celeste, Babar tells his cousin Arthur to take care of his job as King while he ventures off on his own into a dangerous jungle. He finds Celeste's village on fire; the rhinos are taking the adult elephants as slaves so that they can work on building a rhino city. Babar tries to intervene, but is attacked, and Celeste is thrown down the town well.

When he regains consciousness by the next morning, Babar rescues Celeste out of the well, and they set off to rescue her mother, and the other pachyderms, from Rataxes' wrath. Along the way, they meet a monkey named Zephir, who gives them the location of Rataxes' lair. Babar and Celeste encounter Rataxes, who plans to invade Babar's kingdom by twilight. After an intense chase through the rhinos' hideout, Babar and Celeste are imprisoned. They both escape along with Zephir, and head back to Elephantland, where they find Rataxes' army camping outside the city.

Sneaking into the rhinos' camp, they disguise themselves as warriors, asking for "special detail" of their plans for attack, but are eventually discovered. They manage to escape on a catapult, landing in a fountain, much to the surprise of Babar's advisors.

Rataxes prepares to launch his attack and proclaims Elephantland will be destroyed in an hour. To buy time, Babar orders Cornelius and Pompadour to distract Rataxes with their "committee" procedure. The elephants, along with Babar, build a giant elephant float, which scares off Rataxes and his soldiers.

At sunrise, Babar's friends congratulate him on saving the day and his town, but are surprised to learn that their very first Victory Parade will be held during the afternoon. It has gone by that name ever since, the older Babar recalls, because the committee could not find any other name for it.

As Babar finishes his tale, he finds that his children have all gone to sleep. His children, once he closes the door, re-enact scenes from the story, until he tells them to go to sleep.

== Cast ==
- Gordon Pinsent - King Babar
- Elizabeth Hanna - Queen Celeste/The Old Lady
- Lisa Yamanaka - Isabelle
- Marsha Moreau - Flora
- Bobby Becken - Pom
- Amos Crawley - Alexander
- Gavin Magrath - Young Babar
- Sarah Polley - Young Celeste
- Stephen Ouimette - Pompadour
- Chris Wiggins - Cornelius
- John Stocker - Zephir
- Charles Kerr - Rataxes/Rhino Guards (uncredited for the latter)
- Stuart Stone - Young Arthur
- Carl Banas - Old Tusk
- Ray Landry - Croc
- Angela Fusco - Celeste's Mother
- Barbara Mantini - Bird/Elephant/Monkey
- Christopher Andrande - Additional Voices
- Christopher Britton - Additional Voices
- Scott Brunt - Additional Voices
- Jason Burke - Additional Voices
- Katie Coristine - Additional Voices
- Frank Perry - Additional Voices
- Chris Robson - Additional Voices
- Norm Spencer - Additional Voices
- Lea-Helen Weir - Additional Voices

== Release ==
In May 1989, the Toronto-based animation studio Nelvana announced that Babar: The Movie would debut in over 800 U.S. theatres by 28 July of that year. The film, however, opened at only 510 North American venues and grossed US$1,305,187; the Chicago Tribune deemed it a box-office flop, although the film did regain its losses through the home video release. Although a flop in the US and Canada, it was one of the top five grossing films in English Canada for the year with a gross of C$500,000. It was the last animated feature production by Nelvana until 1997's Pippi Longstocking, and another Babar film in 1999, Babar: King of the Elephants. It was released on DVD in 2004 by Artisan Entertainment, before the company was acquired by Lionsgate. Sometime afterwards, Lionsgate's rights to distribution of Nelvana's Babar library expired, and Entertainment One took over distribution rights and reissued the film on DVD in 2013.

A book adaptation of the movie, written by Cathy East Dubowski and illustrated by Renzo Barto, was published by Random House in November 1989.

== Soundtrack ==
The film features five main songs, performed by Molly Johnson, Judy Tate, The Nylons, and by cast members Stephen Ouimette, Chris Wiggins, and John Stocker.

The songs are (in order of appearance):

- "Elephantland March" - written by Maribeth Solomon; performed by The Nylons, Judy Tate, Debbie Fleming (as Debbie Flemming), John Rutledge, and Neil Donell.
- "The Committee Song" - written by Philip Balsam (credited as Phil Balsam); performed by Stephen Ouimette, Chris Wiggins, and The Nylons.
- "The Best We Both Can Be" - written by Maribeth Solomon; performed by Molly Johnson.
- "Monkey Business" - written by Maribeth Solomon; performed by John Stocker, Judy Tate, Debbie Fleming (as Debbie Flemming), John Rutledge, Neil Donell, and The Nylons.
- "Rataxes' Song" - written by Kevan Staples, Marvin Dolgay, and Carole Pope; performed by Charles Kerr.

== Reception ==
The film received mixed reviews from critics. Stephen Holden wrote in The New York Times:

Since the first Babar book was published more than 50 years ago in Paris, the adventures of the beneficent king of the elephants have been told in more than three dozen books that have sold over six million copies in the United States and Canada. The character is a likable paradigm of an enlightened ruler, royal in station but democratic in spirit.

But as beloved as Babar may be, he makes for a bland cartoon movie hero. And the story that has been concocted for the character's first animated feature film lacks a sharp allegorical resonance. The elephants are sweet, cute, gentle and smart; the rhinos are mean, ugly, fierce and stupid. Very little tension is generated. The movie is not especially handsome, with animation that has the flat, sparse look and jerky momentum of a Saturday-morning cartoon.

The voices for the cartoon characters also lack character and tend to be too squeaky. Among several songs in the score, the most prominent is a treacly ballad, The Best We Both Can Be, which sounds like a moppet-scale version of a Whitney Houston hit.

Sheila Benson of the Los Angeles Times wrote that "Babar's ingenuity in defeating Rataxes at Elephantland's very gates is, if memory serves, right from the book and thunderingly, ground-shakingly splendid. The film is also full of songs, mostly unmemorable, with the exception of a sprightly number in praise of red tape. It's done in razzmatazz style by two fussy courtiers, Cornelius and Pompadour, sung by their actors, Chris Wiggins and Stephen Ouimette, respectively, and written by Phil Balsam. If more of 'Babar' hit this tone, it would be an enchantment. As it is, 'Babar: The Movie' is pleasant, occasionally delightful and certainly a safe niche for the young 'uns." David Robinson of The Times in London said that the film "is very loyal to the spirit and elegant minimalist graphic style of the original. The appeal of the story is strictly for the youngest audience; though it is nice to know that the film is helping to raise money to save real-life elephants."

The movie does not have a sufficient amount of reviews to generate a score on Rotten Tomatoes.
