= Arkon =

Arkon the Magnificent
- Arkon the Magnificent. Textless variant cover of Weirdworld #1 (June 2015). Art by Steve Epting.

Publication information
- Publisher: Marvel Comics
- First appearance: The Avengers #75 (April 1970)
- Created by: Roy Thomas (writer); John Buscema (artist)

In-story information
- Full name: Arkon the Magnificent
- Species: Polemachian
- Partnerships: Enchantress
- Notable aliases: Arkon the Imperion; Lord of Warlords
- Abilities: Superhuman strength, speed, agility, stamina, durability and reflexes; Accelerated healing factor; Possesses three lightning-shaped energy weapons and a shield; Extraordinary hand-to-hand combatant and swordsman; Rides on various dinosaur-like mounts; Highly skilled with throwing weapons; Cunning military strategist

Arkon is a character appearing in American comic books published by Marvel Comics. Created by writer Roy Thomas and artist John Buscema, the character first appeared in The Avengers #75 (April 1970). He is the warlord and ruler of the extra-dimensional world of Polemachus.

== Development ==
=== Concept and creation ===
The concept of the character is that he is a hero from the sword-and-sorcery genre, in a world of modern superheroes. During an interview with co-creator John Buscema, Roy Thomas recalled, "We introduced another one of our more popular creations, Arkon the Magnificent. He had the feel of Edgar Rice Burroughs' John Carter of Mars crossed with Conan."

=== Publication history ===
Arkon debuted in The Avengers #75 (April 1970), and was created by Roy Thomas and John Buscema.

== Fictional character biography ==
Arkon was born of noble lineage on the extra-dimensional world Polemachus. The people of the Realm of Polemachus developed a culture that glorifies warfare, and Arkon succeeded in becoming the greatest warrior of his people. Appointed Imperion (ruler) of the largest country on Polemachus, Arkon launches military campaigns against neighboring countries in an effort to conquer the world. However, Polemachus is faced with a worldwide catastrophe when its rings, which provide light and heat, begin disintegrating. Arkon's scientists determine that atomic explosions occurring on Earth were affecting the energy rings. The scientists do not have nuclear technology equivalent to Earth, but still intend to annihilate Earth to restore their world's rings to power.

Arkon manipulates Scarlet Witch into reciting a spell to transport Arkon to Earth. Attracted to the Scarlet Witch and intending to marry her, Arkon kidnaps her and a group of atomic scientists, forcing them to construct an atomic device. Before Arkon can detonate the device on Earth, the Avengers intervene. Iron Man and Thor rekindle Polemachus' energy-rings via a super device devised by Iron Man, resulting in Arkon ceasing hostilities with Earth.

Although his world now possesses the capacity for atomic weapons, Arkon is dissatisfied with the length of time it took to build a nuclear arsenal. Thus, he devises a plan to pit three extra-dimensional worlds, one of which is Earth, against one another, in hopes that the energy from the resultant nuclear conflagration would be absorbed by Polemachus. His plan fails due to the efforts of the Fantastic Four.

Arkon is forced to return to Earth after inadvertently causing the machine that Iron Man built to rekindle Polemachus' rings to fail. Initially intending to recruit Thor, Arkon instead settles for Storm, who possesses similar electrical abilities. Storm and Cyclops help re-energize the energy ring; in exchange, Arkon returns Storm and her allies to Earth. Another time, the X-Men and the Fantastic Four help Arkon drive off an invasion of Polemachus by the alien Badoon. Arkon and Storm confessed their mutual attraction for each other, but decline to pursue their relationship further.

Some time later, Arkon travels to Earth to employ the Avengers West Coast and Fantastic Four as pawns in his war with Thundra. However, he makes peace with Thundra after realizing that they share a strong mutual attraction. Later, with Thundra as his consort, Arkon seeks the Avengers' aid in repairing Polemachus' energy ring and protecting the maiden Astra from being sacrificed to Polemachus' religious zealots.

During the Secret Wars storyline, Arkon finds himself in Weirdworld, part of Battleworld. After many failed attempts to return to Polemachus, Arkon finally arrives at the end of Weirdworld and finds that it is a floating island. However, he begins losing all memory of his home. Arkon found himself yet again in front of a cliff at the end of Weirdworld. Filled with sadness and rage, Arkon tries to kill himself, not knowing that Polemachus is the underside of Weirdworld. At the last minute, Arkon gives up on killing himself, intending to conquer Weirdworld instead. After being attacked by Morgaine le Fay, Arkon falls from Weirdworld and sees that Polemachus is part of it. After Battleworld is destroyed, Weirdworld ends up on Earth-616; Arkon resumes his journey to find Polemachus.

In All-New, All-Different Marvel, Arkon is still searching for Polemachus and comes across the survivors of an airplane that crash-landed onto Weirdworld. When Arkon is sighted on Earth, Thundra and Tyndall arrive to look for help in finding him. When the Squadron Supreme, Tyndall, and Thundra end up on Weirdworld, they are ambushed by Arkon. It is revealed that Arkon has been possessed by an evil madness as he assists Modred and Warrior Woman in taking down Nighthawk, Blur, and Tyndall.

== Powers and abilities ==
Arkon possesses a range of superhuman abilities, including superhuman strength, speed, stamina, agility, reflexes, and durability. He also has an accelerated healing factor, enabling him to rapidly heal damaged tissue should he sustain injury. While all of his people possess these same physical attributes, Arkon's are much more developed than the majority of his race.

He is a cunning military strategist. He is an extraordinary hand-to-hand combatant and swordsman, and is highly skilled in the usage of his throwing weapons, which were designed by the scientists and craftsmen of Polemachus. Arkon wields a collection of three energy weapons shaped like stylized lightning bolts that he carries in a quiver. Each of these bolts has a specific function and color. The golden bolts are used to open gateways to different dimensional planes. The scarlet and black bolts are used as offensive weapons and generate powerful explosive blasts when they hit their target. He also carries a shield.

Arkon has been known to ride dinosaur-like reptilian mounts, some of which walk on two legs and others on four. Other reptilian mounts he uses have wings enabling them to carry him through the air.

== Reception ==
Journalists of Comic Book Resources expressed interest in seeing a movie after Arkon exploring his relationship with Thundra in the Weirdworld.

== Other versions ==
On Earth-65, Arkon is a character in a tabletop roleplaying game.

== In other media ==
=== Television ===
Arkon as depicted in X-Men: The Animated Series

- Arkon appears in the X-Men: The Animated Series episode "Storm Front", voiced by Paul Haddad. This version is a conqueror and slaver who posed as an innocent man.
- Arkon appears in the Hulk and the Agents of S.M.A.S.H. episode "The Hunted", voiced by Liam O'Brien. This version is an evil hunter.

=== Video games ===
Arkon appears as a playable character in Lego Marvel Avengers.
