= Paul Haddad =

Canadian actor (1963–2020)

- Born: May 20, 1963; Birmingham, England, UK
- Died: April 11, 2020 (aged 56); Toronto, Ontario, Canada
- Education: McGill University
- Occupation: Actor
- Years active: 1986–2009; 2019

Paul Haddad (May 20, 1963 – April 11, 2020) was a Canadian actor. He was the original voice actor of Leon S. Kennedy in the Resident Evil franchise, voicing the character in Resident Evil 2 (1998). Other voice over roles included Uncle Arthur in Babar (1989–1991), Quicksilver and Arkon in X-Men: The Animated Series (1992–1996), Luke Talbot in Monster Force (1994), the title character in Free Willy (1994–1995), and Lefty in John Callahan's Quads! (2000–2002).

== Early life ==
Haddad was born in Birmingham, England on May 20, 1963. He was the eldest of three children. Haddad attended McGill University, where he studied acting. In 1988, he graduated from the National Theatre School of Canada, in Montreal, Quebec.

== Career ==
Haddad performed in the Stratford Theatre Festival in Stratford, Ontario for two years. In the 1996 festival, he played Bassanio in The Merchant of Venice.

Haddad voiced Uncle Arthur in Babar (1989–1991) and Shrimplips in Medabots (2001–2002).

Haddad's voice roles include Quads, Mythic Warriors, Cyberchase, The Adventures of Super Mario Bros. 3, Super Mario World, Little Bear, The Magic School Bus, RoboRoach, Pearlie, Franny's Feet, The Adventures of Tintin and Rupert.

In 1995, Haddad played Gerald Schulze, Edward Schulze's (Matt Frewer) brother who runs the local market in the DisneyToon Studios animated comedy film BugHunt.

He voiced Willy Stop in the animated series Rescue Heroes.

Haddad was best known for voicing Leon S. Kennedy in the video game Resident Evil 2. Due to the popularity of his voice work in Resident Evil 2, Haddad was asked to voice a character in the similarly themed Daymare: 1998. Haddad's role in Resident Evil 2 led to him becoming an "icon" among the game's fanbase according to Gamasutra.

== Personal life and death ==
Haddad resided in Toronto, Ontario until his death. His hobbies included film editing (often with videos of his dog) and assisting with actor demos. He revealed during a YouTube livestream he had stage three throat cancer and had a tumor growing on one of his vocal cords; however, the tumor was surgically removed, altering his voice in the process.

In February 2020, Haddad set up a GoFundMe requesting $2,000 for his third neurosurgery. He detailed his personal and financial struggles in a complementing Facebook post, which revealed he had obsessive–compulsive disorder (OCD) for most of his life. Although Haddad had been managing the disorder through a deep brain stimulation (DBS) device, the device was removed in 2019 due to an infection, causing his battle with OCD to resume.

Two months after creating the fundraiser, Haddad died on April 11, 2020, at the age of 56. The cause of death was not publicly disclosed.

== Filmography ==
=== Film ===
Year	Title	Role	Notes
1987	Tomorrow's a Killer	Lover	
1995	BugHunt	Gerald Schulze (voice)	
1996	An Angel for Christmas	Additional Voices (voice)	Direct-to-video
1999	Babar: King of the Elephants	Elevator Boy, Tailor (voices)	
2000	Franklin and the Green Knight: The Movie	Mr. Fox (voice)	Direct-to-video
2002	Rolie Polie Olie: The Great Defender of Fun	Willy Jollie (voice)	Direct-to-video
2003	Back to School with Franklin	Mr. Fox (voice)	Direct-to-video
2003	Rolie Polie Olie: The Baby Bot Chase	Gloomius Maximus, Wally Jolly (voices)	Direct-to-video; Replacing James Woods
2004	Childstar	Wedge Executive	

=== Television ===
Year	Title	Role	Notes
1986	Night Heat	Julian Tobias	Episode: "Fighting Back"
1987	American Playhouse	The Triumphant Egghead	Episode: "The Prodigious Hickey"
1989–1991	Babar	Uncle Arthur (voice)	39 episodes
1990	The Adventures of Super Mario Bros. 3	Additional Voices (voice)	26 episodes
1991	MacGyver	Nikolai Rostov	Episode: "Jerico Games"
1992–1996	X-Men	Quicksilver/Pietro Maximoff, Arkon, Kiyoek, Various (voices)	17 episodes
1993	E.N.G.	Roger Quigley	Episode: "Love and Marriage"
1994	Free Willy	Willy the Orca (voice)	21 episodes
1996	Any Mother's Son	John Miller	TV film
1998–2000	Flying Rhino Junior High	Buford, Mr. Needlenose (voices)	26 episodes
1999	Mythic Warriors	Theseus, Fisherman (voices)	Episode: "Theseus and the Minotaur"
2000–2002	John Callahan's Quads!	Lefty (voice)	26 episodes
2001–2002	Medabots	Shrimplips, Calamari, Various (voices)	Seasons: 1–2
2001–2002	Rescue Heroes	Willy Stop (voice)	Episodes: "Mayhem in the Mist" and "Blackout"
2002–2004	Rolie Polie Olie	Gloomius Maximus (voice)	Season 6 only
2004–2010	Franny's Feet	Additional Voices (voice)	11 episodes
2009	Murdoch Mysteries	Morris Bailey	Episode: "Snakes and Ladders"

=== Video games ===
Year	Title	Role	Notes
1998	Resident Evil 2	Leon S. Kennedy	
2019	Daymare: 1998	Cleaner	Final role
