= Tales from the Cryptkeeper =

Animated children's horror television series

- Genre: Comedy horror; Fantasy; Science fiction; Children's horror
- Based on: Tales from the Crypt by EC Comics
- Developed by: Libby Hinson; Ben Joseph
- Written by: Peter Sauder
- Directed by: Laura Shepherd
- Voices of: John Kassir; Elizabeth Hanna; David Hemblen; Luca Perlman; Asia Vieira; Daniel DeSanto; Tara Strong; Kevin Zegers; Kristen Bone; Noah Reid; Nathaniel Siegler; Lisa Yamanaka; Harvey Atkin; Janet-Laine Green; William Colgate
- Theme music composer: Heart Times Coffee Cup Equals Lightning
- Composer: Amin Bhatia
- Countries of origin: United States; Canada; France (season 3)
- Original language: English
- No. of seasons: 3
- No. of episodes: 39

Production
- Executive producers: Joel Silver; Richard Donner; David Giler; Walter Hill; Robert Zemeckis
- Producers: Michael Hirsh; Patrick Loubert; Patricia R. Burns
- Editor: Rick Hickson
- Running time: 22 minutes
- Production companies: Nelvana; Fantome Animation (season 3)

Original release
- Network: Teletoon (Canada); ABC (United States, seasons 1–2); CBS (United States, season 3); M6 (France, season 3)
- Release: September 18, 1993 – December 4, 1999

Related
- Tales from the Crypt (1989–1996)

Tales from the Cryptkeeper is an animated children's horror television series made by Canada-based studio Nelvana. The series was broadcast on ABC in the United States, and on ITV in the United Kingdom. It is based on the 1950s EC Comics series Tales from the Crypt and the live-action television series of the same name, which aired concurrently on HBO. Intended for children, Tales from the Cryptkeeper was significantly milder than its live-action counterpart, and all blood, gore, profanity and sexual content were completely removed in order to be more appropriate for the target audience. Most episodes take place within the fictional city of Gravenhurst, California. (Note: Population: 55,232. This name is given in the tenth episode "The Gorilla's Paw", the same buildings which are shown in this episode are also seen in many other episodes in the series, and many of the characters speak with very obvious California accents.)

The series was cancelled on December 10, 1994, and returned to the air in 1999 as New Tales from the Cryptkeeper. The animation differed from previous episodes, and it transferred to Teletoon in Canada and to CBS in the United States. All three seasons are available to stream on Nelvana's "Retro ReRun" YouTube channel, and are in rotation on Pluto TV.

== Plot ==
The series details the Cryptkeeper telling more kid-friendly horror stories to the viewers, each with a teachable lesson.

The second season has the Cryptkeeper at constant odds with rivals, and fellow EC Comics horror hosts, the Vault-Keeper and the Old Witch, who continually try to steal the show from him as they did not have one of their own, only to have their plans backfire. The Cryptkeeper can be found in different locales than his mansion, as he tries to elude his foes.

The third and final season, under the title New Tales from the Cryptkeeper, aired in 1999 on Teletoon in Canada and on CBS in the United States. This season sees the Cryptkeeper taking a more active role, usually by setting up situations to teach frightening lessons to kids with severe character flaws.

== Cast ==
- John Kassir as The Cryptkeeper
- Elizabeth Hanna as The Old Witch
- David Hemblen as The Vault Keeper
- Luca Perlman as Ralph
- Asia Vieira as Erin
- Daniel DeSanto as Dwight / Jimmy and Rob
- Tara Strong as Jenny
- Kevin Zegers as Jeremy / 6X
- Kristen Bone as Katie / Sharon Sharalike
- Noah Reid as Steven
- Nathaniel Siegler as Randall
- Lisa Yamanaka as Becky
- Janet-Laine Green as Beth, Erin's Mom
- Harvey Atkin as Uncle Harry / Harold Klump
- William Colgate as Professor Perry
- Diane Fabian as Aunt Dorothy
- Benedict Campbell as Lusus
- Michael Barry as Wendell
- Maia Filar as Julia
- Stephanie Morgenstern as June
- Bryn McAuley as Karen
- Amos Crawley as Eddie / Pete
- Andrew Sabiston as Louis / Head Counselor Bill and Dale
- Rob Stefaniuk as Ben / Chet
- Hadley Kay as Herman
- Frances Hyland as Aunt Melba
- Thor Bishopric as Kevin
- Tabitha St. Germain as Rose's Mom / Sally and Zola
- Marc Donato as David
- Tyrone Savage as Evan
- Zachary Bennett as Buddy
- Kyle Downes as Brock
- Miklos Perlus as Vince
- Brooke Nevin as Jan
- Alyson Court as Kirsten
- Robert Tinkler as Anthrax / Blob
- Valentina Cardinalli as Camille
- Marsha Moreau as Mildred
- Stuart Stone as The Boy / Sheldon / Boy with Dog / Itchy and Craig
- Tara Meyer as Stephanie / Rose
- Jon-Erik Laggano as Leo
- Kevin Duhaney as Jamie
- Terri Hawkes as Katie
- Ari Magder as Randy
- Jeannie Diggins as Mary Anne
- Tracy Ryan as Shauna
- Jamie Haydon-Devilin as Dale / Poindexter
- David Deveau as Gary
- Dominic Zamprogna as Peter / Simon / Kid and Vincent
- Mairon Bennett as Naomi
- Daniel Stemer as Arnold
- Skyellar Pollack as Steve
- Noam Zylberman as Stu
- Elva Mai Hoover as Dr. Mahdi
- Jean Daigle as Ben
- Len Carlson as Injun Joe / Visitor Leader
- Kevin Hanchard as Mary Anne's Dad
- Rino Romano as Eddie
- Len Doncheff as Ed, Erin's Grandpa
- Don Francks as Red Beard / The Hunter / The Exterminator
- Stephen Ouimette as Chuck
- Roger Dunn as Mr. Purdy
- John Stocker as Melvin
- George Buza as William and Mr. Armstrong
- Linda Ballantyne as Jamie's Mom
- Richard Binsley as Mr. Feral
- Alexander Trinskey as Tumorman

== Episodes ==
=== Series overview ===
Season	Episodes	Originally released		
Season	Episodes	First released	Last released	Network
1	13	September 18, 1993	December 18, 1993	ABC
2	13	September 10, 1994	December 10, 1994	ABC
3	13	September 11, 1999	December 4, 1999	CBS

=== Season 1 (1993) ===
No. overall	No. in season	Title	Written by	Original ABC air date
1	1	"While the Cat's Away"	Manny Coto	September 18, 1993
Two brothers plan to rob an abandoned mansion, where The Cryptkeeper has set up a monstrous security system to get rid of intruders.: Based on "While The Cat's Away..." from The Vault of Horror #34.
2	2	"Nature"	Juan Carlos Coto	September 25, 1993
After two brothers torment ants at a picnic, they are shrunk by a mysterious ray and are forced to face the trials and tribulations of the insect world.: The Cryptkeeper makes a cameo on a penny; he is wearing a hat and a beard making him resemble Abraham Lincoln.
3	3	"Pleasant Screams"	James Thomton	October 2, 1993
Strict teacher Felix Purdy has always been tough on his students, particularly on introverted dreamer Daryl Kregman. All Daryl wants is to transfer into a creative writing class, but Purdy refuses; no one has ever transferred out of his class. Purdy begins to have second thoughts when he is troubled by a series of nightmares which place him - and Jenny - in the middle of all kinds of spine-tingling action.: The Cryptkeeper makes a cameo on a box of matches.; Based on "Pleasant Screams!" from Tales from the Crypt #37.
4	4	"Gone Fishin"	Terry Black David Hines and Jeff Hause	October 9, 1993
4	4	"A Little Body of Work"	Terry Black David Hines and Jeff Hause	October 9, 1993
Gone Fishin: A boy tries to warn his uncle, a wasteful fisherman, of the fish that are out for revenge.: The Cryptkeeper makes a cameo at the end holding a can of the boy's uncle.; Based on "Gone... Fishing!" from The Vault of Horror #22.; A Little Body of Work: Two hoodlums challenge a boy to a race on the Mustang he's renovating. A car which, unbeknownst to them, has a mind of its own.: The Cryptkeeper makes a cameo dressed as a diner waitress.
5	5	"The Works.... In Wax"	Eric Luke	October 16, 1993
A boy discovers that statues in his favorite wax museum come to life.: The Cryptkeeper makes a cameo dressed as a wax mannequin of Marie Antoinette.; Based on "The Works... In Wax!" from Tales from the Crypt #25.
6	6	"The Sleeping Beauty"	Edithe Swenson and David Finley	October 23, 1993
In a terrifying retelling of the classic fairytale, a self-absorbed prince named Chuck Charming and his nerdy put-upon twin brother Melvin go on a quest to wake the Sleeping Beauty, the slumbering princess, who, unbeknownst to them, is really a bloodthirsty vampire.: Based on "The Sleeping Beauty!" from Tales from the Crypt #39.
7	7	"Cave Man"	Ed Naha	October 30, 1993
Peter, the son of a scientist befriends a Neanderthal caveman that has been encased in ice for millions of years after Peter accidentally defrosts him. But trouble starts to rise when the caveman has a hard time adapting to the modern world when the two go to the amusement park for Peter’s birthday.: The Cryptkeeper makes a cameo dressed as a ticket salesman.; Based on "Cave Man" from The Crypt of Terror #19.
8	8	"Hyde and Go Shriek"	Dana Olsen	November 6, 1993
A group of bullies fear for their lives when their victim Wendell drinks a potion that turns him into a werewolf.: The Cryptkeeper makes a cameo on the box of the magic potion.
9	9	"Fare Tonight"	David Finley	November 13, 1993
Two girl paranormal enthusiasts, Mildred and Camille, create a homemade vampire detector and use it to hunt for bloodsuckers...only to learn that one of them is right under their nose.: The Cryptkeeper makes a cameo as a bar patron.; Based on "Fare Tonight, Followed By Increasing Clottyness..." from Tales from the Crypt #36.
10	10	"Gorilla's Paw"	James Thomton	November 20, 1993
In a classic retelling of W. W. Jacobs' The Monkey's Paw, an unpopular kid steals a gorilla's paw in order to be a part of a secret club, and discovers that the gorilla's paw can grant wishes with twisted results.: The Cryptkeeper makes a cameo as the host of television program Gruesome Gladiators.; Based on "The Gorilla's Paw!" from The Haunt of Fear #9.
11	11	"This Wraps It Up"	Peter Sauder	December 4, 1993
During a class trip to an Egyptian pyramid, a tall girl named Naomi who keeps getting bullied because of her height must save her classmates from a mummy's curse.: The Cryptkeeper makes a cameo on top of a tomb entrance.; Based on "This Wraps It Up!" from Tales from the Crypt #35.
12	12	"Grounds for Horror"	Ed Naha	December 11, 1993
Summer campers befriend an invisible being who plays pranks on a strict, no-nonsense counselor.: Based on "Grounds... For Horror!" from Tales from the Crypt #29.
13	13	"Ghost Ship"	Peter Sauder and Eric Luke	December 18, 1993
Ben and his friend Mike go for a joyride on Ben's father's new yacht and sink it, leaving the two stranded in the ocean until a phantom ship haunted by pirates comes to their rescue.: Based on "Ghost Ship!" from The Crypt of Terror #19.

=== Season 2 (1994) ===
No. overall	No. in season	Title	Written by	Original ABC air date
14	1	"Game Over"	Peter Sauder	September 10, 1994
Two boys pay for skipping school to play video games when the characters come to life.
15a	2a	"Cold Blood, Warm Hearts"	John de Klein & Erika Strobel	September 17, 1994
The Cryptkeeper and the Old Witch meet at the beach to swap stories: The old witch tells a story of a woman and a man where find out that they have a lot in common while investigating rumors of a sea monster dwelling in an ocean.
15b	2b	"The Spider and the Flies"	Eric Luke	September 17, 1994
The Cryptkeeper and the Old Witch meet at the beach to swap stories: The cryptkeeper tells a story where spiders infest a town. Two siblings find out that a mysterious exterminator is not what he seems to be.
16a	3a	"The Avenging Phantom"	Eric Luke	September 24, 1994
After besting the Vaultkeeper in shadow puppets, the Cryptkeeper tells two stories. A young boy named Jimmy wishes he can get revenge on his tormentors like his comic book superhero "The Avenging Phantom" and gets his wish, but with dire consequences.
16b	3b	"Myth Conceptions"	John de Klein (story); Vince Grittani (teleplay)	September 24, 1994
An archaeologist discovers the tomb of Medusa and learns the hard way why others before him have died trying to find it.
17	4	"All the Gory Details!"	Erika Strobel	October 1, 1994
A pair of newspaper reporters try to track down an old mad scientist.
18	5	"The Weeping Woman"	John de Klein (story); Libby Hinson (teleplay)	October 8, 1994
Camille and Mildred from "Fare Tonight" are back, this time investigate the sightings of the ghost of a woman who haunts a local inn.
19	6	"Dead Men Don't Jump!"	Eric Luke	October 15, 1994
The Old Witch, The Cryptkeeper, and The Vaultkeeper return and compete to decide who tells one story. When the Old Witch wins thanks to her magic, she tells the tale of a boy who challenges a demon to a basketball game that could mean the end of his life if he loses.
20	7	"The Haunted Mine"	John de Klein (story); Eric Luke (teleplay)	October 22, 1994
After incapacitating Scariff Cryptkeeper in a ghost town, the Vaultkeeper tells the story about a young man who goes to visit his aunt which leads to a trip inside an abandoned mine filled with unusual shapes and a dark secret.
21	8	"Growing Pains"	Libby Hinson	October 29, 1994
The Old Witch takes over telling another story after turning the Cryptkeeper into a scarecrow. Wendell from "Hyde and Go Shriek" is back and he falls for a new girl named Rose at school with a rather "weedy" family secret.
22	9	"The Brothers Gruff"	Peter Sauder	November 5, 1994
A boy named Eddie is followed home by a troll after crossing a bridge. Now it's up to him and his friend Sheldon, who knows almost everything about monsters, to defeat the troll when it kidnaps Eddie's older brother.
23	10	"Uncle Harry's Horrible House of Horrors"	Erika Strobel	November 12, 1994
During a trip to the carnival, a boy's birthday is being spoiled by his skeptical uncle, but the latter of whom soon has his views of the supernatural challenged when they take a ride through a frighteningly realistic haunted house.
24	11	"Hunted"	Peter Sauder	November 19, 1994
A heartless hunter in the Amazon is soon the hunted when a shapeshifting monster named Onnaya starts pursuing him after freeing the captured animals.
25	12	"Chuck (and Melvin) and the Beanstalker"	David Finley	December 3, 1994
Chuck and Melvin from "The Sleeping Beauty" return as they must steal the treasure of a giant Cyclops named Beanstalker.
26	13	"Transylvania Express"	Peter Sauder	December 10, 1994
Two surfer dudes, none other than Mike and Ben from "Ghost Ship" are back and accidentally get on a train headed for Transylvania, where they must fight back against vampires.

=== Season 3: New Tales from the Cryptkeeper (1999) ===
No. overall	No. in season	Title	Written by	Original CBS air date
27	1	"Sharon Sharalike"	J.D. Smith	September 11, 1999
Thirteen-year-old girl Shauna is selfish and does not like to share with her five-year-old sister Katie. When their father, who is in New York City, sends them a doll as a gift, Shauna steals it for herself. Soon, she learns that the doll does not like it when its owners don't share.
28	2	"Imaginary Friend"	Kim Thompson	September 18, 1999
Two teen boys, Leo and Jamie, torment eight-year-old girl Mary-Anne. But Mary-Anne has an imaginary friend who gets back at the boys for their actions.
29	3	"Waste Not, Haunt Not"	Peter Sauder	September 25, 1999
Two boys named Steven and Richard improperly dispose of toxic waste from their science project into a bog, which creates a bog monster.
30	4	"Unpopular Mechanics"	Peter Sauder	October 2, 1999
Randall "The Vandal" is a kid inventor who has a gift for mechanics, but uses his talent for destructive pranks. When he invents a remote control that can cause machines to go haywire, he gets his comeuppance when the appliances say "No more!" and attack him.
31	5	"Competitive Spirit"	J.D. Smith	October 9, 1999
Vincent tricks his rival into thinking a ghost exists in the mountains, but a real mountain spirit comes after the boy for his deceptive ways.
32	6	"Trouble in Store"	J.D. Smith	October 16, 1999
Two boys named Rob and Derek who are known for stealing end up getting locked in a store during closing hours. They discover that the mannequins don't take kindly to those who steal from their "home".
33	7	"So Very Attractive"	John de Klein (story); Ben Joseph and J.D. Smith (teleplay)	October 23, 1999
An insecure fourteen-year-old girl named Julia buys a beauty cream from an abandoned drugstore that makes her an irresistible force to everything... including animals and the dead.
34	8	"Drawn and Quartered"	J.D. Smith	October 30, 1999
An aspiring artist named Ralph finds a magic pencil that brings his drawings to life whenever he draws with it, especially his cartoon character named "Wahoo". He vows to get back at the bullies who torment him by having him torment them back. He then learns that two wrongs don't make a right after things go over-the-top.: Based on "Drawn and Quartered!" from Tales from the Crypt #26
35	9	"All Booked Up"	Deborah Goodwin and J.D. Smith	November 6, 1999
A thirteen-year-old boy named Greg Davis hates to read books and wants nothing to do with them. One day, he and his class get assigned to write a book report on one of them given to him and he gets trapped in a library. Thanks to the Cryptkeeper, he gets sucked inside a book that takes him on a journey to the dark world of classic literatures such as Frankenstein, The Man in the Iron Mask, and Tom Sawyer.
36	10	"Town Gathering"	J.D. Smith	November 13, 1999
A fourteen-year-old girl named Erin who is known for her pranks must convince her mother that a group of businessmen are actually aliens bent on eating the townspeople.
37	11	"It's for You"	J.D. Smith	November 20, 1999
A fourteen-year-old boy named Gary gets his own phone line as a Christmas present that he wanted for a long time. However, he abuses his privilege and goes against his parents' wishes by making several prank calls after he made an agreement with them saying he wouldn't. The problem gets worse when he accidentally makes a prank call to a mysterious old woman who begins to stalk him over the phone.
38	12	"Monsters Ate My Homework"	J.D. Smith	November 27, 1999
A boy named Evan lies to his teacher by saying that monsters ate his homework in order to avoid getting into trouble. All goes well until problems escalate when real monsters actually come after Evan by coming out under his bed and they want to go after his homework.
39	13	"Too Cool for School"	John de Klein (story); Erika Strobel (teleplay)	December 4, 1999
Two girls, Stephanie and Jan, hate following rules. One day, they mess around with the objects in the school science lab and inadvertently create some half-dinosaur/frog creatures after refusing to clean up frog eggs and a serum containing dinosaur DNA off the floor. After the situation gets more haywire, they then learn the hard way that it's important to obey rules.

== Syndication ==
In North America, the series premiered on ABC, but was later broadcast on Teletoon and CBS. In August 2012, Fearnet aired reruns during their weekend Funhouse block. Spanish-dubbed episodes of the series aired on Telefutura, as part of the Toonturama block on Saturday and Sunday mornings as Cuentos de la Cripta from 2002 to 2005.

In October 2021, the live streaming television Filmrise Kids began airing the whole series every day.

Outside of North America, the series aired on Canal+ and M6 in France, Kindernet in the Netherlands, and ITV in the United Kingdom.

== Home media ==
Name	Release date	Episodes	Region	Additional information
Stacks of Fear	September 28, 2004	3	1	Includes Season 3 episodes: All Booked Up, Town Gathering and Unpopular Mechanics. Bonus feature includes: Stay Safe Halloween Tips and trailers.
Pleasant Screams: The Complete First Season	September 18, 2007	13	1	Includes the complete first season.
All the Gory Details: The Complete Second Season	September 16, 2008	13	1	Includes the complete second season.
Myth Conceptions	September 10, 2013	6	1	Includes the first six Season 2 episodes: Game Over, Cold Blood, Warm Hearts/The Spider and the Flies, The Avenging Phantom/Myth Conceptions, All the Gory Details!, The Weeping Woman and Dead Men Don't Jump! Also released under the title "Myth Conception" with a different cover.
Transylvania Express	September 10, 2013	7	1	Includes the last seven Season 2 episodes: The Haunted Mine, Growing Pains, The Brothers Gruff, Uncle Harry's Horrible House of Horrors, Hunted, Chuck (and Melvin) and the Beanstalker and Transylvania Express.
Season 1	2014	13	1	Includes the repackaged complete first season.
Tales from the Cryptkeeper: The Complete Series	2024	39	4	Includes the complete 39 episodes from all three seasons on six discs.
