= Dan Lett =

Canadian actor (born 1959)

Daniel Frederick Lett (born April 16, 1959) is a Canadian actor. He has acted in films, theatre and television. His principal roles have been in the series F/X, The X-Files, E.N.G., Street Legal, Wind at My Back, and Made in Canada.

Lett is a three-time Gemini Award winner.

== Partial filmography ==
- Mrs. Soffel (1984) – Young Man (uncredited)
- The Suicide Murders (1985, TV Movie) – Buddy
- Big Deal (1985) – Bob Bowers
- Blue Monkey (1987) – Ted Andrews
- The Women of Windsor (1992, TV Movie) – Assistant Press Secretary
- Paris, France (1993) - William / Michael's partner
- The X-Files (1993, TV Series) - Sir Malcolm Marsden
- Due South (1994–98, TV Series) - Carver Dunn / Dr. Weingarten
- Butterbox Babies (1995) - Robertson
- Choices of the Heart: The Margaret Sanger Story (1995, TV Movie) - Reporter #2
- Goosebumps (1995, TV Series) - Mr. Dark
- Sugartime (1995, TV Movie) - Maitre 'd
- Net Worth (1995, TV Movie) - Bruce Norris
- Little Bear (1995, TV Series) - Rusty Bear
- No One Could Protect Her (1996) - Nick Foster
- Lives of Girls and Women (1996, TV Movie) - Art Chamberlain
- Conundrum (1996, TV Movie) - Jimmy Khang
- Under the Piano (1996, TV Movie) - Dr. Harkness
- Dinner Along the Amazon (1996, TV Short) - Michael Penney
- A Prayer in the Dark (1997, TV Movie) - Herb Hill
- Double Take (1997) - Detective Hardaway
- The Planet of Junior Brown (1997) - Mr. Roundtree
- Hayseed (1997) – Liam Burbage
- Blind Faith (1998) - Frank Minor
- My Date with the President's Daughter (1998, TV Series) - Agent McKible
- Thanks of a Grateful Nation (1998, TV Movie) - Dr. Lucifer
- Made in Canada (1998–2003, TV Series) - Victor Sela
- Babar: King of the Elephants (1999) - King Babar (voice)
- Dead Aviators (1999, TV Movie) - Mr. Frears
- Strange Justice (1999, TV Movie) - Gil Middledrook
- The Life Before This (1999) - Sam
- The Secret Laughter of Women (1999) - John
- Anne of Green Gables: the Continuing Story (2000, TV Mini-Series) - Water Owen
- Songs in Ordinary Time (2000, TV Movie) - Briscoe
- Babar (2001, TV Series) - King Babar
- Get a Clue (2002, TV Movie) - Frank Gold
- Queer As Folk (2002–03, TV Series) - Garth Racine
- Penguins Behind Bars1 (2003, TV Short) - District Attourney / Judge (voice)
- The Reagans (2003, TV Movie) - Robert H. Tuttle
- Cavedweller (2004) - Reverend Hillman
- The Prize Winner of Defiance, Ohio (2005) - Detective Feeney
- You Might as Well Live (2009) - J. Amberson De Whitt
- Pure Pwnage (2010, TV Series) - Narrator (voice)
- Babar and the Adventures of Badou (2010–11, TV Series) - Pom (voice)
- Cubicle Warriors (2013) - Dick Wadkins
- Maps to the Stars (2014) - Talkshow Host
- Born to Be Blue (2015) - Danny Friedman
- Beeba Boys (2015) - Blonski
- X-Men: Apocalypse (2016) - Defense Secretary Weisberg
- The Meaning of Life (2017) - Finn's Dad
- The Shape of Water (2017) - Cadillac Salesman
- Molly's Game (2017) - David Sagen
- Mysticons (2017, TV Series) - Nova Terron (voice)
- Georgetown (2019) - Robert Pearson
- Disappearance at Clifton Hill (2019) - Randy
- Feel the Beat (2020) - Burt Davenport (Announcer)
- I Was Lorena Bobbitt (2021) - Paul Ebert
- Sharp Corner (2024) - David Chapman
