= Daymare: 1994 Sandcastle =

2023 video game

- Developer: Invader Studios
- Publisher: Leonardo Interactive
- Engine: Unreal Engine 4
- Platforms: PlayStation 4; PlayStation 5; Windows; Xbox One; Xbox Series X/S; Nintendo Switch
- Release: WW: August 30, 2023
- Genre: Survival horror
- Mode: Single-player

Daymare: 1994 Sandcastle is a 2023 survival horror game developed by Invader Studios and published by Leonardo Interactive.

== Gameplay ==
In 1994, Area 51 loses contact with the outside world. Players control an agent sent to investigate. Daymare: 1994 Sandcastle is a prequel to Daymare: 1998 and is an action-oriented horror game played from a third-person view. Players engage in frequent combat with monsters while attempting to solve puzzles.

== Development ==
Developer Invader Studios is based in Italy. Leonardo Interactive released Daymare: 1994 Sandcastle for PlayStation 4 and 5, Xbox One and Series X/S, and Windows on August 30, 2023. A Switch port was released January 2025.

== Reception ==
Daymare: 1994 Sandcastle received mixed reviews on Metacritic. In Japan, four critics from Famitsu gave the game a total score of 29 out of 40. GamingBolt criticized the use of jump scares and said the game was not scary, though they said the story was "pulpy fun". The Games Machine praised the atmosphere. They also enjoyed the technical improvements over 1998 but said it still needs to go further. Vandal said it is still entertaining despite its many shortcomings. Multiplayer.it found using a game controller to be very frustrating but said using keyboard and mouse made it tolerable.
