= Babar (TV series) =

Animated TV series

- Title card
- Genre: Slice of life; Adventure
- Based on: Babar the Elephant by Jean de Brunhoff; Laurent de Brunhoff
- Directed by: Raymond Jafelice; Laura Shepherd; Dale Schott; Larry Jacobs
- Voices of: Gavin Magrath; Gordon Pinsent; Dawn Greenhalgh; Tara Charendoff; Stuart Stone; Elizabeth Hanna; Stephen Ouimette; Allen Stewart-Coates; Corrine Koslo; John Stocker; Chris Wiggins; Bobby Becken; Amos Crawley; Benjamin Barrett; Lea-Helen Weir; Lisa Yamanaka
- Music by: Milan Kymlicka
- Countries of origin: Canada; France
- Original language: English
- No. of seasons: 5
- No. of episodes: 65 (list of episodes)

Production
- Executive producers: Patrick Loubert; Michael Hirsh; Clive A. Smith
- Running time: 23 minutes
- Production companies: Nelvana; The Clifford Ross Company

Original release
- Network: Canal+/FR3 (France); CBC (Canada, seasons 1–3); Canal Familie (Canada, seasons 1–5); Family Channel (Canada, seasons 4–5)
- Release: January 3, 1989 – July 24, 1991

Related
- Babar: The Movie; Babar: King of the Elephants; Babar and the Adventures of Badou

Babar (UK: /ˈbæbɑːr/, US: /bəˈbɑːr/; French pronunciation: [babaʁ]) is an animated television series co-produced by Canadian animation studio Nelvana Limited in association with The Clifford Ross Company. It premiered in 1989 on CBC and Canal Famille in Canada, and on HBO in the United States. The series is based on Jean de Brunhoff's original Babar books, and was Nelvana's first international co-production. The show has been dubbed in 30 languages in over 150 countries.

The show was the first to be based on the Babar books; previously, two Babar specials narrated by Peter Ustinov were produced by Lee Mendelson and Bill Melendez for NBC: The Story of Babar, the Little Elephant on October 21, 1968, and Babar Comes to America on September 7, 1971.

In 2010, a computer-animated sequel/spin-off series of Babar titled Babar and the Adventures of Badou premiered on YTV in Canada and Disney Junior in the United States. The new series takes place several years after the original and focuses on Badou, Babar's grandson and Pom's son as well as introducing new characters.

== Plot ==
Based on the books by Jean de Brunhoff and Laurent de Brunhoff, the plot of the first two seasons focuses on the story of Babar's childhood as it is told by him to his children. The past Babar is a young elephant who, traumatized by a hunter slaughtering his mother, flees from his home forest in exile to the city, where a kind Old Lady adopts him and teaches him the ways of human life. He returns to his home forest full of ideas for progress and, following the previous elephant king's death from eating poisonous mushrooms, hatches a plan to drive out the unnamed hunter and his men. For his heroism, Babar is crowned king of the elephants, plans and builds Celesteville, and grows up to become a father himself.

While the first two seasons focus on Babar's recollections of his childhood and early years as king, and occasionally stories told by his children, the series shifts its focus in the third season to Babar's family life in the present day.

Season 6 sees Babar and Celeste, along with their children (with the exception of Isabelle who appears in the first and final episodes of the season), and Zephir, visit different lands of adventure shown to them on a magical map given to Babar as a boy by a wizard named Max. They travel around in a hot air balloon and help solve problems in each place they visit.

== Episodes ==
Season	Episodes	First aired	Last aired	Network
1	13	April 2, 1989	June 24, 1989	CBC Television
2	13	August 20, 1989	November 12, 1989	CBC Television
3	13	April 1, 1990	June 24, 1990	CBC Television
4	13	June 4, 1991	July 5, 1991	Family Channel
5	13	July 8, 1991	July 24, 1991	Family Channel
6	13	January 6, 2001	March 31, 2001	TVO; Knowledge Network

== Characters ==
=== Babar's family ===
- Babar (voiced by Gordon Pinsent (1989–1991), Gavin Magrath (1989, young), Dan Lett (2001)) is the King of Celesteville. As a young elephant calf, he is forced to leave as his mother is killed by the Hunter during a jungle poaching expedition. He subsequently flees, ending up in Paris, where he is adopted by Madame and learns city ways, such as formal education and clothing. He brings his love of the city back to the great forest and builds the beautiful, happy kingdom of Celesteville for the elephants. He is a dedicated ruler and family man, and a keen world traveler. Due to his childhood experiences, he is extremely protective of his family and kingdom, and often works with other animals in the jungle to ensure the safety of all. However, he is not without a sense of humour, often directed at himself. The first two seasons of the series involve his recalling (and retelling) earlier events in his life as a lesson for his or his children's modern predicaments; from season 3 onward, the series focuses solely on his present life with his family.
- Celeste (voiced by Dawn Greenhalgh (1989–1991), Tara Charendoff (1989, young), Janet-Laine Green (2001)) is Babar's wife and Queen of Celesteville. As Babar's childhood girlfriend, she is portrayed as brave, smart, and spirited. She has also travelled the world and has had many great adventures. As Queen, she has a more regal presence, but she maintains an engaging manner and sense of humour.
- Arthur (voiced by Paul Haddad, Stuart Stone (young)) is Babar's mischief-making brother-in-law. He often gets himself (and Babar's children) involved with practical jokes and stunts. Although the English and French versions of the official characters page lists him as a cousin, this goes against the canon of the show where he is clearly referred to as Celeste's brother, Babar's brother-in-law, and the uncle of Babar and Celeste's children. The Japanese version also refers to him as Celeste's younger brother. In addition, neither Celeste nor Arthur is ever referred to as a cousin of Babar in the show. In the book, "The Story of Babar", Celeste and Arthur are shown to have two different mothers and we are told they are Babar's cousin and little cousin, respectively. Arthur is prominent in childhood flashbacks in the first two seasons, but his later appearances as an adult are sporadic as he is frequently at sea.
- Pom (voiced by Bobby Becken (1989, 1991), Benjamin Barrett (1990), Noah Reid (2001)) is the second child, the oldest son and their informal leader, as well as the heir apparent to Babar. He is protective of his brother and sisters though he will gladly join in with Alexander in playfully teasing his sisters Flora and Isabelle.
- Flora (voiced by Lisa Yamanaka (1989), Lea-Helen Weir (1990–1991), Kristen Bone (2001)) is the oldest daughter. She's portrayed as smart, brave, and strong-willed, much like her mother as a child.
- Alexander (voiced by Amos Crawley (1989), Stuart Stone (1990–1991), Kyle Fairlie (2001)) is the third child and youngest son. He is the goofiest and generally the most fun-loving of the children. Frequently enlisting his siblings in various schemes, he is often disarmingly naive about the commotion he causes.
- Isabelle (voiced by Lisa Yamanaka) is the youngest of the four children. She begins to walk and talk at an early age. Isabelle starts as a baby in the series but eventually develops into a toddler.
- Babar's mother is a female elephant who was shot and killed by the Hunter in the first episode of the show (Babar's First Step), setting the course for much of the rest of the series. Her murder, which Babar witnessed, was a great source of trauma for her son, and influences much of the direction of Babar's life.

=== Babar's close friends and royal court ===
- Madame (voiced by Elizabeth Hanna), also referred to as The Old Lady, is a human who adopted Babar when he ran away from the hunter who killed his mother. From their first meeting in the city, the Old Lady and Babar shared a special friendship. She gave him a home and taught him about life in the city. Though she missed him greatly, she understood his decision to return to the forest. Babar built her a home in Celesteville, where she now lives with her elephant friends. Little is known about her personal life, although Babar at one point meets her former lover when he appears as a reclusive organ-player in The Phantom.
- Zephir (voiced by Jeff Pustil (1989–1991), Philip Williams (2001)) is a monkey who is one of Babar's oldest friends, and is considered one of the family. He is the first to take off with Arthur and the kids on some crazy adventure, but Babar knows that Zephir can always be trusted to look after the children and bring them home safely. Zephir runs the local malt shop and is seen doing various other jobs in Celesteville.
- Cornelius (voiced by Chris Wiggins) is Babar's longtime chief advisor, arguably the wisest elephant in Celesteville. He was present at Babar's birth and has been by his side for most of Babar's life, often acting not just as an advisor and confidant. Even though he is not related to the royal family, Cornelius was very much a father figure towards Babar and Celeste. He also takes the role as a surrogate grandfather towards Pom, Flora, Alexander and Isabelle. Although showing his age (notably through a tendency to fall asleep while at work), he remains sharp and incisive, and is invariably Babar's most trusted counsellor, always accompanying Babar on diplomatic visits or working alongside Babar as he governs the kingdom. His old age is sometimes made fun of by Pompadour, which form a sense of humor throughout the show. While he is more level-headed than Pompadour, Cornelius is occasionally carried away by his colleague's panics. His catchphrase is "My tusks!"
- Pompadour (voiced by Stephen Ouimette) is another advisor to Babar, Pompadour acts as finance minister as well as the minister of royal protocol, to which he strongly adheres, sometimes creating unnecessary bureaucracy for the kingdom. A high-strung elephant, he often opposes radical ideas and is easily alarmed.
- Troubadour is Pompadour's assistant, a smaller elephant who does not speak but is very dedicated to helping Babar and his family. He is prominent in the earlier seasons.
- Chef Truffles (voiced by Dan Hennessey) is the palace cook, dedicated but often easily upset by various situations in the palace which concern food preparation. Something of a stereotype of temperamental French chefs, Truffles speaks with a prominent French accent.
- The Old King is the late King of the Elephants who died after eating poisonous mushrooms. He appears in Babar's First Step, and appears to adult Babar as a vision in Ghost for a Day.
- Other animals sometimes appear as friends or allies of Babar. They include the tortoise king Tuttle and his wife, who play a prominent role in Babar's Triumph and King Tuttle's Vote; a weepy "way-out" bird and a music-loving crocodile who both appear in The Gift, pirate crocodiles (led by Captain Sanga) in The Coin, and others of varying species.

=== Rataxes' family ===
- Lord Rataxes (voiced by Allen Stewart-Coates) is the king of Rhinoland. Rataxes is typically depicted as a rude, cold-hearted and often power-hungry leader. Although he appears sparingly in the books, he serves as Babar's main antagonist in the TV series in various episodes. Rataxes often dreams of dominating the jungle and even claiming the elephant kingdom for himself, but his schemes to advance those goals generally fall apart or are easily thwarted by the elephants. As Rataxes himself admits, his resentment of Babar is rooted in jealousy of Babar's comparative popularity and the success of the elephant kingdom; Babar, for his part, tends to regard Rataxes mainly as an annoyance, but is not unsympathetic to him. Because Rataxes' dislike of Babar is rooted more in this resentment than any personal grudge, he often helps Babar and friends as an antihero; many of the episodes end with Rataxes listening to reason and accepting Babar's point of view as long as he and/or Rhinoland can benefit. Rataxes does have some positive qualities, including his fierce devotion to his family and rhinoceros subjects; his forceful leadership is also helpful when various crises threaten the jungle. He appears to remain the same age both in the present and in Babar's stories from the past, as do his wife and advisor Basil.
- Lady Rataxes (voiced by Corrine Koslo) is Rataxes' wife. She is portrayed as generally calmer and more clear-thinking than her husband, and on friendlier terms with the elephants, but her occasional flights of fancy (such as urging a return to the traditional "rhino rampage" or desiring some luxury good or service) can prompt Rataxes into scheming against the elephants in order to fulfil her wishes. Her real name is Louise, (Note: Lady Retaxes' real name, Louise, is revealed in the episode "No Place Like Home".) but she is normally called Lady Rataxes.
- Victor (voiced by Noah Godfrey) is Rataxes' son, also on friendly terms with the elephants; he is particularly close to Babar's children Alexander, Flora, and Pom, and often appears as their playmate. He worships his father, but like Lady Rataxes and Basil, he shows some awareness of Rataxes' limitations.
- Basil (voiced by John Stocker) is Rataxes' chief advisor; he is highly capable, competent, and organized. Like Lady Rataxes and Victor, he is on friendly terms with the elephants, although Rataxes' various schemes occasionally force Basil into antagonizing them. Serving as a chief administrator of Rhinoland, Basil handles most of the paperwork, coordinates all of the kingdom's day-to-day governance, all while serving as Rataxes' travel agent, spy, and de facto butler. He is also a self-proclaimed fitness expert, an advocate of clean living, and a skillful theatre director. He is extremely loyal and humble to Rataxes but knows that at times Rataxes' urges must be managed carefully. He is also not above subtly poking fun at his employer from time to time.

=== Villains ===
- The Hunter was the primary antagonist for the first five episodes of the series. Introduced in "Babar's First Steps", the Hunter is shown stalking Babar's herd of elephants in the jungle shortly before he shoots and kills Babar's mother. Dressed in a classic colonial-era Africa outfit and sporting a fu manchu moustache, the Hunter is portrayed as a particularly malevolent human, who refuses to reason with the animals and sees them solely as a means to enrich himself. Babar has had nightmares of the Hunter killing his mother in "City Ways", and generally understands the Hunter to be his worst foe. When Babar returns to the forest in "Babar Returns", he finds the Hunter with an SUV and a group of poachers have managed to capture all the elephants. Babar, with the help of Celeste and Arthur, manages to free them, and with Babar's car the group pushes the Hunter off a cliff and into the river. The Hunter returns in force in "Babar's Triumph" with more poachers and his SUV equipped with a plow. The Hunter and his group are successful in capturing Lord Rataxes and the Rhinos, and get dangerously close to the newly constructed Celesteville. While Babar focuses on rescuing Rataxes and the rhinos, the Hunter spreads crude oil throughout the forest in order to start a massive forest fire, which will flush the animals out. Teaming up together, all of the animals successfully fight the fire until the wind changes direction, taking the fire to the Hunter's encampment. The remaining poachers flee, leaving the Hunter screaming in fury "You can run! I won't run! I'LL DESTROY THEM ALL!!!" before being engulfed in the flames.
- Mademoiselle Soretoza is an antagonist that appeared in "The Show Must Go On". An ostrich and award-winning ballerina dancer who comes to perform in Celesteville, she proves to be a temperamental prima donna, and spends much of her time belittling the elephant ballet company and crew working with her. After it appears the show will not go forward when she refuses to perform, Babar confronts her, leading to her quitting the show and being replaced with Celeste (and Lord Rataxes as the leading man).

== Broadcast and home media ==
The series was first premiered in 1989 on CBC and Canal Famille in Canada and HBO in the United States. Seasons 4 and 5 first aired in Canada on the Family Channel, with English-language reruns of the series later airing on the Global Television Network.

It was subsequently rerun on Qubo from September 9, 2006 and January 14, 2007 until its closure on February 28, 2021. The show has been dubbed in 30 languages in over 150 countries. The series is currently available to stream on Peacock (before removed), Tubi, Amazon Prime Video, and Pluto TV.

=== DVD releases ===
In Region 2, Fremantle Home Entertainment released a three-single disc collections on DVD in the United Kingdom on May 4, 2009.

In June 2012, Entertainment One released the complete first season on DVD in Region 1 for the very first time.

DVD name	Ep #	Release date
Babar - The Classic Series: The Complete First Season	13	June 5, 2012

== Reception ==
=== Critical response ===
David Knox at TV Tonight commented on the subject of death and the way it is depicted in Children's Television, citing the pilot of Babar as an example: "This week ABC replayed the pilot episode of the animated series in which the baby elephant loses his mother to a hunter after being shot by a rifle. Produced by a Canadian company in 1989 it doesn't shy away from the separation of mother and child, as written in the original Babar the Elephant stories". An ABC spokesperson told TV Tonight that ABC had carefully considered the content which aired at 3:30 p.m. EST on ABC2 for a G-rated audience, ABC in Australia (2 July 1990 - 3 June 2012): "At no point in the sequence was there any depiction of blood or wounds, and the depiction of the rifle being used was very careful and discreet. The simple animation style reduced the level of detail of the rifle and the action. While there was a sense of threat and menace associated with the hunter and his use of violence, having regard to the animation style, the level of visual detail, and the stylized manner in which the action was depicted, Audience and Consumer Affairs considers that this sense of threat and menace was very low. The violence in the sequence was very discreetly implied, and was not gratuitous as it was a pivotal, dramatic moment of great significance to the story".

Charles Solomon of Los Angeles Times gave a review of the show's first few episodes: "The designs for the characters and the simple animation capture the essence of Jean de Brunhoff's understated watercolor illustrations. The artists occasionally seem to lose their sense of the characters' size and weight: the young Babar jumps and climbs in ways that seem very unelephantlike (but very few elephants wear uniforms and crowns, as the adult Babar does). As the voice of Babar, Gordon Pinsent gives the elephant king a reassuring presence and keeps the mildly didactic stories from bogging down in moralizing. Child actors provide the voices for the young Babar and his friends, which makes the show sound a lot like a "Peanuts" special at times. Created by the Canadian Nelvana studio - the producers of the entertaining My Pet Monster - "Babar" manages to be endearing without sliding into the saccharine cutesiness of Hello Kitty. Parents with children in the 4-to-10-year-old range should plan on setting their VCRs: The kids will probably want to watch Babar more than once".

Common Sense Media finds the series suitable for viewers aged 4 and up and has given the series 4 stars out of 5, writing that Babar is a good role model who promotes sharing and getting along with others. They continued to say that Parents Need to Know that "although the show is an ideal pick for preschoolers, most kids will probably outgrow it by the time they're 7". The review ended by saying: "Many shows adapted from books tend to move at a slow pace. But Babar provides enough adventure and silliness to keep even the most active preschooler engaged. As an extra plus, the music is beautifully orchestrated. Babar exemplifies the lesson that all of us are the same on the inside. These elephants hold their trunks high, but they also know that money doesn't conquer all. Many kids' shows depict well-off characters as villainous and/or gluttonous; Babar shows kids that wealth doesn't necessarily equate to greed".

=== Awards ===
In 1990, the TV series won a 7 d'Or award for Best Youth Program (Meilleure émission pour la jeunesse). In 1989, the TV series won a Gemini award for Best Animated Program or Series (Patrick Loubert, Lenora Hume, Clive A. Smith, and Michael Hirsh). In 1990, the show won a Gemini for Best Animated Program or Series (Patrick Loubert, Michael Hirsh, and Clive A. Smith). It was also nominated for a Gemini award for Best Original Music Score for a Series (Milan Kymlicka). In 1992, the TV series won a Gemini award for Best Animated Program or Series (Clive A. Smith, Patrick Loubert, and Michael Hirsh).

== Films ==
=== Babar: The Movie ===
In the year of 1989, United States distributor New Line Cinema joined forces with two Canadian companies Nelvana and Astral Films to make a film adaption of Babar. This would be followed by a sequel released in 1999, titled Babar: King of the Elephants, and was released by Alliance Films theatrically and HBO Home Video as a direct-to-video film.

=== Babar and Father Christmas ===
The 1986 television film Babar and Father Christmas won the 1987 Gemini Award for Best Animated Program or Series. It first aired on HBO in the United States on December 5, 1986, on the CBC in Canada on December 15, on the BBC in the United Kingdom on Christmas Eve 1986 and on the ABC in Australia on Christmas Day 1987. The film's DVD title is also known as Babar et le Père Noël in France. The film was made in Canada. The song "Christmas in Celesteville" was featured in the TV film. Gary Morton wrote the music and Merilyn Read wrote the lyrics. John Brough, Geri Childs, Teresa Dunn, and Craig Kennedy are credited as singers.

== Revival series (2000) ==
Babar
- Genre: Adventure
- Created by: see creator
- Voices of: Dan Lett; Janet-Laine Green; Kyle Fairlie; Kristen Bone; Noah Reid; Philip Williams
- Countries of origin: Canada; France; Japan
- Original language: English
- No. of seasons: 1
- No. of episodes: 13

Production
- Executive producers: Patrick Loubert; Michael Hirsh; Clive A. Smith; Dan Danko; Tom K. Mason; Clifford Ross
- Producer: Andrew Young
- Running time: 23 minutes
- Production companies: Nelvana Limited; Ellipse Animation SNC; Kodansha Ltd.; The Clifford Ross Company, Ltd.; TV-Loonland AG

Original release
- Network: La Cinquième (France); TVOntario (Canada); Knowledge Network (Canada)
- Release: January 6 – March 31, 2001

There was a short-lived revival of the animated series that aired in 2000 on La Cinquième in France and a year later on TVOntario's TVOKids block and Knowledge Network in Canada. Nelvana returned to co-produce this series, alongside Ellipseanime and the Japanese company Kodansha. Most of the episodes for the revival series have Babar and his family traveling in a hot-air balloon to different lands of adventure, such as the Land of Toys. None of the voice cast from the previous series returned for the revival, though Dan Lett, who voiced Babar, would go on to voice his son Pom's adult self in Babar and the Adventures of Badou.

=== Revival episodes ===
No.	Title	Original release date
1	"The Departure"	January 6, 2001 (TVO)
While being punished for their rowdy behavior, Alexander, Flora and Pom find their father's old magic map in a dusty corner of the attic.
2	"Adventures on Big Island"	January 13, 2001 (TVO)
Babar, Celeste, Zephir and the children arrive at their first destination only to find that everything on the island is bigger than usual. The plants are bigger, the fruit is bigger and even the people are bigger.
3	"Land of Games"	January 20, 2001 (TVO)
After landing their balloon on a giant chessboard, the gang realizes that they have come across a land filled with games.
4	"Land of Toys"	January 27, 2001 (TVO)
Alexander, Flora and Pom are overjoyed when they learn that their balloon has landed in a town inhabited by toys. Everyone appears to be happy until they follow their new friend, a dancing doll named Dora to a terrible factory for broken toys. A perfectionist robot named Morpho destroys any toys that aren't perfect, and Babar and his friends must help her save the toys.
5	"Land of Ice"	February 3, 2001 (TVO)
A large wooden door in the middle of the jungle leads the family to the beautiful Land of Ice. Inside however, things aren't as playful as they had hoped. There, the family meets a very sad penguin named Frio whose fish has been stolen by the neighboring polar bears led by Ursa Major, and it is up to the family to stop them and to save the feast.
6	"Land of Pirates"	February 10, 2001 (TVO)
While on a fishing adventure, Babar and his family get shipwrecked in a terrible storm. A pirate ship led by the Pirate Captain comes to their rescue and brings the family to the Pirate Mansion where a big feast is prepared.
7	"Land of Witches"	February 17, 2001 (TVO)
After following a path lined with flowers, the family finds themselves in a magical land inhabited by witches. The first friend they meet is a Witch-In-Training named Lulu. When Lulu turns Pom into a pig, Babar and his family will have to find a way to reverse the spell and turning him back to normal.
8	"Land of Mysterious Water"	February 24, 2001 (TVO)
Babar, Celeste, Zephir and the children, come across a spring filled with mysterious water in this land of adventure. Surprisingly, the water allows them to float in the sky.
9	"Land of The Underground"	March 3, 2001 (TVO)
Looking for the next Land of Adventure, the family balloon crashes and falls into a large crevasse. This time, they find themselves in an enchanted underground city.
10	"The Seabed Land"	March 10, 2001 (TVO)
When the balloon lands on a small island in the middle of the ocean, they come across a giant sea turtle who shows them the way to their next land of adventure.
11	"Land of the Treats"	March 17, 2001 (TVO)
Babar and his family arrive in a town where everything is made out of treats and every store they go into has better tasting delicacies than the last. That is, until they find a bakery with the worst tasting cakes in the land.
12	"Land of the Treasure Hunt"	March 24, 2001 (TVO)
Babar and his family find themselves in the middle of a championship treasure hunt. The children are sure they can win; after all, they go on treasure hunts all the time back home in Celesteville.
13	"Land of Happiness"	March 31, 2001 (TVO)
Once Babar and his family journey through this final land, they should be able to reach the fabled Land of Happiness. That, of course, is easier said than done.

== See also ==
- List of French animated television series
- List of French television series
- List of Canadian animated television series
- List of Canadian television series
- List of Japanese television series
