= Bobby Becken =

Canadian actor

- Born: John Robert Wayne Becken; Canada
- Occupation: Voice Actor
- Years active: 1987-1989

Bobby Becken is a Canadian voice actor, active between 1987 and 1989. He made his debut in 1987 on the Stevie Mumford TV movie A Mouse, A Mystery and Me. The majority of Becken's work was on the 1989 children's series Babar, as the character 'Pom'. He featured in the first two series of the show, and consequently the 1989 release, Babar: The Movie, which served as a follow-up to the first series.

== Filmography ==
Television
Year	Title	Role	Notes
1987	A Mouse, A Mystery and Me	Stevie Mumford	TV movie
1988	Ramona	Howie	1 episode: Squeakerfoot
1988	Clifford's Fun With Letters	Voice	Video Short
1989	Babar	Pom	26 episodes
Film
Year	Film	Role	Other notes
1989	Babar: The Movie	Pom	Voice Role
