= List of Babar episodes =

The article is a complete list of episodes from the animated television series Babar, which was based on the famous book series for children, Babar the Elephant. The series aired from 1989 to 1991 and was revived in 2001.

== Series overview ==
Season	Episodes	First aired	Last aired	Network
1	13	April 2, 1989	June 24, 1989	CBC Television
2	13	August 20, 1989	November 12, 1989	CBC Television
3	13	April 1, 1990	June 24, 1990	CBC Television
4	13	June 4, 1991	July 5, 1991	Family Channel
5	13	July 8, 1991	July 24, 1991	Family Channel
6	13	January 6, 2001	March 31, 2001	TVO; Knowledge Network

== Episodes ==
=== Season 1 (1989) ===
No.	Title	Original release date
1	"Babar's First Step"	April 2, 1989
2	"City Ways"	April 9, 1989
3	"Babar Returns"	April 16, 1989
4	"The City of Elephants"	April 23, 1989
5	"Babar's Triumph"	April 30, 1989
Note: A part of Babar's Triumph appeared in the 1996 video Kids for Character to illustrate citizenship.
6	"Babar's Choice"	May 7, 1989
7	"Race to the Moon"	May 14, 1989
8	"No Place Like Home"	May 21, 1989
9	"An Elephant's Best Friend"	May 28, 1989
10	"The Show Must Go On"	June 3, 1989
11	"To Duet Or Not to Duet"	June 10, 1989
12	"The Missing Crown Affair"	June 17, 1989
13	"The Phantom"	June 24, 1989

=== Season 2 (1989) ===
No.	Title	Original release date
14	"The Gift"	August 20, 1989
15	"School Days"	August 27, 1989
16	"Between Friends"	September 3, 1989
17	"King Tuttle's Vote"	September 10, 1989
18	"Elephant Express"	September 17, 1989
19	"Peer Pressure"	September 24, 1989
20	"Tour De Celesteville"	October 1, 1989
21	"Rhino War"	October 8, 1989
22	"Double the Guards"	October 15, 1989
23	"Monkey Business"	October 22, 1989
24	"The Intruder"	October 29, 1989
25	"Conga the Terrible"	November 5, 1989
26	"Remember When...?"	November 12, 1989

=== Season 3 (1990) ===
No.	Title	Original release date
27	"Special Delivery"	April 1, 1990
28	"The Celesteville Enquirer"	April 8, 1990
29	"To Tell Or Not to Tell"	April 15, 1990
30	"Witches Potion"	April 22, 1990
31	"Fathers and Sons"	April 29, 1990
32	"Uncle Arthur and the Pirates"	May 6, 1990
33	"My Dinner With Rataxes"	May 13, 1990
34	"The Coin"	May 20, 1990
35	"A Charmed Life"	May 27, 1990
36	"A Tale of Two Siblings"	June 3, 1990
37	"The Unsalted Sea Serpent"	June 10, 1990
38	"Ghost for a Day"	June 17, 1990
39	"Boys Will Be Boys"	June 24, 1990

=== Season 4 (1991) ===
No.	Title	Original release date
40	"Alexander the Great"	June 4, 1991
41	"Cruel to Be Kind"	June 7, 1991
42	"A Pair of Queens"	June 11, 1991
43	"Rowing Pains"	June 16, 1991
44	"Arthur's Object"	June 18, 1991
45	"The Diaperman Cometh"	June 23, 1991
46	"Time Flies"	June 25, 1991
47	"Insecurity System"	June 30, 1991
48	"Kings of the Castle"	July 1, 1991
49	"What's Mine Is Mine"	July 2, 1991
50	"The Scarlet Pachyderm"	July 3, 1991
51	"All Played Out"	July 4, 1991
52	"Radio Riot"	July 5, 1991

=== Season 5 (1991) ===
No.	Title	Original release date
53	"The Lead Blimp"	July 8, 1991
54	"Helping Hands"	July 9, 1991
55	"The One That Got Away"	July 10, 1991
56	"Every Basket Has a Silver Lining"	July 11, 1991
57	"Victor Victorious"	July 12, 1991
58	"The Unsung Hero"	July 15, 1991
59	"Friendly Agreement"	July 16, 1991
60	"Oh, to be an Adult"	July 17, 1991
61	"The Old Lady Vanishes"	July 18, 1991
62	"A Child in the Snow"	July 19, 1991
63	"Never Cry Alien"	July 22, 1991
64	"Robot Rampage"	July 23, 1991
65	"Mango Madness"	July 24, 1991

=== Season 6 (2001) ===
No.	Title	Original release date
66	"The Departure"	January 6, 2001 (TVO)
67	"Adventures on Big Island"	January 13, 2001 (TVO)
68	"Land of Games"	January 20, 2001 (TVO)
69	"Land of Toys"	January 27, 2001 (TVO)
70	"Land of Ice"	February 3, 2001 (TVO)
71	"Land of Pirates"	February 10, 2001 (TVO)
72	"Land of Witches"	February 17, 2001 (TVO)
73	"Land of Mysterious Water"	February 24, 2001 (TVO)
74	"Land of The Underground"	March 3, 2001 (TVO)
75	"The Seabed Land"	March 10, 2001 (TVO)
76	"Land of the Treats"	March 17, 2001 (TVO)
77	"Land of the Treasure Hunt"	March 24, 2001 (TVO)
78	"Land of Happiness"	March 31, 2001 (TVO)
