= Michael Becken =

German politician (born 1980)

Member of the Hamburg Parliament
- Incumbent
- Assumed office 26 March 2025

Personal details
- Born: 1980 (age 45–46)
- Party: Christian Democratic Union (since 2024)

Michael Becken (born 1980) is a Polish-born German politician serving as a member of the Hamburg Parliament since 2025. From 2023 to 2026, he served as rector of the Northern Business School.
