= Kiki's Delivery Service (disambiguation) =

Kiki's Delivery Service may refer to:

- Kiki's Delivery Service (novel), the original novel and its sequels
  - Kiki's Delivery Service, a 1989 Japanese animated fantasy film written, produced, and directed by Hayao Miyazaki
  - Kiki's Delivery Service (musical), musical adaptations of the book and the anime film
  - Kiki's Delivery Service (2014 film), a live-action adaptation of the first two novels
