= Stephen Ouimette =

Canadian actor and director

- Occupations: Actor, voice actor, musician
- Years active: 1985–present

Stephen Ouimette is a Canadian actor and director. Although mostly known for his stage work, particularly at the Stratford Festival of Canada and on Broadway in La Bete, he achieved TV fame (and a Gemini Award) as the ghostly Oliver Welles in the drama Slings and Arrows. From 2016 to 2019, Ouimette was the head of Stratford's Birmingham Conservatory, a training program for young actors.

Ouimette is also a voice actor, and is known for voicing Beetlejuice in the eponymous animated series, Angel in X-Men: The Animated Series, Pompadour in Babar and the titular Beast in Maggie and the Ferocious Beast.

== Filmography ==
=== Film ===
Year	Title	Role	Notes
1989	The Top of His Head	Gus Victor	
1989	Destiny to Order	J. D. Baird	
1991	The Adjuster	Larry	
2000	After Alice	Gideon Wood	
2005	The Care Bears' Big Wish Movie	Too Loud Bear (voice)	

=== Television ===
Year	Title	Role	Notes
1986	The Campbells	Matthew Greener	Episode: "Heaven Sent"
1988	A Nest of Singing Birds	Michie	
1988–90	Street Legal	Sean McGillivray, Waiter	2 episodes
1989–91	Beetlejuice	Beetlejuice (voice)	Main cast
1989–91	Babar	Pompadour (voice)	Main cast
1992	The Trial of Red Riding Hood	The Boy Who Cried Wolf	Television film
1992–93	Dog City	Mad Dog (voice)	6 episodes
1992–96	X-Men: The Animated Series	Warren Worthington III / Angel / Archangel, Immortus (voice)	10 episodes
1993–94	Tales from the Cryptkeeper	Chuck (voice)	2 episodes
1994–96	The Busy World of Richard Scarry	Mr. Frumble, Mr. Raccoon, Doctor Lion, additional voices	Recurring cast
1999–2000	Mythic Warriors	Dionysus (voice)	2 episodes
2000	The Avengers: United They Stand	Nicholas Scratch (voice)	Episode: "The Sorceress's Apprentice"
2000	Franklin	Mr. Coyote (voice)	Episode: "Franklin's Good Deeds"
2000	The City	L'ecuyer #1	Episode: "Swing Your Partner"
2000–02	Maggie and the Ferocious Beast	Beast (voice)	Main cast
2001	Anne of Green Gables: The Animated Series	Cartographer (voice)	Episode: "Lost and Found"
2001	I Was a Rat	Wheedle	3 episodes
2001–02	Pecola	Mr. Saruyama (voice)	English dub
2001	Mentors	William Shakespeare	Episode: "Such Stuff as Dreams Are Made Of"
2003–06	Slings & Arrows	Oliver Welles	18 episodes
2004	Puppets Who Kill	Dr. Galileo	Episode: "Dan and the Necrophiliac"
2006	Grossology	Frederick Fellicile (voice)	Episode: "Hairless Whispers"
2018	Cardinal	Frederick Bell	6 episodes
