= Babar: King of the Elephants =

1999 film

- Canadian theatrical release poster
- Directed by: Raymond Jafelice
- Screenplay by: Raymond Jafelice; Peter Sauder
- Based on: Babar the Elephant (book series) by Jean de Brunhoff; Laurent de Brunhoff
- Produced by: Hasmi Giakoumis; Merle-Anne Ridley
- Starring: Kristin Fairlie; Janet Laine-Green; Elizabeth Hanna; Dan Lett; Wayne Robson; Chris Wiggins
- Edited by: Karen Lawrie; Noda Tsamardos
- Music by: Great Big Music Inc. (Note: Tom Thorney, Tim Thorney, Peter Coulman, Brent Barkman and Carl Lenox)
- Production companies: Nelvana Limited; Home Made Movies S.A.; TMO-Loonland Film GmbH; France 3 Cinéma (Note: French release, not credited in other releases)
- Distributed by: Alliance Atlantis Releasing (Canada); Gebeka Films (France); Advanced Film-Verleih (Germany)
- Release dates: 26 February 1999 (Canada); 28 April 1999 (France); 20 May 1999 (Germany)
- Running time: 79 minutes
- Countries: Canada; France; Germany
- Language: English
- Box office: $227,374

Babar: King of the Elephants is a 1999 animated coming-of-age adventure film directed by Raymond Jafelice and co-produced by Nelvana Limited, Home Made Movies, and TMO-Loonland Film, and produced in association with The Clifford Ross Company, Ltd. and with the participation of Canal+. It is the second film based on Jean de Brunhoff's original book series, following Babar: The Movie., and chronicles the events of the first four Babar books.

== Plot ==
The film opens with various birds singing "The Ancient Song of the Elephants". Marabou, a marabou stork, introduces the story that is about to unfold, beginning with a historically significant event: the birth of Babar the elephant.

In the Great Forest, Babar lives a happy childhood being cared for by his loving mother and playing with the other young elephants, including his friends Arthur and Celeste. One day Babar's mother is shot and killed by a poacher, and Babar is forced to flee as the poacher approaches; after days of wandering, he eventually finds his way to an unnamed city in Paris. Babar spends an eventful day exploring the city and engaging in human activities such as eating ice cream for the first time, all the while disturbing traffic and frightening the other citizens. He meets an older woman, Madame, who provides him with money to purchase proper clothing at a nearby store. Following an extensive fitting session, Babar emerges from the store wearing his signature bright green suit, red bow tie, and a bowler hat. Madame invites Babar to live with her, and she raises him as if he is human, educating him on subjects including mathematics, etiquette, and how to drive a car on the roads. Although Babar enjoys his new life, he occasionally thinks back to his childhood in the Great Forest, missing his elephant friends and his deceased mother.

Two years later, while on a walk with Madame, Babar is shocked to discover Arthur and Celeste, who have left the Great Forest in search of him. The three friends spend the day in a fashion reminiscent of Babar's first day in the city, but they are interrupted by Celeste's mother and another adult elephant from the Great Forest, who have been searching for the runaway children. They inform him that the King of the Elephants has died from accidentally eating poisonous mushrooms, and that the rhinoceroses have waged war against the elephants due to Arthur and the other younger elephants playing pranks on them. That evening, Madame and Babar agree that it is time for him to return home.

Babar is welcomed back to the Great Forest, where he reunites with his old friend Cornelius and the rest of the elephants. Meanwhile, Lord Rataxes, the leader of the rhinoceroses, mobilizes his forces in preparation for war against the elephants. Babar devises a plan to stop the war: he paints monster faces on the backsides of elephants and has them walk backwards in their approach towards the enemy. The plan succeeds in forcing the rhinoceros troops to retreat in fear, and Babar then has Arthur apologize to the abandoned Rataxes for offending the rhinoceroses, thus restoring peace to the jungle. For his brilliant idea and bravery, Babar is asked to be the new King of the Elephants; he agrees on the condition that Celeste be his Queen, which she accepts.

As King, Babar is keen to introduce Western civilization to the elephants by building a City of the Elephants. He brings in Madame — along with loads of supplies on the backs of camels — to the Great Forest, and together with the rest of the elephants they build huts with thatched roofs for residences, as well as other common city buildings such as a hospital, a theatre, and a courthouse. As they are establishing roles for all of the animal citizens within their new city, Celeste reveals to Babar that she is pregnant; she later gives birth to triplets Flora, Pom, and Alexander. Problems eventually begin to arise in the City of the Elephants, including Madame being bitten by a cobra while protecting Zephir, Cornelius being struck unconscious by a fallen beam when his hut catches fire, and Alexander nearly getting eaten by a crocodile when the family go on a picnic. That night, Babar's troubles manifest in a nightmare in which he is threatened by a visit from the wicked goddess-riding demon gazelle Misfortune, and other demon animals representing (in the order that they appear) despair, fear, sickness, anger, stupidity, and discouragement, and rescued by elephant angels representing, for instance, courage, happiness, health, and love. He dreams that Flora is the spirit of love ("I am Love, and I am here, to show you joy and peace. Now, good things will come to you, and bring you happiness..."). Flora awakens him the next morning, and when she does, he discovers that both Cornelius and Madame are well on their way to recovering from their respective ordeals. The elephants rejoice in the completion of their beautiful new city, for which Babar proposes a new name: Celesteville, named after Celeste.

== Voice cast ==
- Dan Lett as King Babar
  - Kristin Fairlie as Young Babar
- Janet-Laine Green as Queen Celeste
  - Jennifer Martini as Young Celeste
- Chris Wiggins as Cornelius
- Philip Williams as Zephir
- Amos Crawley as Uncle Arthur
  - Kyle Fairlie as Young Arthur/Alexander
- Kristen Bone as Flora
- Cody Jones as Pom
- Elizabeth Hanna as Madame
- Allen Stewart-Coates as Rataxes
- Wayne Robson as Marabou/Sales Manager
- Ellen-Ray Hennessy as Babar's Mother/Misfortune
- Paul Haddad as Elevator Boy/Tailor

== Soundtrack ==
The film features five main songs.

The songs are (in order of appearance):

- "Find Your Way" — performed by Lis Soderberg.
- "Take Good Care of Me" — performed by Elizabeth Hanna, Dan Lett, and Kristin Fairlie.
- "Rataxes" — performed by Tom Thorney, Tim Thorney, and Carl Lenox.
- "Joy, Joy, Joy" — performed by Rachel Oldfield.
- "Scary Song" — performed by Tom Thorney, Tim Thorney, Carl Lenox, Lis Soderberg, Rachel Oldfield, Cassandra Vasik, and Emilie-Claire Barlow.

== Production ==
The film was the second in Nelvana's newly-formed feature film division after Pippi Longstocking, and was originally intended to be released straight-to-video in 1998.

The film was produced as an international co-production between Nelvana in Canada, Home Made Movies SA in France, and TMO-Loonland Film in Germany, the latter handling the animation production through their in-house TMO studio and Loonland Animation in Hungary.

International sales were shared between all three companies; TMO-Loonland handled most of Europe, Ellipsanime handled French-speaking territories, while Nelvana Enterprises handled the rest.

== Release ==
Alongside its release in Canada, France, and Germany, the film was released theatrically in most of Europe, alongside Japan.

The film was released direct-to-video in the United States by HBO Video on 21 December 1999, and in the United Kingdom by Abbey Home Entertainment on 20 November 2000.

=== Critical reception ===
On Rotten Tomatoes the film has 2 reviews listed, both positive.
