= Babar and the Adventures of Badou =

Animated television series

- Genre: Slice of life Adventure
- Created by: Michael Stokes
- Based on: Babar the Elephant by Jean de Brunhoff; Laurent de Brunhoff
- Written by: Michael Stokes; Steve Sullivan; John van Bruggen; Mary Mackay-Smith; Ken Sobol; Julie Macfie Sobol; Elizabeth Keyishian; Erika Strobel; Ursula Ziegler-Sullivan; Dale Schott; Jeff Sweeney; Ben Joseph; Kristen McGregor; Nicky Barton; Nick Flanagan; Camille Vizzavona; Sylvie Barro; Kathryn Walton Ward; Annetta Zucchi; Mireille Pertusot; Catherine Cuenca; Justine Cheynet; Amy Benham; Robert Pincombe; Shelley Hoffman; Louise Moon; Sheila Dinsmore; Jessica Westhead; Nicole Keefler; Rose Tavelli; Charles-Henri Moarbes; Hugh Duffy; Bob Ardiel; Christopher Panzner; Sumira Dhawan
- Directed by: Mike Fallows
- Voices of: Isabel de Carteret; Catherine Disher; Dawn Greenhalgh; Dallas Jokic; Noah Lehman; Tyler Stevenson; Samantha Weinstein; Chris Wiggins; Benedict Campbell; Leslie Carlson; Laura de Carteret; Sergio Di Zio; Jayne Eastwood; Molly Johnson; Dan Lett; Scott McCord; Jeff Pustil; Samantha Reynolds; Lyon Smith; Adrian Truss; Gordon Pinsent; Drew Adkins; Tajja Isen
- Theme music composer: Steve D'Angelo; Terry Tompkins
- Opening theme: "Babar and the Adventures of Badou"
- Ending theme: "Babar and the Adventures of Badou" (instrumental)
- Composer: Jeff Danna
- Countries of origin: Canada; France; Luxembourg (S1–2)
- Original languages: English; French
- No. of seasons: 3
- No. of episodes: 65 (list of episodes)

Production
- Executive producers: Caroline Souris; Corinne Kouper; Guillaume Hellouin; Doug Murphy (S1–2); Clifford Ross; Paul Robertson (episodes 1–13); Colin Bohm (episodes 37–65); Irene Weibel (S3)
- Producers: Jane Sobol (S2) (Note: Credited as Line Producer during Season 1.); Christina Sang (S3)
- Running time: 24 minutes (12 minutes per segment)
- Production companies: Nelvana Limited; TeamTO; The Clifford Ross Company; LuxAnimation (S1–2)

Original release
- Network: YTV (Canada); TF1 (TFOU) (France)
- Release: September 6, 2010 – January 2, 2015

Related
- Babar

Babar and the Adventures of Badou is an animated children's television series based on Babar the Elephant, a character created by Jean and Laurent de Brunhoff. Produced by Nelvana, TeamTO and LuxAnimation, in co-production with TF1 and in association with YTV, the series takes place several years after the original series and has created new characters to the Babar universe, including Badou, who is Babar's 8-year-old grandson and the protagonist of the series.

This series first premiered on September 6, 2010 in Australia on ABC2, in Latin America on Discovery Kids on September 27, in France on TF1's TFOU strand on November 8, and in Canada on YTV on November 22. Vice President and managing director of Nelvana Enterprises, Colin Bohm explained that Nelvana was excited to bring Babar into the 21st century with a new 3D TV series as well as a comprehensive licensing program from TF1. The series also premiered in the U.S. on Playhouse Disney.

Babar and the Adventures of Badou was renewed for a second season, which began airing on Disney Junior on March 25, 2013. The third and final season aired from 2014 to 2015. 65 episodes were produced over three seasons. It was the last role for Chris Wiggins before his death in 2017, the last time Gordon Pinsent voiced Babar before his death in 2023 and the last time Dawn Greenhalgh voiced Celeste before her death in 2026.

== Overview ==
The series follows the adventures of Babar's 8-year-old grandson Badou, who along with his friends and family, solves numerous mysteries, puzzles and situations in Celesteville. The city now features other animals besides elephants.

Although the series features a majority of new characters to the Babar universe, some of the original characters remain though, such as Babar, Celeste, Pom (who is now grown up), Cornelius, Zephir, Lord and Lady Rataxes, with other original characters also involved. Some of the other characters, including Alexander, Flora, Isabelle, Pompadour, Troubadour, Basil, Victor, Uncle Arthur, and all of the human characters, like Madame, do not return and appear in the series because they have aged, retired, and moved away.

== Episodes ==
Season	Episodes	Originally aired	
Season	Episodes	First aired	Last aired
1	26	February 14, 2011	January 4, 2012
2	26	March 25, 2013	January 17, 2014
3	13	July 10, 2014	January 2, 2015

== Characters ==
=== Pupil characters ===
- Badou (voiced by Dallas Jokic and Drew Adkins) is an elephant, prince of Celesteville, who lives there with his grandparents. Badou (or “Bou”) is bursting with a sense of adventure. He has inherited his grandfather's daring spirit, plunging into any situation with boundless confidence that he can handle whatever it can throw at him. He idolises his grandfather, and feels the need to prove himself worthy of his legendary status.
- Chiku (voiced by Samantha Weinstein) is a monkey. Chiku means canary in Swahili. Chiku is widely inquisitive and easily distracted. A fast-talking chatterbox who can ask a dozen questions at once, she is convinced that there is something wonderful under every rock, at the end of every wire, and at the heart of every lesson. She is quite inventive, often building toys or tools for the others to use. She is an accomplished dancer due to her natural acrobatic skills and sense of balance.
- Munroe (voiced by Tyler Stevenson) is a courageous crested porcupine who has been touched many times, but, due to his spiky body, has always been well protected. Munroe considers himself Badou's personal champion: a spike-laced Lancelot. Despite being quite chubby, he is very athletic. He dreams to one day become a member of the Royal Guard as he is currently too young to actually join and in "Point Guard" Munroe becomes a member of the Junior Royal Cadets, a new training program created by King Babar as a youth training camp to prepare kids like Munroe who aspire to become a part of the Royal Guard. He is also a practitioner of the martial art Quill-Fu, though in Fu Finder, it is revealed that most of his Quill-Fu moves were learned from comics, in which, after a suggestion from Babar, Munroe seeks out the legendary Quill-Fu master, Jabbsi, who becomes Munroe's martial arts mentor.
- Zawadi (voiced by Isabel deCarteret) is a zebra who, like the rest of her kind, sees the world in black and white; right and wrong. Outspoken and sometimes bossy, Zawadi wants to do more than just blend in with the herd and is determined to make her own stripe on the world. Zawadi means gift in Swahili. Like King Babar, she is shown to have a love of flowers and gardening.
- Jake (voiced by Noah Lehman and Gage Munroe) is a scruffy, 5-year-old fox pup. Jake was orphaned as a wild kit and found his way to Celesteville, where he befriended Badou. Cornelius is his legal guardian.

=== Side characters ===
- Miss Strich (voiced by Catherine Disher) is an ostrich. She serves as a teacher, the palace guide for tourists, and also organizes most of Celesteville's events. She is very flighty and excitable, with Badou and his friends' merrymaking usually making her even more so. Occasionally Badou and the kids end up teaching her new things such as tennis and baking.
- Crocodylus (voiced by Benedict Campbell) is a crocodile, who is the ambassador of the Crocodile kingdom and Tersh and Dilash's uncle. A consummate schemer, his underhanded strategies range from trying to take over Celesteville to winning contests. When things go wrong, he groans "Muck and mire!"
- Dilash (voiced by Lyon Smith) is a young crocodile. Dilash is the nephew of Crocodylus. He, along with his cousin, causes trouble and tries to interfere with Badou and his friends' adventures. He lives in Celesteville, along with Tersh, to make his uncle Crocodylus seem more respectable. Unlike Tersh, he is mean and a somewhat of a bully to Badou and his friends. As a result, he is more willing to go along with his Uncle Crocodylus' schemes. Both he and his uncle have no problem taking advantage of Tersh's gullibility.
- Tersh (voiced by Sergio Di Zio) is a younger crocodile who is Dilash's cousin and Crocodylus' nephew, he is usually seen unwillingly helping his relatives with one of their schemes. He can be mean, but is generally backing up his older cousin or his uncle as opposed to being outright malicious. He is much kinder and more friendly than they are, and the other children eventually forged a friendship with him especially Prince Badou. He tends to be a bit less intelligent than the others and somewhat gullible, and his uncle and cousin often take advantage of this. However, despite this, Tersh cares deeply for both Dilash and Crocodylus as he once asks his friends Badou and Munroe to help him keep his uncle from getting into trouble. In another episode, he took Zawadi's Zebra book of Stripes for Dilash who kept telling him how much he liked it, causing Zawadi to wrongly suspect that Dilash had stolen it, unaware that Dilash was innocent and that Tersh had taken the book to make Dilash happy. When the truth is revealed, Tersh apologizes for taking it without asking, though ironically Zawadi herself had borrowed the book without asking her parents, causing both her and Tersh to learn a valuable lesson about taking things without permission.
- Boss of the Slogs is the matriarch of the Crocodile kingdom who rules the swamps. Like Tersh, she is friendly and is a just ruler, unlike Crocodylus. She is protected by a group of elite bodyguards known as the Brawlers.
- Gallop (voiced by Leslie Carlson) is a wise old tortoise, who lives just outside Celesteville.
- Dandy Andi (voiced by Scott McCord) is a wild lion who is the King of the nearby savanna. Andi calls the animals that live in Celesteville "tame towners". However, unlike the rest of his wild brethren, Andi is cool and friendly. He is quite famous among the animals on the savanna. Like most of his wild brethren, he walks on all fours. He is a good friend of Badou and the gang, and will often alert them if he sees Sleek nearby. Due to living in the wild, he rarely visits Celesteville and during his rare visits to the Royal Palace, he often has trouble standing up due to not being used to walking on the palace's tile floors, which results in Andi sliding around.
- Hannah, Ramzi & Skyla (all voiced by Julie Lemieux) are the trio of wild lionesses who live in the savanna and friends of Dandy Andi. While usually wild, they did however take Jake in and raise him as a kit, though a monsoon washed him out of their den and they had been looking for him ever since. In "The Day of the Jake", they reunite with Jake during his, Badou, and Chiku's mission to find out the day Jake came to Celesteville and almost attacked Badou & Chiku but become friendly when they find out they are Jake's friends and are surprised to hear that Jake now lives in the palace with Prince Badou. They later attend Jake's birthday party at the Royal Palace though, like Dandy Andi, they are not used to the palace's tile floors and as a result have trouble standing up to the point of sliding around. The information they provided about Jake's past may prove valuable to Cornelius in his search to find out about Jake's origins. They call Badou and his family and friends "tame towners".
- Deb Mouse is a kind hearted mouse who first appeared in the episode "Spy Trap" that lives in the palace with her children.
- Lulu is Badou's little cousin, who is as excitable and fun-loving as he is. She has a giraffe doll named Jenna Giraffe. She idolizes her older cousin, and wants to spend most of her visits with him, much to his chagrin. Visually, Lulu resembles Isabelle, Babar's youngest child, when she was a little girl, thus suggesting that she is her daughter.
- Rhudi (voiced by Samantha Reynolds) is a rhinoceros who's prince of Rhinoland and Lord and Lady Rataxes' grandson and the son of Victor. He has a rivalry with Badou, like his grandfather had with Babar.
- Captain Darling is a crocodile sailor. Affable and likeable, she is often found at the Celesteville docks.
- Marabou Mail is a delivery marabou stork in Celesteville.
- Mr. Handy Hippo is a hippopotamus in Celesteville.
- Hoot (voiced by Tajja Isen) is a friendly wild spotted hyena living in the savanna and a friend of Dandy Andi. She is the only animal around who shares Jake's taste in food (Spinkweed sandwiches with toad drool dressing) and is a rampant practical joker. She is a good sport about it, though, generally finding jokes played on her just as funny as the ones she plays on others. She first appears in "Savannah Scramble", chasing after Badou and Jake who were on their way to help their friend Dandy Andi whose paw was stuck under a rock. Fearing she might hurt Andi as he was in no condition to defend himself, Badou and Jake try to lure her away only to end up trapped in a cave, though they are rescued by Hoot, only to find out that she is friendly and a fan of Andi to the point that she thinks he is cool. She helps Badou, and Jake get free and is surprised to find out that not only has she gotten to meet the famous Dandy Andi, but also Babar, King of the Elephants.
- Professor Rozeekeewhack (voiced by Ellen-Ray Hennessy) is a giraffe scientist who is incredibly smart but due to her size, also happens to be very clumsy as she is always banging her head on almost anything. She uses her blimp airship as a mobile laboratory called the Blimp-Lab. In "Point Guard", her Blimp-Lab is shown to be equipped with a vacuum nasal capable of sucking up all kinds of objects, though care must be taken as sucking up too much or something heavy like a boulder could weight down the Blimp-Lab and, as a result, prevent it from flying.
- Jabbsi is a legendary crested porcupine martial arts Master who was searching for the Needle Noggin, a legendary porcupine spiked helmet. In the past, he trained Babar in the martial arts. In "Fu Finder", Munroe and Badou seek him out so he can teach Munroe. While doing so they end up being followed by Prospero who wants the map they are carrying, though Jabbsi helps them defeat the bush pirate. Jabbsi is very perceptive as he easily identified Prince Badou and Munroe from having heard stories of their exploits. He becomes Munroe's Quill-Fu teacher. In "The Needle Noggin", it is revealed that Jabbsi found the cave where the Needle Noggin was located but realized he wasn't the one meant to claim it and decided to wait for the one who was. When Munroe and Badou eventually find the Needle Noggin, it was decided that Jabbsi would hold onto it until Munroe becomes a Quill-Fu Master.
- Heropotamus (voiced by Dwayne Hill) is a hippopotamus and an archaeologist. He calls Badou "pup".
- Queen Cleo is the elephant Queen of an ancient lost tribe of Elephants who lived long ago in the distant past. Many artifacts from the time in which she ruled can be found in Wind Song Canyon. Heropotamus, Babar, and Badou have discovered artifacts dating back to Queen Cleo's time, most of which are on display in the palace. Members of Cleo's tribe are said to be fond of bananas as rotten bananas can often be found in ruins and important sites dating from Cleo's time. In "Don't Push the Button", Babar and Badou help Heropotamus save a statue of Queen Cleo from collapsing after Badou accidentally triggers an ancient trap. In "Ayla", it is revealed that the descendants of Queen Cleo and her tribe had settled in the Hidden Valley which could only be accessed via the use of a horn known as the Passing Pipe. It is revealed that some aspects of her tribe's culture are shared by both Babar's family and the Green Elephant tribe such as Babar's Hiking Song, which is known among the Green Elephant tribe as an old song from Cleo's time, which Babar's family adopted at some point while being unaware of its connection to Queen Cleo. Since her three known descendants are Green Elephants, it can be assumed that Queen Cleo herself was green as well.
- Ayla (voiced by Nissae Isen) is the princess of the Green Elephant Tribe, daughter of King Grank, and sister of Candeen. She is also a descendant of Queen Cleo.
- King Grank is the King of the Green Elephant Tribe and father of Ayla and Candeen. He is also a descendant of Queen Cleo. He rules over the Green Elephant Tribe in the Hidden Valley. At first, he is distrustful of Babar, Badou, and Munroe due to them being outsiders. However, after Babar, Badou, and Munroe help Ayla save her father from some Tiger Snakes, he becomes friends with them. He later explains that in Queen Cleo's time the Valley was a place to hide during troubling times, though eventually some members of Cleo's tribe settled in the Valley to raise their families. After Grank laments that his people are not yet ready to explore the outside world yet, Babar promises to keep the tribe's Hidden Valley a secret until they are ready.
- Candeen is the prince of the Green Elephant Tribe, brother of Ayla, and son of King Grank. He is also a descendant of Queen Cleo.
- Warden Widebottom is a hippopotamus and a ranger who lives in a station.
- Mr. Chef Hippo is a hippopotamus cooking everything on food.
- Candy Cook is a hippopotamus chef who works at the candy shop.
- Avery O'Dare is a vulture and a pilot who flies an airplane called "wing-a-dinger".

=== Villains ===
- Sleek (voiced by Molly Johnson) is a wild black leopard, who is always trying to capture and devour the civilized animals who live in Celesteville, whom she calls "tame towners".
- Tiger Snakes are wild snakes that inhabit the jungle of the Hidden Valley, they are called tiger snakes due to their stripes. In "Ayla", two tiger snakes attack King Grank and Candeen. Badou, Babar, Munroe, and Ayla save them using an old trick of the green elephant tribe where they trap the two snakes in a hollow log.
- Kylus (voiced by Dan Chameroy) is a rogue wild lion in the savanna and a rival of Dandy Andi. He calls Badou and his family and friends "tame towners".
- Squeeze is a large wild Central African rock python who lives in the jungle.
- Wisdom Toad is a mythical toad said to have the answer to everything.
- Spider Queen is a wise giant spider lives in a cave.
- Prospero (voiced by Dan Chameroy) is a cape buffalo and a bush pirate. Officially banned from the kingdom, he still sneaks about doing bootleg activities, especially if they earn him a profit. He has a habit of talking to his snake-shaped walking stick, which he calls Sly. He calls Badou "boyoo".
- Captain Blacktrunk is a vicious elephant pirate who is the most evil villain of them all. He has a crew of other pirates.
- Snaggle-Eye Jack is a dastardly crocodile pirate who works alongside his best mate, Monkey Mate.
- Monkey Mate (voiced by Richard Binsley) is a dastardly monkey pirate who works under Snaggle-Eye Jack.
- Two-Toes Trent is a dastardly hippopotamus pirate who works under Blacktrunk.
- Rhino Rover is a dastardly rhinoceros pirate who works under Blacktrunk and Zork the Zebrateer.
- Zork the Zebrateer is a dastardly zebra pirate who works under Blacktrunk and the Rhino Rover.
- Mr. Floody (voiced by Richard Binsley) is a hippopotamus and a peddler who sells items in Celesteville. When he turns bad, he becomes a bad guy.
- Yaw & Shani (both voiced by Richard Binsley) are two troublemaking wild spotted hyenas. They appeared in "Savannah Surfing".

=== Original characters ===
- King Babar (voiced by Gordon Pinsent) is the king of Celesteville, Pom's father, and grandfather of Badou. He is called "Papi" by his grandson. When he was a little elephant, his mother was killed by the hunter while she tried to take Babar to safety.
- Queen Celeste (voiced by Dawn Greenhalgh) is Babar's wife and bride. She is the namesake of Celesteville, Pom's mother and grandmother of Badou. She is called "Nana" by her grandson.
- Cornelius (voiced by Chris Wiggins) is Babar's chief advisor and Prime Minister of Celesteville. A former army medic, he occasionally provides his emergency medical knowledge in a crisis such as when Dandy Andi's paw was trapped under a large rock in "Savannah Scramble". He is also the legal guardian of the orphaned kit, Jake, and spends his free time trying to learn more about Jake's origins in the hopes of locating Jake's real parents or relatives.
- Pom (voiced by Dan Lett) is Babar and Celeste's eldest son. As an adult, he became the father of Badou and is the husband of Periwinkle. He is also the city's architect and health and safety officer. He used to call his father "Father" and "Dad" but now calls him "Pop".
- Periwinkle (voiced by Molly Johnson) is Badou's mother, Babar's daughter-in-law and Pom's wife. She is the Celesteville doctor whose hobby is metal sculptures.
- Zephir (voiced by Jeff Pustil) is Babar's good friend and father of Chiku.
- Celesteville Royal Guards are the Royal Guards who protect Celesteville and the Royal Family. They are often seen guarding the palace or protecting the citizens of Celesteville from criminals such as Prospero and Blacktrunk. Munroe aspires to one day join the Royal Guard when he is older and is training to become one as a Junior Royal Cadet, a training program designed to prepare the next generation of the Royal Guard who are not yet old enough to join. They appear to be mostly Elephants, though it is implied that non-elephants like Munroe can join once they are old enough. They are apparently a force to be reckoned with, as criminals such as Prospero and antagonists such as Crocodylus have shown fear of them. Badou and his friends often take advantage of this to scare away villains or buy time for Babar and the real guards to arrive by pretending the Royal Guard is close via mimicking the sound of Guards marching and other tactics.
- General Huc (voiced by Aron Tager) is a general representing Monkeyville who is first appears in the book called "Babar and Zephir" and happens to be Zephir's father-in-law and Chiku's grandfather. In "Monkey Idol", it is revealed he is a talented rapper.
- Lord Rataxes (voiced by Adrian Truss) is the king of Rhinoland, father of Victor, and grandfather of Rhudi. Although normally shown to be commandeering, his wife can control him whenever she is upset.
- Lady Rataxes (voiced by Jayne Eastwood) is Lord Rataxes' wife, mother of Victor and grandmother of Rhudi. She is shown as bitter, although very protective over Rhudi. She appears to be different from the original series; Lord Rataxes was boastful and mean, and Lady Rataxes was much friendlier than her husband.

== Broadcast ==
Babar and the Adventures of Badou launched worldwidely on September 6, 2010, on ABC in Australia, and premiered on November 22 on YTV in Canada, but was later moved to Treehouse TV. The series has been sold to Disney Junior in the United States. It later aired on Qubo from December 30, 2019, to February 27, 2021, Univision starting from September 6, 2025 during the Planeta U block, M-net in South Africa and CITV and Tiny Pop in the UK. In Russia, it premiered on Carousel. In the Middle East, it premiered on Spacetoon (along with Baraem and Jeem TV). In Italy, the series premiered on Frisbee.
