= Babar's Museum of Art =

Book by Laurent de Brunhoff

Babar's Museum of Art (UK title: Babar's Gallery)
- Babar's Museum of Art cover
- Author: Laurent de Brunhoff
- Illustrator: Laurent de Brunhoff
- Cover artist: Laurent de Brunhoff
- Language: English
- Series: Babar the Elephant
- Genre: Children's literature
- Publisher: Harry N. Abrams, Inc.
- Publication date: 2003
- Publication place: United States
- Media type: Print (hardcover)
- Pages: 44 pp
- ISBN: 0-8109-4804-4
- OCLC: 52530997

Babar's Museum of Art (or Babar's Gallery) is a 2003 children's picture book written by Phyllis Rose de Brunhoff and illustrated by Laurent de Brunhoff as part of the Babar the Elephant series. The aim was to introduce different notable works of art found in museums around the world, mostly paintings, but also including sculptures. The human subjects in these artworks were re-interpreted as elephants.

== Plot summary ==
As the elephants in Celesteville took to motoring, the city's train station lost its original purpose. Queen Celeste decided to convert the station into an Art museum to showcase all the artworks she and Babar had collected over the years.

When the museum was opened, the adult elephants patiently explained to the young elephants different perspectives on art appreciation.

== Reception ==
Babar's Museum of Art was well received by critics, including a starred review from Publishers Weekly, who described the book as a "whimsical, wry caper". Kirkus Reviews referred to the elephants' adventure as "another classically plotless but curiously appealing outing". They added that the book serves "as a primer for both parents and children on how to manage a family visit to an art museum" as "it cheerily offers both good and bad examples to follow and avoid".

== Trivia ==
The conversion of the Celesteville's obsolete train station into a museum of art in the story is inspired by the conversion of Gare d'Orsay (Paris, France) to the now famous Musée d'Orsay. The design of the station in the story bears striking resemblance to the actual Gare d'Orsay, including the large clock at the facade of the station.

In real life, the cause of obsolescence of Gare d'Orsay was its platforms became too short as longer trains came into service. Gare d'Orsay had been built in 1900 to serve as terminus for the Chemin de Fer de Paris à Orléans (Paris-Orléans Railway). It ceased to cater to long-distance rail traffic in 1939 and served only suburban rail services.

The decision to convert it to a museum was announced in 1977. Listed as a historical monument in 1978, it re-opened as Musée d'Orsay in 1986.

A number of artworks featured in the story were inspired by actual artworks found in Musée d'Orsay.

== Annotations ==
The following is a list of the real artworks inspiring the illustrations in the book. The page numbers cited refer to the UK edition titled Babar's Gallery.

- page 14: Peter Paul Rubens, Rubens, his wife Helena Fourment, and their son Peter Paul (c. 1639).
- page 14: Édouard Manet, The Balcony (1868–1869).
- page 14: Leonardo da Vinci, Mona Lisa (circa 1503–1507).
- page 15: Raffaello "Raphael" Sanzio, St. Michael (Raphael) (c. 1505).
- page 15: Anthony van Dyck, Charles I and Queen Henrietta Maria with Charles, Prince of Wales and Princess Mary (1632).
- page 17: Diego Velázquez, Las Meninas (1656).
- page 18: Francisco Goya, Manuel Osorio Manrique de Zuñiga (1787–1788).
- page 19: Pieter Bruegel the Elder, The Harvesters (1565).
- pages 20–21: Eugène Delacroix, Liberty Leading the People (1830).
- page 22: Titian, Concert Champêtre (The Pastoral Concert) (c. 1510).
- page 23: Rembrandt Harmenszoon van Rijn, Aristotle with a Bust of Homer (1653).
- pages 24–25: Georges-Pierre Seurat, Sunday Afternoon on the Island of La Grande Jatte (1884–1886).
- page 26: Michelangelo di Lodovico Buonarroti Simoni, The Creation of Adam (1511).
- page 27: Paul Cézanne, The Cardplayers (1892).
- page 28: Vincent van Gogh, Self-portrait (1889, smoking a pipe).
- page 29: Jan van Eyck, Arnolfini Portrait (1434).
- pages 30–31: Sandro Botticelli, The Birth of Venus (Botticelli) (1486).
- page 32: Henri Julien Félix Rousseau, The Dream (1910).
- page 33: Salvador Dalí, Apparition of a Face and Fruit Dish on a Beach (c. 1938)
- page 34: Edvard Munch, The Scream (Skrik 1893).
- page 34: Pablo Picasso, Les Demoiselles d'Avignon (1907).
- page 35: René Magritte, The Human Condition (1935).
- page 36: Unknown, Venus de Milo.
- page 36: Joel Shapiro, Untitled.
- page 37: Edgar Degas, La Petite Danseuse de Quatorze Ans (Little Dancer of Fourteen Years, c. 1881)
- page 36-37: Aristide Maillol, female figure.
- page 37: Unknown, Ganesh (Hindu).
- page 37: Auguste Rodin, Monument to Balzac (1891–1898).
- page 38: John Singer Sargent, Portrait of Madame X (Virginie Amélie Avegno Gautreau, wife of Pierre Gautreau.) (1884).
- page 38: Mary Stevenson Cassatt, Mother and Child (c. 1905).
- page 38: James Abbott McNeill Whistler, Arrangement in Grey and Black: The Artist's Mother (Whistler's Mother) (1871).
- page 39: Édouard Manet, Le déjeuner sur l'herbe (The Luncheon on the Grass) (1862–1863).
- pages 40–41: Unknown, (Nubian) Temple of Dendur (c. 15 BC).
- pages 42–43: Hans Namuth, Jackson Pollock at work (1950).
- pages 42–43: Jackson Pollock, One: Number 31, 1950.
- page 44: Johannes Vermeer, Girl with a Red Hat (1668).
