= Thierry de Brunhoff =

French pianist and Benedictine monk

Thierry de Brunhoff (born 9 November 1934) is a French pianist and Benedictine monk.

== Early life and education ==
Thierry de Brunhoff is the son of Jean and Cécile de Brunhoff, creators of Babar the elephant, and younger brother of Laurent de Brunhoff and Mathieu de Brunhoff.

de Brunhoff started taking piano lessons from Alfred Cortot at age 11. Cortot was his greatest musical influence, as de Brunhoff testified several times:

"I owe him everything, everything that I can timidly be, I owe him" or "he took you with him, not into another world, but into the heart of the world [...] in overcoming yourself."

Thereafter, de Brunhoff also studied with Edwin Fischer, before becoming a teacher himself at the École normale de musique de Paris for over a decade. Among de Brunhoff's students was Hüseyin Sermet.

== Career ==
De Brunhoff is particularly known for his interpretations of Chopin and Schumann (one senses in this the very deep mark of his first master, Cortot), but his repertoire is very broad, from Beethoven to Debussy and Ravel, through Carl Maria von Weber, whose ostracism Brunhoff regrets, even the condescension with which he would be treated by musicians.

However, de Brunhoff's performance goes to Chopin, whom he praises in these terms:

Piano is Chopin. He was the one who best understood the possibilities of singing and the sound universe of the piano.

In 1974, de Brunhoff retired as a monk to the En-Calcat Abbey in the Tarn department and became Brother Thierry Jean. In this regard, he declared in 2004 in a letter to Rodolphe Bruneau-Boulmier:

It seemed to me that if God existed, then you had to dive in and give everything. To give everything was also to give music, since for me it contained everything since childhood. It was my universe, my breathing, my language, communion with others, the gift of self. God seemed to me to be more than all that or rather to contain all that, to be all that at the same time and at the same time, to wait for us to love Him. I believe that this expectation of God was decisive for me.

De Brunhoff was also a devoted fan of Maria Callas.

Pianist and radio producer Philippe Cassard devoted several series of programs to de Brunhoff on France Musique between 2008 and 2015.

== Discography ==
In 2004, EMI Classics published a double record in the series "Les Rarissimes", with interpretations of works by Chopin, Weber and Schumann, revealing this pianist who was almost forgotten at the time.
