= Phyllis Rose =

American literary critic, essayist, biographer, and educator

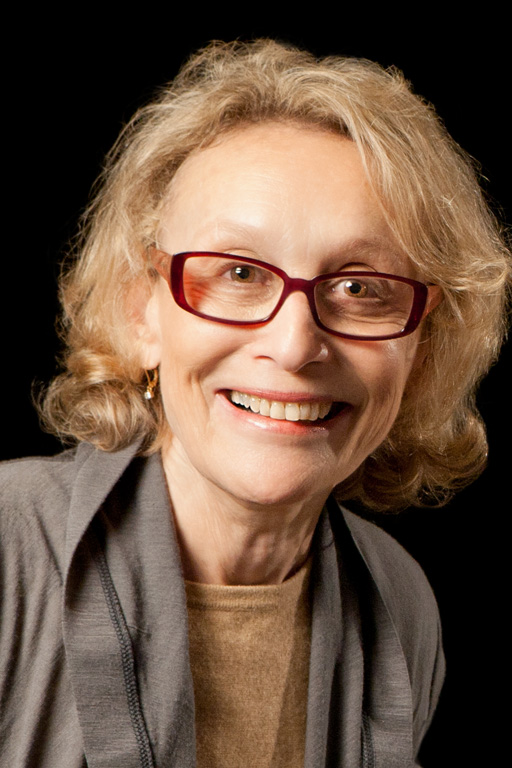
- Phyllis Rose portrait by Ed Lefkowicz
- Born: Phyllis Davidoff
- Occupation: Writer

Phyllis Rose (born October 26, 1942) is an American literary critic, essayist, biographer, and educator.

== Early life ==
Phyllis Rose was born Phyllis Davidoff, the third child of Eli and Minnie P. Davidoff, and spent her childhood on the South Shore of Long Island, attending Lawrence (NY) High School. She graduated from Radcliffe College in 1964 summa cum laude and spent the following year studying English literature at Yale University, for which work she holds an MA. She returned to Harvard to complete her graduate studies, specializing in nineteenth-century English literature and receiving a Ph.D. in 1970 with a dissertation on Charles Dickens, written under the direction of Jerome Hamilton Buckley. Rose is Jewish.

== Career ==
She began her teaching career in 1969 as an assistant professor of English at Wesleyan University in Middletown, CT, and rose progressively to associate professor and full professor with tenure in 1976. She remained on the faculty of Wesleyan until her early retirement in 2005, spending one year (1981–82) as a visiting professor of English at the University of California at Berkeley.

Rose's first book, Woman of Letters: A Life of Virginia Woolf, was a finalist for the National Book Award. Published in 1978, it was in the forefront of feminist re-evaluations of literary figures and generated a renewed interest among US literary critics in Virginia Woolf and the Bloomsbury Group.

Parallel Lives: Five Victorian Marriages, which considered the institution of marriage by exploring the marriages of five prominent Victorian writers, was published by Alfred A. Knopf in 1983. It details the intimate relationships and/or marriages of Jane Welsh and Thomas Carlyle, Effie Grey and John Ruskin, Harriet Taylor and John Stuart Mill, Catherine Hogarth and Charles Dickens, and George Eliot and George Henry Lewes. Anatole Broyard in The New York Times called it a “brilliant and original book.” In 2018, Haley Mlotek gave the book extravagant praise in a "Letter of Recommendation" published in the New York Times.

The research surrounding Rose's biography of the African-American dancer, Josephine Baker, titled Jazz Cleopatra, was supported by a fellowship from the John Simon Guggenheim Foundation and a grant from the National Endowment for the Humanities. It was published by Doubleday in 1989 and has since been translated into many languages.

Rose has published countless shorter essays throughout her career, some as a guest columnist for The New York Times in 1983–84, many for The American Scholar, on whose editorial board she has long served. Other essays and book reviews have appeared in The Atlantic, The Boston Globe, Vogue, The New York Times Book Review, USA Today, The Washington Post, The Yale Review, Preservation, Civilization, and The New Republic, among others. Her travel writing was regularly published by The Sophisticated Traveler section of The New York Times. Some of her essays were collected in Writing of Women (Wesleyan University Press, 1985) and some in Never Say Goodbye (Doubleday, 1991).

For The Norton Book of Women’s Lives (1993), a collection of diaries and memoirs, Rose selected the texts and wrote introductions to each author's work, as well as a general introduction to the volume. Library Journal said of it, “Because of the breadth and richness of these 61 selections, . . . this anthology is destined to become a classic.” The Hungry Mind Review called it a “magnificent, handsome, handful of an anthology.”

Since publishing The Year of Reading Proust: A Memoir in Real Time (Scribner, 1997), an account of her engagement with Marcel Proust's In Search of Lost Time, Rose has taken a long sabbatical from book-writing and devoted herself to photography, specializing in portraits. She has had two shows of her art work at the Lucky Street Gallery in Key West, Florida.

In 2014, Rose published The Shelf: From LEQ to LES, an account of reading all of the novels on a particular shelf in the stacks of the New York Society Library. A Kirkus reviewer explains Rose's method as follows: “She chose the shelf on the basis of a few self-imposed rules: Several authors needed to appear, and only one could have more than five books, of which she would read three; there would be both contemporary and older works; one book needed to be a classic that she had always wanted to read.” Elaine Showalter wrote that "Rose turns naturally to the tools of the contemporary reader—Wikipedia, Google, Facebook, Kindle, iPad—and moves easily between the shelf and the immediately accessible riches of the culture.

== Personal life ==
Rose has a son, Ted Rose, from her first marriage, which ended in 1975. In 1990, she married Laurent de Brunhoff, the French-born author and illustrator of the Babar the Elephant books. From 1985, Rose worked with him on the series. They lived in Key West, Florida and New York City until Laurent's death, aged 98, in 2024.

== Bibliography ==
- Woman of Letters: A Life of Virginia Woolf (Oxford Univ. Press, 1978)
- Parallel Lives: Five Victorian Marriages (Alfred A. Knopf Inc., 1983)
- Writing of Women: Essays in a Renaissance (Wesleyan Univ. Press, 1985)
- Jazz Cleopatra: Josephine Baker in Her Time (Doubleday, 1989)
- Never Say Goodbye: Essays (Doubleday, 1991)
- The Norton Book of Women's Lives (Editor) (W. W. Norton & Co., 1993)
- The Year of Reading Proust; A Memoir in Real Time (Scribner, 1997)
- The Shelf: From LEQ to LES: Adventures in Extreme Reading (Farrar, Straus and Giroux, 2014)
- Alfred Stieglitz: Taking Pictures, Making Painters (Yale University Press, 2019)
