= Le Jardin des Modes =

French magazine

Jardin des Modes
- Categories: Women's fashion magazine
- Frequency: Monthly
- First issue: August 1922
- Final issue: 1997
- Company: Condé Nast (1923–1954)
- Country: France
- Language: French
- ISSN: 0021-5457

Le Jardin des Modes was a French language women's fashion magazine published monthly in France between 1922 and 1997.

== History and profile ==
The magazine was first published in April 1922 as L'Illustration des Modes and aimed to a cutting edge group of fashion passionates. The founders were Lucien Vogel and his brother-in-law Michel de Brunhoff. It offered a mix of beautiful illustrations, pattern making examples and cooking recipes. In 1923 the magazine was acquired by Condé Nast.

The magazine published the first four Babar stories between 1931 and 1934, wrote by Jean de Brunhoff brother of the magazines editor Michel de Brunhoff.

Le Jardin des Modes did not publish its September and October 1939 issues due to the Phoney War, however resumed publication from November after permission from Condé Nast. However in June 1940 publication was suspended again and did not restart until 1944.

In the 1950s the magazine took the lead, making it the reference for ready to wear. Its title changed to Jardin des Modes during this period.

In 1954 the publishers Hachette bought it out and Jacques Moutin (from 1948 till 1961) becomes the creative director. A number of then unknown but soon to be famous photographers like Frank Horvat (from 1957), Jeanloup Sieff (from 1959), and Helmut Newton (from 1961) were published there.

Due to a severe financial crisis in the late 1960s, the magazine stopped being published in 1971. From 1977 to 1979 it was published again, with Milton Glaser as the art director. Jardin des Modes was a reference for the haute couture and ready to wear trends as well as being the place to find news about fashion, photography, design, architecture and art until 1997 when it ceased publication.

== Editions and editors ==
Country	Circulation dates	Editor	Start year	End year	Ref.
France (Jardin des Modes)	1922–1971	Michel de Brunhoff	1923	1933	
France (Jardin des Modes)	1922–1971	Maïmé Arnodin	1956	1958	
France (Jardin des Modes)	1977–1997	Alice Morgaine	1980	1997	
Germany (Jardin des Modes Deutsche)	1984–1991				
Switzerland (Jardin des Modes Schweiz)	1984–1991				
