= Babar's Kingdom =

Fictional Elephant-led animal kingdom in West Africa

- 'The Story of Babar' location
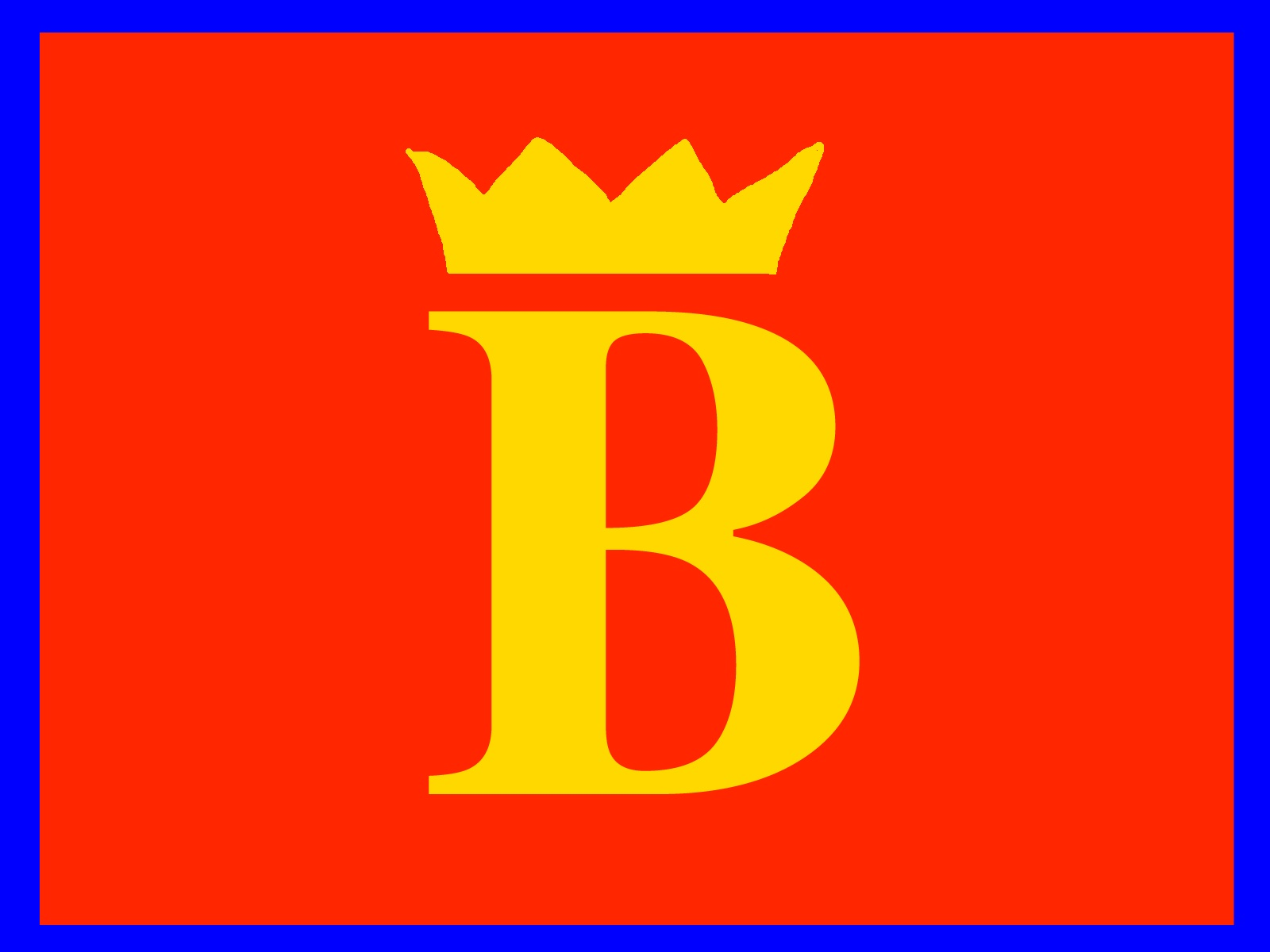
- Flag of Babar's Kingdom
- Created by: Jean de Brunhoff
- Genre: Children's books

In-universe information
- Type: Monarchy
- Locations: Celesteville (capital)

Babar's Kingdom, also known as the Elephant Country (French: le pays des Éléphants), is a fictional country supposedly in West Africa with French characteristics that is composed of elephants and other animals, which are usually bipedal and "civilized". The fictional nation was created by Jean de Brunhoff between 1931 and 1937. As its name implies, it is ruled by its first civilized citizen, Babar himself. The political regime is an elective monarchy, as described in the book The Story of Babar, which explains his election as king after the previous king dies from eating a bad mushroom. The court consists of King Babar, Queen Celeste, Royal Princes and Princesses (Pom, Flora, Alexander, Isabelle, and Badou), Arthur, Pompadour, Troubadour, and Cornelius, who also serves as Secretary of Defense and a Minister of Foreign Affairs. The Old Lady and her monkey Zephyr complete the court.

The capital is Celesteville, which was built by Babar and named after his Queen. The name of the city is sometimes used for the country.

A neighboring country is Rhino Land, ruled by the (sometimes) tyrannical King Rataxes. The relations between Celesteville and Rhinoland have occasionally flared into war, although it is usually just a statement and peace is restored before much damage or casualties are suffered. The elephant army is under the direct command of King Babar (and likewise the rhino army is under the command of Rataxes). Some stories feature the two countries working together against common threats, such as when the area is infiltrated by poachers, and the two will help each other during times of need or crisis. In the television series, after working together to defend the region against a group of poachers, the two countries, along with other nearby animal-controlled territories, form a united jungle coalition, a concept similar to the United Nations, which prevents major conflicts between the animal countries thereafter. The militaries of the countries are considered simple and rely mostly on simple hand weaponry, such as spears and staffs. Guns are strictly forbidden by all the animals, due to their disgust with the poachers who would use the weapons. Not even Rataxes dares to think of arming his country with such things after seeing their effects first-hand.

The countries do seem to have at least some trade and commerce with each other, as well as with other kingdoms and countries, both animal- and human-controlled.

== Celesteville ==
Celesteville is the capital of Babar's Kingdom. The city is ruled by King Babar and named after his wife, Queen Celeste.

Celesteville is described differently in several places in the series. In the original incarnation, Babar built Celesteville after he returned from France, and began Westernizing his kingdom. He named his new city Celesteville, after the female elephant he had fallen in love with. The city lies in the middle of a jungle plain, surrounded by mountains, and is connected to a nearby sea or ocean, and is a port city.

Early on, like the rest of Babar's Kingdom, Celesteville is primarily populated by elephants. Minorities include monkeys, lions, crocodiles, hippos, and at least one human. Though they are minority populations, they are treated as equals with the elephants and are given the same rights, liberties, and respects that the elephants have and are fully incorporated into the elephant society. However, this has drastically changed later on, with the city having a vast number of other animals besides elephants, possibly due to the taming of wild jungle animals.

Known citizens of Celesteville include:

- Babar – king of Celesteville.
- Celeste – Babar's wife and cousin and the queen of the realm.
- Arthur – Celeste's brother, Babar's 2nd cousin.
- Pom, Flora, Alexander, and Isabelle – Babar's children. Pom, Flora and Alexander are triplets. Isabelle and Alexander are the youngest. Pom is the oldest. Several years later, he grew up and became the father of Badou.
- Cornelius – an elephant, he is the prime minister of the kingdom. He wears a military uniform and has the role of an entire cabinet, acting as a Minister of Defense and a Minister of Foreign Affairs. During his time in the army, he served as a medic. In Babar and the Adventures of Badou, he is the legal guardian of the orphaned Jake and spends his free time trying to learn more about Jake's origins in the hope of finding Jake's real family.
- Pompadour – an elephant who dresses in 18th century attire, including wig. He usually acts as a Chamberlain to Babar.
- Troubadour – a companion to Pompadour, but he doesn't speak.
- Zephir – a monkey and a personal friend of Babar. He is the father of Chiku and son-in-law of Monkeyville's General Huc.
- Madame (The Old Lady) – a woman whom Babar befriended in France and returned with him when he became king. She taught him many things, was kind and caring, and in many ways became a surrogate mother of sorts to him. She is the only mentioned human who lives in Celesteville. Since she does not appear in Babar and the Adventures of Badou, it is possible that she has either moved away or more likely has since died (justified that she was very elderly when Babar was a child and likely passed away since), as Pom has now grown up and became a father and Babar himself is a grandfather of Badou by this point.
- General Huc – a general representing Monkeyville and happens to be Zephir's father-in-law and Chiku's grandfather.
- Truffles – a palace cook.
- André – a circus elephant who comes traveling through Celesteville along with a circus and later comes to live with Babar. Later on he joins the circus again.
- Marie – Flora's friend who ran off when Flora wanted to keep playing hopscotch instead of skipping.
- Samantha – thought to be Celeste's friend, Celeste greets her right before her riding accident with Zephir.
- Felipe – training to be the leading man in Mademoiselle Soretoza's ballet, but quit after being fed up with Soretoza's behavior.
- Ursula – Celeste's friend and an actress in All Played Out.
- Badou – Babar's grandson and Pom's son, he is the main protagonist of Babar and the Adventures of Badou.
- Chiku – Zephir's daughter and the maternal granddaughter of Monkeyville's General Huc. She is one of Badou's close friends.
- Munroe – a young porcupine and one of Badou's close friends. Dreams of one day becoming a member of the Royal Guard and is currently training to become one as a Junior Royal Cadet, a training program to prepare children who aspire to join the Royal Guard when they grow up.
- Zawadi – a female zebra and one of Badou's friends.
- Jake – an orphaned young fox who was adopted by Cornelius. As a young kit on the Savannah, he was briefly raised by three friendly lionesses named Hannah, Ramsey, and Skylar, although a monsoon washed him out of their den and Jake eventually ended up in Celesteville where he met Badou and was adopted by Cornelius. Hopes to learn more about where he came from and find his real parents, though still cares for Cornelius and enjoys playing with Badou and his friends.
- Cory – Flora's husband and Babar's son-in-law.
- Lulu – Babar's granddaughter, Badou's cousin.
- Periwinkle – the town's doctor; Pom's wife, Babar's daughter-in-law and Badou's mother.
- Crocodylus – ambassador of the Alligator and Crocodile kingdom.
- Dilash and Tersh – Crocodylus's nephews, brought over to make him seem more important. Dilash is the oldest of the two and is both mean and scheming like his uncle. Tersh is kind and friendly, as well as a little bit naïve. Despite his relation to Crocodylus, Tersh usually goes along with his uncle's plans due to his naïveté, which Dilash and his uncle take advantage of. He eventually becomes friends with Badou and the other kids, and at times even helps foil his uncle's schemes. On one occasion, however, he asks Badou to keep his Uncle's actions a secret as he Crocodylus is still Tersh's family. In some episode, Badou and his friends occasionally join Tersh on his visits to the slogs of the Crocodile and Alligator kingdom.
- Gallop – a wise old tortoise who lives just outside Celesteville.
- Miss Strich – the ostrich and a palace teacher, guide for tourists, and also organizes most of Celesteville's events.
- Prospero – a cape buffalo and a bush pirate. Officially banned from the kingdom, but still sneaks about.
- Dandy Andi – a wild lion who lives in the savanna but they joined the palace.
- Sleek – a wild black leopard who lives in the deep jungle who chases civilized animals.
- Hannah, Ramsey and Skyla – the trio of wild lionesses who live in the savanna but they raised from Jake as a kit.
- Hoot – a wild hyena who lives in the savanna and a friend of Dandy Andi.

By Babar's decrees, a number of public institutions, schools, hospitals, parks, museums, libraries, an opera house, and other works of infrastructure have been built. The kingdom has a rail line, and Celesteville itself is connected to a large body of water (presumably a sea or ocean), making it a port city. Vehicle traffic is common in the kingdom, especially Celesteville, but most of the residents still seem to prefer to travel on foot or by bicycle, since many of the city's amenities seem to be fairly close to each other. The city is wired with electricity and phone service, which are commonplace, and there also appears to be a limited amount of radio and television services. Fresh water and sewage systems are also abundant. The kingdom has a policy of free press, and is serviced in large part by newspaper. Literacy and schooling is high, and it appears that nearly 100 percent of the population is educated. Crime, poverty, and the penal system are rarely featured in the series, and are presumed to be rare in Babar's Kingdom though criminals like Prospero and the pirate Blacktrunk occasionally appear to cause trouble. The Royal Guard acts as both the Kingdom's Royal Guard and occasionally functions as Celesteville's police force likely because of crime being a rarity in the kingdom and are often called in to defend the palace and Celesteville from attack or theft by the likes of Prospero and Blacktrunk. Besides the palace, it also protects valuable objects and other important places around Celesteville.

Babar and his family, as well as his advisors and some royal staff, live in a large palace in the center of the city. The palace is the kingdom's largest structure, contains several stories, dozens of rooms, and a very large garden complex. It also houses a home for the Old Lady, the first building completed in Celesteville.
