= Cécile de Brunhoff =

French storyteller

- Born: Cécile Sabouraud; 16 October 1903; Paris, France
- Died: 7 April 2003 (aged 99); Paris, France
- Education: École Normale de Musique de Paris
- Occupation: Writer
- Spouse: Jean de Brunhoff (husband)
- Children: Laurent, Mathieu, and Thierry de Brunhoff
- Writing career
- Genre: Children's literature
- Notable work: Babar the Elephant

Cécile de Brunhoff (née Sabouraud; 16 October 1903 – 7 April 2003) was a French storyteller and the creator of the original Babar story. She was also a classically trained pianist.

The Babar books began as a bedtime story de Brunhoff invented for her children, Mathieu and Laurent, when they were four and five years old, respectively. She was trying to comfort Mathieu, who was sick. The boys liked the story of the little elephant who left the jungle for a city resembling Paris so much that they took it to their father Jean de Brunhoff, a painter, and asked him to illustrate it. He turned it into a picture book, with text, and was published by a family-run publishing house, Le jardin des modes. Originally, it was planned that the book's title page would describe the story as told by Jean and Cécile de Brunhoff. However, she had her name removed; according to her son Mathieu, this was due to modesty, and her opinion that her contribution was minor.

Because of the role she played in the genesis of the Babar story, many sources continue to refer to her as the creator of the Babar story.

Her husband Jean went on to write and illustrate six more Babar children's books made the series popular worldwide. Her son Laurent de Brunhoff carried on the family tradition of writing and illustrating the Babar books.
