= Laurent de Brunhoff =

French author and illustrator (1925–2024)

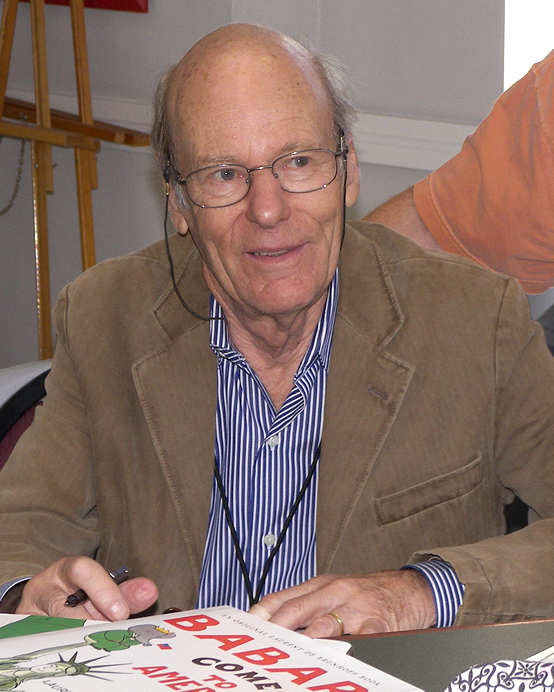
- De Brunhoff at the 2008 Texas Book Festival
- Born: 30 August 1925; Paris, France
- Died: 22 March 2024 (aged 98); Key West, Florida, US
- Citizenship: France; United States
- Education: Académie de la Grande Chaumière
- Occupation: Artist
- Spouse(s): Marie-Claude Bloch (m. 1951; div. 1990) Phyllis Rose (m. 1990)
- Children: Anne de Brunhoff; Antoine de Brunhoff
- Relatives: Jean de Brunhoff (father); Cecile de Brunhoff (mother); Thierry de Brunhoff (brother)
- Writing career
- Genre: Children's literature
- Notable work: Babar the Elephant

Laurent de Brunhoff (French: [loʁɑ̃ də bʁynɔf]; 30 August 1925 – 22 March 2024) was a French author and illustrator, known primarily for continuing the Babar the Elephant series of children's books that was created by his father, Jean de Brunhoff.

== Early life ==
Laurent de Brunhoff was born in Paris on 30 August 1925. His brothers are Mathieu and Thierry de Brunhoff. Thierry is a concert pianist who is known particularly for his interpretation of Chopin; he became a Benedictine monk in 1974.

The children's classic Babar began as a bedtime story that Cécile de Brunhoff told her young sons, Laurent and Mathieu, in 1930, when they were five and four years old, respectively. They loved the story about the little elephant and told their father, Jean de Brunhoff, about the story. Jean de Brunhoff, who was an artist, drew pictures for them of the elephant world their mother had described and eventually created a book, Histoire de Babar (The Story of Babar), which was published in 1931 by Le Jardin des Modes, a family-run publishing house. Jean de Brunhoff created six more Babar books, but two of them were only partially colored when he died.

== Career ==
After World War II, Laurent, who inherited his father's artistic gift, trained at the Académie de la Grande Chaumière under the painter Othon Friesz and began living as an artist in Montparnasse. But, wishing to maintain his tie to his father and the imaginative world of his childhood, he turned back to the character his father had drawn and taught himself to draw in his father's style. What Christine Nelson calls their "intergenerational artistic partnership" had begun even earlier, when Laurent was a teenager, and was asked to do the color for several pages that his father had left in black and white. His own first Babar book, Babar et ce coquin d’Arthur (Babar’s Cousin, That Rascal Arthur), was published in 1946 when Laurent was 21.

De Brunhoff went on to publish nearly 50 more Babar books, as well as creating children's books with characters of his own invention, Bonhomme and Serafina, among others.

== Personal life and death ==
De Brunhoff was married to Marie-Claude Bloch in 1951 and together they had two children, Anne, born 1952, and Antoine, born 1954. They separated in 1985 and divorced in 1990.

In 1985 de Brunhoff moved to the United States, living in Middletown, Connecticut, with writer and Wesleyan University professor Phyllis Rose. They married in 1990 and lived in New York and Key West, Florida.

De Brunhoff died of a stroke in Key West on 22 March 2024, at the age of 98.

== Honors ==
De Brunhoff, who held both French and American citizenship, was made an Officier de l'Ordre des Arts et des Lettres, and a Chevalier of the Légion d'Honneur.

== Exhibitions ==
There have been major exhibitions of his work and his father's work in 1981 at the Centre Culturel du Marais in Paris, in 1983-84 in the United States (Minneapolis Institute of Art, Baltimore Museum of Art and the Toledo Museum of Art, among others), in 1987 in Japan, and in 1989-90 at the National Academy of Design in New York and the Royal Ontario Museum in Toronto, among others.

In 2008, the Morgan Library and Museum in New York mounted a major exhibition of original drawings and manuscripts by Jean and Laurent de Brunhoff, for which a catalogue was published, Drawing Babar: Early Drafts and Watercolors by Christine Nelson that included an essay about Babar by Adam Gopnik, which was also published in The New Yorker. It celebrated the gift to the Morgan by Laurent de Brunhoff and his brothers, Mathieu and Thierry, of the manuscript of Jean de Brunhoff's first book, Histoire de Babar (The Story of Babar, 1931) and by Laurent of the manuscript of his first book, Babar et ce coquin d'Arthur (Babar's Cousin: That Rascal Arthur, 1946).

There have been smaller shows at many museums throughout the United States, including the Art Institute of Chicago, the Dixon Gallery in Memphis, the Speed Art Museum in Louisville, and the Davison Art Center of Wesleyan University in Connecticut.

A show was scheduled for 2011–2012 at the Musée des Arts Decoratifs in Paris. In addition, de Brunhoff has exhibited frequently at the Mary Ryan Gallery in New York, which represents his work. The work of Jean and Laurent de Brunhoff has also been the subject of books by Anne Hildebrand, Jean and Laurent de Brunhoff: The Legacy of Babar (New York: Twayne, 1991) and by Nicholas Fox Weber, The Art of Babar (New York: Harry N. Abrams, 1989).

== Bibliography ==
- Babar's Cousin: That Rascal Arthur. New York: Random House, 1948. (Babar et ce coquin d'Arthur. Paris: 1946)
- Babar's Picnic. New York: Random House, 1949.
- Babar's Visit to Bird Island. New York: Random House, 1952.
- Babar's Fair. New York: Random House, 1955.
- A tue-tete. Paris: Juillard, 1957.
- Babar and the Professor. New York: Random House, 1957.
- Serafina the Giraffe. Cleveland: World Publishing Co., 1961.
- Serafina's Lucky Find. Cleveland: World Publishing Co., 1962.
- Babar's Castle. New York: Random House, 1962.
- Captain Serafina. Cleveland: World Publishing Co., 1963.
- Anatole and His Donkey. New York: Macmillan, 1963.
- Babar's French Lessons. New York: Random House, 1963.
- Babar Comes to America. New York: Random House, 1965.
- Babar's Spanish Lessons. New York: Random House, 1965.
- Bonhomme. New York: Pantheon, 1965.
- Babar Learns to Cook. New York: Random House, 1967.
- Babar Loses His Crown. New York: Random House, 1967.
- Babar's Games. New York: Random House, 1968.
- Babar's Moon Trip. New York: Random House, 1969.
- Babar's Trunk. New York: Random House, 1969.
- Babar's Birthday Surprise. New York: Random House, 1970
- Gregory and the Lady Turtle in the Valley of the Music Trees. New York: Pantheon, 1971.
- Babar's Other Trunk. New York: Random House, 1971.
- Babar Visits Another Planet. New York: Random House, 1972.
- Babar the Pilot. London: Methuen, 1973. (Babar Aviateur. Paris: Hachette, 1971)
- Meet Babar and His Family. New York: Random House, 1973.
- Babar's Bookmobile. New York: Random House, 1974.
- Bonhomme and the Huge Beast. New York: Pantheon, 1974.
- Babar and the Wully-Wully. New York: Random House, 1975. (Babar et le Wouly-Wouly. Paris: Hachette)
- Babar Saves the Day. New York: Random House, 1976.
- Babar's Mystery. New York: Random House, 1978. (Babar et les quatre voleurs. Paris: Hachette)
- The One Pig with Horns. New York: Pantheon, 1979.
- Babar the Magician. New York: Random House, 1980.
- Babar's Little Library. New York: Random House, 1980
- Babar and the Ghost. New York: Random House, 1981. (Babar et le fantôme. Paris: Hachette)
- Babar's Anniversary Album. New York: Random House, 1981.
- Babar's A.B.C. New York: Random House, 1983.
- Babar's Book of Color. New York: Random House, 1984.
- Babar's Counting Book. New York: Random House, 1986.
- Babar's Little Girl. New York: Random House, 1987. (Babar et sa fille Isabelle. Paris: Hachette)
- "Christmas with Babar & Baby Isabelle," a four-page illustrated story described as "a new Babar story, written exclusively for the readers of Woman's Day." Woman's Day, 22 December 1987, p. 61.
- Babar's Adventures, Calendar for 1988. New York: Stewart, Tabori & Chang, 1988.
- Babar's Little Circus Star. New York: Random House, 1988.
- Babar in Hollywood, Calendar for 1990. New York: Stewart, Tabori & Chang, 1989.
- Babar's Busy Year. New York: Random House, 1989.
- Babar in History, Calendar for 1991. New York: Stewart, Tabori & Chang, 1990.
- Isabelle's New Friend. New York: Random House, 1990.
- Babar's Battle. New York: Random House, 1992. (La victoire de Babar. Paris: Hachette)
- Babar's Rescue. New York: Random House, 1993. (Babar et la cité perdue. Paris: Hachette)
- Babar and the Succotash Bird. New York: Harry N. Abrams, Inc., 2000. (Babar et l'oiseau magicien. Paris: Hachette)
- Babar's Yoga for Elephants. New York: Harry N. Abrams, 2002. (Babar: le yoga des éléphants. Paris: Hacette)
- Babar's Museum of Art. New York, Harry N. Abrams, 2003. (Le musée de Babar. Paris: Hachette)
- Babar's World Tour. New York: Harry N. Abrams, 2005. (Le tour du monde de Babar. Paris: Hachette)
- Babar's USA. New York: Harry N. Abrams, 2008.
- Babar's Celesteville Games. New York: Harry N. Abrams, 2011.
- Babar and His Family (An adaptation of Meet Babar and His Family. 1973). New York: Harry N. Abrams, 2012.
- B Is for Babar: An Alphabet Book (An adaptation of Babar's A.B.C.. 1983). New York: Harry N. Abrams, 2012.
- Babar and the New Baby (An adaptation of Babar's Little Girl. 1987). New York: Harry N. Abrams, 2013.
- Babar's Guide to Paris. New York: Harry N. Abrams, 2017. (final book)

== Sources ==
- Jean and Laurent de Brunhoff, Babar's Anniversary Album, with an introduction by Maurice Sendak and family photos and autobiographical captions by Laurent. New York: Random House, 1981.
