= List of Babar and the Adventures of Badou episodes =

The following is a list of episodes for the CGI animated series, Babar and the Adventures of Badou. The series is co-produced by Nelvana, TeamTO, Guru Studio (season 1) and Pipeline Studios (season 1) in association with The Clifford Ross Company, TF1, YTV, and LuxAnimation. The series premiered on November 22, 2010 on YTV in Canada, but was later moved to Treehouse TV. It has been sold to various channels worldwide.

== Series overview ==
Season	Episodes	Originally aired	
Season	Episodes	First aired	Last aired
1	26	February 14, 2011	January 4, 2012
2	26	March 25, 2013	January 17, 2014
3	13	July 10, 2014	January 2, 2015

== Episodes ==
=== Season 1 (2010–12) ===
No. overall	No. in season	Title	Original release date	Prod. code
1	1	"Spy Trap/Sneazles"	February 18, 2011	107
"Spy Trap": Badou with his friends try to find a spy who continues to steal documents from the palace. "Sneazles": A rapid moving case of the 'Sneazles' causes Babar and his kingdom to be ill, which leads ambassador Crocodylus to try to become King.
2	2	"Tutu Badou/Hidden Courtyard"	February 16, 2011	123
"Tutu Badou": Badou is chosen to star in a dance recital in front of everyone, however nerves make him think twice about it. "Hidden Courtyard": Badou and his friends try to find the hidden courtyard, located in the palace and try to stop Crocodylus from finding it first.
3	3	"Memory Mayhem/Soaped!"	February 17, 2011	110
"Memory Mayhem": Badou seeks advice about which memory he should use for a competition from a wise turtle before Crocodylus uses it first. "Soaped!": Badou and Chiku try to make their friend Jake smell nicer, but being a fox, he thinks it's okay to smell bad.
4	4	"The Thunderclap/The Celesteville Junior Marching Band"	February 15, 2011	112
"The Thunderclap": Pom attempts to teach his son Badou how to perform his 'thunderclap', but Badou can't seem to master the art. "The Celesteville Junior Marching Band": The ambassador Crocodylus tries to disrupt the royal marching band procession for Lord and Lady Rataxes upcoming visit.
5	5	"Windrunners/Bivouwacky"	February 21, 2011	119
"Windrunners": Badou and Babar find themselves lost in the jungle and start to be pursued by Sleek. "Bivouwacky": On a rainy day, Badou and his friends pretend to go on a camping trip inside the palace.
6	6	"Copy Cat/Heropotamus"	March 1, 2011	104
"Copy Cat": Zawadi wants to be different from every other Zebra and with the assistance of Andi the lion, she finds out that she really is one of a kind. "Heropotamus": Babar reads a story of Heropotamus and his quest for the hidden golden banana to Badou, Chiku and Jake which leads them on a quest to find the banana themselves.
7	7	"Lulu Time/Chocolate and Banana Soup"	February 22, 2011	120
"Lulu Time": Badou's little cousin, Lulu, arrives for a short holiday, however Badou becomes worried when Lulu goes missing. "Chocolate and Banana Soup": Celeste is ill with the sniffles, so Badou and Chiku gather ingredients to cook a special soup for her.
8	8	"The Quillinator/Truffle Snuffle"	March 2, 2011	101
"The Quillinator": Lord and Lady Rataxes are being royal guests at the Palace, Munroe sets up traps in the palace, believing Lord Rataxes is plotting against Badou. "Truffle Snuffle": Badou and Jake hunt down truffles in the jungle for Celeste, but Lady and Lord Rataxes hatch a plan to steal them.
9	9	"Kite Fight/Zoomerblimps"	March 3, 2011	102
"Kite Fight": Chiku builds a kite for Munroe to enter in a contest with Dilash, but Chiku fails to finish her work. "Zoomerblimps": Badou and his classmates try to earn their 'wings' by flying their zoomerblimp balloons in a derby competition.
10	10	"Gone Wild/Operation Secret Suitcase"	February 23, 2011	111
"Gone Wild": Badou and Chiku are being tested in the jungle by Andi and their teacher, Miss Strich. Andi falls into a pit trap. "Operation Secret Suitcase": With Cornelius asking Jake to meet him at 3'o clock and moving his bags, Jake assumes he is moving away from the palace and tries to stop Cornelius from reaching the blimp.
11	11	"Jake And The Big Book/Blacktrunk's Magic Stone"	February 24, 2011	106
"Jake And The Big Book": Jake tries to have an adventure worthy enough to be written down in King Babar's memory book, but his adventure is ruined by Sleek. "Blacktrunk's Magic Stone": Jake believes he has found a magic rock that grants wishes which used to belong to the pirate Blacktrunk, a lie invented by Badou to make Jake happy.
12	12	"The Key/Grotto For One"	February 14, 2011	115
"The Key": While spring cleaning, Babar and Badou find a mysterious treasure chest. Badou's impatience leads to the key being broken, and he tries to keep the key safe from the ambassador until they reach the tinker. "Grotto For One": Badou and his friends battle with the crocodiles over control over the Grotto.
13	13	"Monkey Camp/Bad Bounce"	February 25, 2011	114
"Monkey Camp": Chiku and Zephir invite Badou to Monkey camp, but finds that it's hard to do the activities as an elephant. "Bad Bounce": Badou invites Tersh to play on with him on the trampoline, but a scheming Crocodylus tries to use this to get his claws on a golden friendship badge from Babar.
14	14	"The Brave Guy/Starring Ms. Strich"	March 4, 2011	103
"The Brave Guy": Munroe tries to prove his courage to the group. "Starring Ms. Strich": Encouraged by Badou and his friends, Miss Strich decides to join a play.
15	15	"Bob/Villains"	February 28, 2011	108
"Bob": A favorite tree, Bob, is scheduled for demolition after being struck by lightning during a storm. "Villains": Badou and Munroe warn Sleek when they discover a bush pirate, Prospero in the jungle.
16	16	"Flower Power/Hee Honk"	March 14, 2011	116
"Flower Power": Badou enlists Zawadi's help to find a rare jungle flower. "Hee Honk": Zawadi loses the zebra book of stripes, and suspects Dilash of taking it.
17	17	"Ruby Rumpus/Dandy Andi"	March 21, 2011	109
"Ruby Rumpus": Babou and Rhudi team up to try to find Lady Rataxes' missing ruby. "Dandy Andi": Badou invites Dandy Andi to the palace, but he just can't seem to grasp the idea of city life.
18	18	"Birdie Bonk/Badou on the Ball"	March 28, 2011	113
"Birdie Bonk": After Pom twisted his knee, Badou partners with Miss Strich in a 'birdie bonk' match against the Crocodiles. "Badou on the Ball": Badou becomes the host of the banana ball after Babar and Pom were injured, but his bossiness prevents Chiku and Zawadi from helping him.
19	19	"Neighborly Nice Day/Savanna Scramble"	January 4, 2012	105
"Neighborly Nice Day": In order to make it to the neighborly nice day celebrations, King Babar decides to take a dangerous shortcut to make up time, much to Badou's worry. "Savanna Scramble": While trying to rescue Dandy Andi, Badou and Jake get chased by an unknown animal.
20	20	"Toy Trouble/The Royal Portrait"	April 4, 2011	118
"Toy Trouble": Rhudi and Lady Rataxes tries to get Chiku's new toy. "The Royal Portrait": Badou must choose between helping his team win or fulfilling royal tradition.
21	21	"Coconut Jinx/Adventurephant"	April 11, 2011	121
"Coconut Jinx": Someone is stealing all of Celesteville's coconuts. "Adverturephant": The legendary explorer, Heropotamus, comes to Celesteville.
22	22	"The Dino Egg/Stone Stealer"	July 15, 2011	117
"The Dino Egg": Badou tells Tersh that dinosaurs still exist, with disastrous results. "Stone Stealer": Prospero tries to steal ancient stone carvings from Windrunner Valley with a jackhammer.
23	23	"Sneaking Past/Crash N' Dash"	May 9, 2011	122
"Sneaking Past": Badou and Chiku go looking for Pom's old skates. "Crash N' Dash": When Lord Rataxes' Balloon goes down in scavenger territory, it is a race against time to claim his treasure back before the crocs do.
24	24	"The Day of the Jake/Point Guard"	May 16, 2011	124
"The Day of the Jake": Badou and Chiku try to help Jake find out what day he came to Celesteville on. "Point Guard": Munroe tries to prove his bravery to the royal guards.
25	25	"Dimday Pirates/No Foolin'"	January 3, 2012	125
"Dimday Pirates": Badou, Munroe and Chiku try to collect all the Dimday plants, unaware of the Consequences for the wildlife. "No Foolin": Hoots practical jokes start to annoy other animals on the savanna.
26	26	"Moon and Star and Sun/The Gold Mines of Gaxx"	March 7, 2011	126
"Moon and Star and Sun": Badou, Chiku and Rhudi try to locate the legendary Gold Mines of Gaxx. "The Gold Mines of Gaxx": The gang explores the lost mines. Note: These two episodes split into two parts and this is the last episode where Dallas Jokic voices Prince Badou due to hitting puberty.

=== Season 2 (2013–14) ===
No. overall	No. in season	Title	Original release date
27	1	"Rescueteers Go Go Go!/Blacktrunk's Greatest Treasure"	May 27, 2013
"Rescueteers Go Go Go!": Badou learns the first thing about leading is watching your step. "Blacktrunk's Greatest Treasure": Badou tries to help when Jake becomes obsessed with stories of pirate loot.
28	2	"Tunnels O' Fun/Old Tusks"	May 28, 2013
"Tunnels O' Fun": A backyard camp-out with Hoot becomes a real adventure when Badou discovers a secret tunnel under the Palace. "Old Tusks": After an accident, Badou and Jake drive Cornelius crazy by trying to protect him.
29	3	"Sky Croc/Crocodile Kerfuffle"	August 7, 2013
"Sky Croc": Badou has to rescue Tersh from a runaway zoomerblimp. "Crocodile Kerfuffle": Badou is suspicious that a big statue is really a 'Trojan Horse' given by treasure-seeking Crocodylus.
30	4	"New Tusks/The Song Staff"	March 25, 2013
"New Tusks": Impatient to grow up, Badou tries lotions, potions, and adventurous notions to get his tusks to sprout. "The Song Staff": Badou discovers a magical staff that can lead him to an unexpected treasure if he uses it wisely.
31	5	"The Zip-Zap/No Small Parts"	August 9, 2013
"The Zip-Zap": Badou and his friends must find a way to keep the out-of-control digging machine from destroying a rare fossil. "No Small Parts": After losing an audition to Rhudi, Badou must foil a Crocodile plot to steal the Rhino King's crown.
32	6	"Hyenaaaah!/Beetle Mania"	May 29, 2013
"Hyenaaaah!": During the Hot Air Hootenanny, Badou and the Rescueteers contend with a series of false alarms from Hoot. "Beetle Mania": Badou hunts a rare singing beetle as a gift for Lady Rataxes in the hopes she'll act more kindly toward Queen Celeste.
33	7	"Musiquest/Boo-Nanas"	August 13, 2013
"Musiquest": Badou believes an ancient music box is the key to a treasure sought by Rhinos, Elephants and Crocodiles. "Boo-Nanas": Badou and Chiku investigate reports of a monster plaguing Monkeyville.
34	8	"Stink Patrol/Pirates of the Plain"	July 15, 2013
"Stink Patrol": Badou asks Jake to de-stinkify the Palace for an upcoming Royal Rhino visit. "Pirates Of The Plain": Captain Badou tries to referee an argument between First Mate Chiku and Best Mate Munroe as they race the Crocs for pirate loot.
35	9	"A Bird in the Hand/Slogging Through"	March 27, 2013
"A Bird in the Hand": Badou and Munroe help Ms. Strich thwart Prospero's plans to capture a rare bird. "Slogging Through": Badou must rely on an uncertain Tersh when the two become lost in the Crocodile Slogs.
36	10	"The Unhidden Courtyard/The Rhino Rule"	August 16, 2013
"The Unhidden Courtyard": Badou needs Tersh's help to keep Ambassador Crocodylus from discovering the location of the Hidden Courtyard. "The Rhino Rule": After Badou saves Rataxes from danger, an ancient law dictates that the Rhino Lord must become Badou's servant.
37	11	"Message in the Wind/Elephants Don't Jump"	March 28, 2013
"Message In The Wind": While searching for lost packages accidentally dumped in the jungle, Badou and Chiku must figure out how to warn Celesteville of an approaching storm. "Elephants Don't Jump": Badou and his pals challenge the Monkeyville team to a game of jumpball.
38	12	"Babar the Pirate/Stripes vs. Scales"	July 16, 2013
"Babar The Pirate": While tracking down the owner of a talisman, Badou discovers evidence that his Pappy might be a pirate. "Stripes Vs. Scales": Badou and Zawadi must get in touch with their 'inner Crocodile' when they become contestants in the CrocoCup Games.
39	13	"Badou's Best Adventure/The Council of Crowns"	May 30, 2013
"Badou's Best Adventure": While on a quest to return an artifact, Badou struggles to shine in the shadows of the world's greatest adventurers. "The Council Of Crowns": Badou attempts to give Andi a Kingly makeover to win him membership to the prestigious Council of Crowns.
40	14	"Saving Sleek/The Wrong Roar"	March 26, 2013
"Saving Sleek": Badou learns that charging in about own exploits is a real hero's behavior. "The Wrong Roar": When Badou and his friends try to roar like real lions they are so convincing that a rogue lion named Kylus shows up for a fight.
41	15	"The Elefan Club/Sloggy Boggy"	August 23, 2013
"The Elefan Club": After saving General Huc's life, Badou finds himself saddled with an annoying fan club while on a trip to Monkeyville. "Sloggy Boggy": Badou and Babar hunt for a Slog monster that has sent the terrified Crocs scurrying to safety.
42	16	"Avast Chance/Who's The Boss?"	July 17, 2013
"Avast Chance": While trying to discover a secret pirate camp, Badou and Dilash are recruited to join Blacktrunk's crew. "Who's The Boss?": Badou learns that bossiness isn't a helpful skill when he, Rhudi, Queen Celeste, and Lady Rataxes crash a balloon.
43	17	"Prank Prince/Starbreaker"	March 29, 2013
"Prank Prince": Rhudi's attempt to blame Badou for a rash of practical jokes backfires with high-flying comic results. "Starbreaker": Jake is convinced that his big wish 'for a hundred more wishes' is the cause of a shooting star crashing to earth.
44	18	"Brawler Boot Camp/Celeste Rocks"	May 31, 2013
"Brawler Boot Camp": Munroe finds himself up to his quills in Crocs when Badou volunteers them to become members of the Boss' Brawler bodyguards. "Celeste Rocks": Badou begins to regret inviting Zawadi along on the traditional First-Day-of-Summer Hike.
45	19	"Flying Blind/There's a Sap for That"	September 11, 2013
"Flying Blind": Badou must complete a flight to Monekyville when pilot Babar doesn't loses his prescription goggles. "There's a Sap for That": Badou and his pals search for a stickersap tree so they can make a glue to repair Lord Rataxes's ridiculous new crown and tell Babar the truth about what happened and make him feel better.
46	20	"Banana Shenanigans/Monkeyville Zoom"	January 10, 2014
"Banana Shenanigans": Badou must replace Lady Rataxes' birthday sculpture before Crocodylus substitutes one of his own. "Monkeyville Zoom": Badou and Babar compete against other family flight crews in the Monkeyville Zommerblimp Rally.
47	21	"Totem Talkers/The Wisdom Toad"	January 13, 2014
"Totem Talkers": Badou and Rhudi compete to discover the Truth Talkers Totem. "The Wisdom Toad": Badou must prevent Crocodylus from using a fake fortune telling toad to get himself appointed Boss of the Slogs.
48	22	"Chillesteville/Captain Crewless"	July 18, 2013
"Chillesteville": When Chiku's skating rink-making machine goes out of control, Badou, Chiku, and Babar must stop it from freezing Celestville. "Captain Crewless": Badou comes to regret leaving his pals behind when he runs afoul of Blacktrunks's pirates.
49	23	"Operation Secret Switcheroo/Forget Me Nut"	September 12, 2013
"Operation Secret Switcheroo": The Rescueteers plan an elaborate pastry 'heist' to save Ms. Strich from feeding her inedible pies to the Palace residents. "Forget Me Nut": Badou and Chiku must find a cure to free Babar, Celeste and everyone else from amnesia in order to stop Crocodylus from taking over Celesteville.
50	24	"Fu Finder/The Needle Noggin"	January 16, 2014
"Fu Finder": Badou help Munroe seek out Jabbsi, a legendary Master who can teach him the secrets of Quill-Fu. "The Needle Noggin": Badou accompanies Munroe on a quest to find an ancient Porcupine artifact.
51	25	"Smelling Strong/Rhudi's Rhinoteers"	January 17, 2014
"Smelling Strong": Badou helps Jake search for the Fountain of Strength which Jake believes will make him as strong as ten Rhinos. "Rhudi's Rhinoteers": Mayhem results for Badou and his pals when Rhudi creates a rival Rescueteer team.
52	26	"King Badou vs. the Pirates Part 1 & Part 2"	July 19, 2013
"King Badou vs. the Pirates Part 1 & Part 2": A series of mishaps force Badou needs help to assume the throne when Blacktrunk and his pirates attack the city. Note: These two episodes split into two parts.

=== Season 3 (2014–15) ===
No. overall	No. in season	Title	Original release date
53	1	"Kitty Cornered/The Moon Cat's Tale"	July 10, 2014
"Kitty Cornered": Badou must find a way to make Andi and Sleek work as a team as they try to rescue Babar from the thieving Prospero. "The Moon Cat's Tale": Badou and Babar go on a moonlight midnight adventure to investigate a legend of a mysterious savanna cat.
54	2	"Kings Can Dance/Picnic Pirates"	August 19, 2014
"Kings Can Dance": Badou unknowingly leads Crocodylus to a magical flute that makes Babar and Lord Rataxes dance to his tune. "Picnic Pirates": Badou's anniversary idea, a quiet picnic for his grandparents is almost ruined by sneaky pirates trying to plunder the gifts.
55	3	"Fair Is Fair/Savanna Surfing"	August 22, 2014
"Fair Is Fair": When Crocodylus unfairly takes away Babar's wings. Badou helps Babar earn back his wings by passing a test. "Savanna Surfing": While Andi goes wind-wheeling with Babar, Badou learns looking after the wildlifers isn't as easy as Andi makes it look.
56	4	"The Gunkifier/Gold Bug"	December 30, 2014
"The Gunkifier": Babar and Badou investigate what is causing the lake to be filled with icky gunk. "Gold Bug": Badou discovers a rare beetle that is covered in gold dust, and accidentally touches off a gold rush.
57	5	"Badou Unmasked/Slog Soaring"	January 1, 2015
"Badou Unmasked": Badou rallies his friends to keep Blacktrunk from stealing a priceless artifact during a Palace-wide masquerade ball. "Slog Soaring": Tersh helps Badou adapt in the obstacle-laden Slogs to stop a cheating Crocodylus from winning the zoomerblimp derby.
58	6	"Jumpball Bu/Mission Zoompossible"	August 21, 2014
"Jumpball Bu": Badou learns how to be a good sport when he and Tersh are teamed in Monkeyville's wacky Jumpball Championship. "Mission Zoompossible": Badou and the gang have to help Ms. Strich fly so she can teach a group of hatchings that have decided she is their mom.
59	7	"Monkey Idol/Quill Fu To Do"	July 9, 2014
"Monkey Idol": To help Chiku win a singing contest, Badou convinces her to seek coaching from the wildest singer in the jungle: Sleek. "Quill Fu To Do": Badou and Munroe have a big argument, and wonder if this means they won't be friends any more.
60	8	"Monkey's Paw Paw/Babarathalon"	August 20, 2014
"Monkey's Paw Paw": A jewel that is the pride of the Monkeys goes missing, Badou is certain Crocodylus is the thief. Everyone believes Badou, and the croc hunt is on. "Babarathalon": Badou learns the value of good deeds during a crazy race that pits him against a cheating Lady Rataxes.
61	9	"Turtle Trek/Fume Blooms"	July 11, 2014
"Turtle Trek": Badou assumes a trek with Gallop will be slow and boring, but he discovers the ancient turtle is still young at heart. "Fume Blooms": Badou inadvertently causes the Palace to become infested with the world's stinkiest flowers.
62	10	"Bad Egg/Horville the Pirate"	August 18, 2014
"Bad Egg": Badou's investigation into a rash of Palace thefts uncovers an unlikely culprit: Ms. Strich. "Horville the Pirate": While following a map found in a child's memory book, Badou and Munroe have a run in with pirates.
63	11	"I Heart Ms. Strich/Mind Games"	December 31, 2014
"I Heart Ms. Strich": Badou and his friends think Ms. Strich needs a sweetheart, but Crocodylus is definitely NOT the one they had in mind. "Mind Games": When Badou and Chiku play a little trick on Dilash, it causes a very big problem for everyone.
64	12	"Don't Press the Button/Ayla"	December 29, 2014
"Don't Press the Button": Badou's inability to resist temptation almost destroys a statue of old Queen Cleo. "Ayla": Badou and Babar discover a hidden valley full of green Elephants.
65	13	"Getting Creative/The Hidden Valley"	January 2, 2015
"Getting Creative": When Crocodylus disfigures Babar's painting of Lady Rataxes, Badou tries to fix it - but only succeeds in making it worse. "The Hidden Valley": Badou, Chiku, and Ayla have to save Ayla's home when pirates find a way into the hidden valley. Note: This is the last episode where Drew Adkins voices Prince Badou due to hitting puberty and last episode of the entire series.
