= Michel de Brunhoff =

French journalist (1892–1958)

Pierre Claude Michel de Brunhoff (6 February 1892 – 14 May 1958), known professionally as Michel de Brunhoff was a French journalist, notably serving as the editor-in-chief of Le Jardin des Modes and Vogue Paris.

== Early life ==
Pierre Claude Michel de Brunhoff was born on 6 February 1892 in Paris, France, to Maurice de Brunhoff and Marguerite Meyer-Warnod. He is the brother of the French writer and illustrator, Jean de Brunhoff.

== Career ==
Brunhoff's first notable appointment was as editorial secretary of La Gazette du Bon Ton, working at the publication from its launch in 1912. He would continue to work closely with the Gazette du Bon Ton founder Lucien Vogel throughout the rest of his career. Brunhoff became editor-in-chief of Le Jardin des Modes in 1922.

In 1925, Condé Nast put Brunhoff in charge of managing British Vogue. In 1929, Brunhoff was appointed editor-in-chief of Vogue Paris.

Following the death of his brother Jean de Brunhoff, Brunhoff arranged for the final two Babar novels to be coloured and published (in 1938 and 1940 respectively).

Publication of Vogue Paris was put on hold in 1940 after permission to publish the magazine was not granted by the occupying Nazi authorities. Brunhoff created l'Album de la Mode du Figaro in 1942, the magazine was based in Monte Carlo and aimed to fill the market gap left from the closure of Vogue Paris. Regular contributors to Vogue including Solange d'Ayen, Paul Valéry and illustrators Bernard Blossac, Pierre Mourgue, and Eduardo Benito contributed to Brunhoffs new publication. Brunhoff exited the publication after the Summer 1943 number. After creating the publication the Brunhoff became viewed as a "defender" of Parisian couture due to the risks he took to create the publication, such as crossing the demarcation line to collect drawings and texts from Paris.

Brunhoff returned as editor-in-chief of Vogue Paris for the first issue post-liberation of France. Brunhoff was also named director of the French operations of Vogue in 1946. In 1954, Brunhoff left Vogue Paris.

In 1955, Brunhoff introduced aspiring designer Yves Saint Laurent (who he had first met in 1953) to Christian Dior.

=== Legacy ===
Brunhoff's notes to staff were included in the Vogue Paris, 1920-2020 100th anniversary exhibition at the Palais Galliera.

== Death ==
Brunhoff died on 14 May 1958 and is buried at Montmartre Cemetery.

Media offices
| Preceded by Mainbocher | Editor-in-Chief at Vogue Paris; 1929–1954 | Succeeded by Edmonde Charles-Roux |
