= Lord Rataxes =

Babar the Elephant character

- Babar the Elephant character
- First appearance: Le Voyage de Babar (1932)
- Created by: Jean de Brunhoff
- Voiced by: Peter Ustinov (1968; TV special); Les Lye (1985; TV special); Allen Stewart-Coates (1989-1999; TV series and movie); Charles Kerr (1989; movie); Adrian Truss (2010-2015; TV series)

In-universe information
- Species: Rhinoceros
- Gender: Male
- Occupation: King
- Spouse: Lady Rataxes
- Children: Victor
- Relatives: Rhudi (grandson)
- Nationality: African

Rataxes, or Lord Rataxes, is a fictional rhinoceros who is a character in the Babar franchise. Although he is the monarch de jure of his kingdom, called Rhinoland, his more intelligent wife, Lady Rataxes, is the de facto ruler. He is often surrounded by his rhinoceros guards. These guards also keep watch for cars, to collect tolls on the roads that pass through the kingdom. It is said that King Rataxes got his name from these tolls, so it is questionable if "Rataxes" is his real name or a sobriquet.

Rataxes and his general, Pamir are seen wearing Morions and gorgets in The Travels of Babar.

King Rataxes also has a son, Victor (who is, in fact, close friends with Babar's children), and is attended by a servant, Basil, who is also his adviser (and is often seen as being wiser and much more competent than Rataxes, and thus often is one that gets things done in the kingdom). Basil and the other rhinos show much loyalty to Rataxes, though they will sometimes run away and leave him to face a situation alone if they feel threatened or overwhelmed. Under the rule of King Rataxes, Celesteville and Rhinoland have occasionally gone to war with each other, though peace is restored before much damage or casualties are suffered.

The rhino army is under the command of Rataxes (and the elephant army under the command of King Babar). The two countries have also been known to work together against common threats, such as when the area is infiltrated by poachers, and the two will help each other during times of need or crisis. In the television series, after working together to defend the region against a group of poachers (including the one who shot Babar's mother), the two countries, along with other nearby animal-controlled territories, form a "united jungle coalition", a concept similar to the United Nations, which prevents the outbreak of major conflicts between the animal countries thereafter. The militaries of the countries are considered simple and rely mostly on simple hand weaponry, such as spears and staffs. Guns are strictly forbidden by all the animals, due to their disgust with the poachers who would use the weapons. Not even Rataxes dares to think of arming his country with such things, after seeing their effects first-hand.

Rhinoland is made up of primarily jungle territory, and borders neighboring Celesteville (presumably somewhere in Africa). The capital city of Rhinoland consists mainly of large stone pyramid structures, which house most government offices, as well as the Rataxes living quarters, and quarters for the army, along with a series of storage facilities and dungeons. Much of the rhino population live in houses and structures nearby. Though perhaps not as technologically or culturally "refined" as their elephant counterparts, the rhinos are all fairly educated, and both Lord and Lady Rataxes do care about the safety and well-being of their citizens, and will go to great lengths to help them, even if it sometimes means asking their elephant counterparts for assistance.

Rataxes' portrayal has differed slightly in the animated TV series, where he is portrayed as cold-hearted and power-hungry, particularly when contrasted with the leadership style of Babar. In Babar: The Movie he is portrayed even more negatively, as ruthless and warlord-like.
