= Babar the Elephant =

Fictional character

- Cover of the first Babar story, Histoire de Babar (Story of Babar), published 1931
- First appearance: Histoire de Babar, 1931
- Created by: Jean de Brunhoff
- Voiced by: Peter Ustinov (1968–1971; 2 TV specials); Jim Bradford (1985; TV special); Gordon Pinsent (1989–2015; 2 TV series and movie); Dan Lett (1999–2000; movie and TV series); Gavin Magrath (young; 1989; TV series and movie); Kristin Fairlie (young; 1999; movie); Daniel Davies (2005; video game)

In-universe information
- Aliases: Babar, Doctor of Letters, King of the Elephants
- Species: African bush elephant
- Gender: Male
- Occupation: King
- Spouse: Celeste
- Children: Pom, Flora, Alexander and Isabelle
- Relatives: Arthur (brother-in-law), Badou (grandson), Lulu (granddaughter), Franklin (grandson), Periwinkle (daughter-in-law), Cory (son-in-law)
- Nationality: African

Babar the Elephant
- Author: Jean de Brunhoff
- Country: France
- Language: French
- Genre: Children's literature
- Published: 1931; 95 years ago–present
- Media type: Print (hardcover and paperback); Audiobook

Babar the Elephant (UK: /ˈbæbɑːr/ BAB-ar, US: /bəˈbɑːr/ bə-BAR, French: [babaʁ]) is an elephant character named Babar who first appeared in 1931 in the French children's book Histoire de Babar by Jean de Brunhoff.

The book is based on a tale that Brunhoff's wife, Cécile, had invented for their children. It tells the story of a young African elephant, named Babar, whose mother is killed by a big game hunter. Babar the Elephant escapes, and in the process leaves the jungle in exile, visits a big city, and returns to bring the benefits of civilization to his fellow elephants. Just as he returns to his community of elephants, their king tragically dies from eating a poisonous mushroom. Because of his travels and civilization, Babar is chosen king of the elephant kingdom. He marries his cousin, Celeste (French: Céleste), and they subsequently have children and teach them valuable lessons.

== Story synopsis ==
After Babar's mother is shot and killed by a hunter, he flees the jungle and finds his way to an unspecified big city with no particular characteristics. He is befriended by the Old Lady, who buys him clothes and hires him a tutor. Babar's cousins Celeste and Arthur find him in the big city and help him return to the Elephant realm. Following the death of the King of the Elephants, who had eaten a poisonous mushroom (the illustrations indicate that it is a fly agaric), a council of old elephants approach Babar, saying that as he has "lived among men and learnt much", he would be suitable to become the new King. Babar is crowned King of the Elephants and marries his cousin, Celeste.

In Jean de Brunhoff's second Babar book, The Travels of Babar, when the married couple leave by balloon on their honeymoon:

... stormy winds down the balloon on an island, and yet again will the royal couple escape by whale, be marooned on an even smaller island and be rescued by a passing ocean liner only to be turned over to an animal trainer and put to work in a circus. And when they escape and return home, what awaits them but war with the rhinoceroses.

It was sparked when Arthur tied a firecracker to the tail of Lord Rataxes. Babar wins the war by having the elephants paint monster faces on their backsides, which cause the frightened rhinoceroses to run away. After the victory celebrations, the book ends with Babar, Celeste and the Old Lady sitting together and discussing how Babar can rule wisely and make all the elephants happy.

In the third book, Babar the King, Babar founds the city of Celesteville. After many dromedaries are found, they help with building the city. Each elephant citizen is given a job to do. Once the city is built, everyone celebrates. However, problems arise; the Old Lady is bitten by a snake, and Cornelius' home catches fire. Babar has a dream where he is visited by Misfortune and other demons which are chased away by elephant angels representing Courage, Hope, and other virtues. The morning after the hopeful dream, the Old Lady and Cornelius make full recoveries.

Among Babar's other associates in the various incarnations of the series are the monkey Zephir, the old elephant counsellor Cornelius (also later Pompadour who was created for the Babar television series), Babar's cousin Arthur, and Babar's children, Pom, Flora, and Alexander. A younger daughter, Isabelle, is later introduced. The Old Lady comes to live in the Kingdom as an honored guest.

Besides his Westernizing policies, Babar engages in battle with the warlike rhinoceroses of a hostile bordering nation, led by Lord Rataxes. Much later, in Babar and the Adventures of Badou, Pom grows to become the father of Prince Babar II (known as Badou).

== History ==
In 1931, Jean de Brunhoff introduced Babar in Histoire de Babar, and Babar enjoyed immediate success. In 1933, A.A. Milne introduced an English-language version, The Story of Babar, in Britain and the United States.

Before his death in 1937, Jean de Brunhoff published six more stories. His son Laurent de Brunhoff, also a writer and illustrator, carried on the series from 1946, beginning with Babar et Le Coquin d'Arthur.

An animated television series, Babar was produced in Canada by Nelvana Limited and the Clifford Ross Company, running from 3 January 1989 to 5 June 1991, with 65 episodes. An additional 13 episodes aired in 2000. The character has also appeared in a number of films. The first two of Jean de Brunhoff's Babar books have inspired two major concert works: L'Histoire de Babar, le petit éléphant (The Story of Babar, the Little Elephant) by Francis Poulenc in 1940; and The Travels of Babar (Le Voyage de Babar) by Raphael Mostel in 1994. In 2010, an animated sequel and spin-off, Babar and the Adventures of Badou, was released, introducing new characters, including Badou, Babar's grandson and Pom's son. It takes place several years after the original series.

== Influence and legacy ==
Babar, who likes to wear a bright green suit, introduces a very French form of Western civilization to the elephants, and they soon dress in Western attire. The attention to stylish clothing perhaps reflects the fact that the original publisher of the books was Editions du Jardin des Modes, owned by Condé-Nast. The Babar books were the first Condé-Nast publications not specifically about fashion.

Author Maurice Sendak described the innovations of Jean de Brunhoff:

Like an extravagant piece of poetry, the interplay between few words and many pictures, commonly called the picture book, is a difficult, exquisite, and most easily collapsible form that few have mastered....Jean de Brunhoff was a master of this form. Between 1931 and 1937 he completed a body of work that forever changed the face of the illustrated book.

The series has over 100 licensees worldwide, and the "Babar" brand has a multi-generational following. A global cultural phenomenon, whose fans span generations, Babar stands along with Disney's Mickey Mouse as one of the most recognized children's characters in the world. There are now over 30,000 Babar publications in over 17 languages, and over 8 million books have been sold. Laurent de Brunhoff's Babar's Yoga for Elephants is a top seller in the U.S. with over 100,000 copies sold to date. The Babar series of books are recommended reading on former First Lady Laura Bush's national reading initiative list. All 78 episodes of the TV series are broadcast in 30 languages in over 150 countries, making Babar one of the largest distributed animation shows in history. Babar has been a perennial favourite for years at the White House Easter Egg Roll.

Since 2001, the Babar franchise has been owned by Corus Entertainment's Nelvana in conjunction with the artist, Clifford Ross.

Babar made a nameless appearance in The New Traveller's Almanac (part of The League of Extraordinary Gentlemen series). Babar and his elephants escort Mina Murray and Allan Quatermain through the African jungle. Mina considers them "civilized and gentle", but Allan denies that their leader is really wearing a crown.

In the 1988 comedy film Coming to America, the Joffer royal family have a pet elephant named "Babar". In 1993, de Brunhoff's elephant inspired the BaBar experiment, an international hadron physics collaboration based in the SLAC National Accelerator Laboratory at Stanford University.

In 2008-2009 the Morgan Library & Museum held an exhibition which focused artwork titled Drawing Babar: Early Drafts and Watercolors.

== Criticism ==
Herbert R. Kohl and Vivian Paley have argued that, although superficially delightful, the stories can be seen as a justification for colonialism. Others argue that the French civilization described in the early books had already been destroyed by World War I and the books were an exercise in nostalgia for pre-1914 France. Ariel Dorfman's The Empire's Old Clothes is another critical view, in which he concludes: "In imagining the independence of the land of the elephants, Jean de Brunhoff anticipates, more than a decade before history forced Europe to put it into practice, the theory of neocolonialism".

In April 2012, Babar's Travels was removed from the shelves by library staff in East Sussex in response to parental complaints for what was perceived as stereotypes of Africans. Jean de Brunhoff's son Laurent de Brunhoff was embarrassed by stereotypical Africans and Native Americans in Babar's Picnic and asked the publisher to withdraw it.

A more sympathetic view is expressed in the 2008 New Yorker article "Freeing the Elephants", in which Adam Gopnik argues it "is not an unconscious expression of the French colonial imagination; it is a self-conscious comedy about the French colonial imagination and its close relation to the French domestic imagination. The gist ... is explicit and intelligent: the lure of the city, of civilization, of style and order and bourgeois living is real, for elephants as for humans". He concludes that the satisfaction derived from Babar is based on the knowledge that "while it is a very good thing to be an elephant, still, the life of an elephant is dangerous, wild, and painful. It is therefore a safer thing to be an elephant in a house near a park".

== Books ==
Jean de Brunhoff wrote and illustrated seven Babar books; the series was continued by his son, Laurent de Brunhoff.

Jean de Brunhoff's Babar books (1931–1941), and the titles of the English translations, were:

- Histoire de Babar (1931) – The Story of Babar
- Le Voyage de Babar (1932) – The Travels of Babar, or Babar's Travels
- Le Roi Babar (1933) – Babar the King
- L'ABC de Babar (1934) – A.B.C. of Babar
- Les vacances de Zéphir (1936) – Zephir's Holidays, Zephir's Vacation, or Babar and Zephir
- Babar en famille (1938) – Babar and His Children, or Babar at Home
- Babar et le père Noël (1941) – Babar and Father Christmas

Laurent de Brunhoff's books (1948–2017) (selected list):

- Babar et ce coquin d'Arthur (1948) – Babar's Cousin: That Rascal Arthur
- Pique-nique chez Babar (1949) – Babar's Picnic
- Babar dans l'Île aux oiseaux (1952) – Babar's Visit to Bird Island
- Babar au cirque (1952) – Babar at the Circus
- La fête à Celesteville (1954) – Babar's Fair
- Babar et le professeur Grifaton (1956) – Babar and the Professor
- Le château de Babar (1961) – Babar's Castle
- Je parle anglais avec Babar (1963) – Babar's English Lessons (published as French Lessons in English)
- Babar Comes to America (1965)
- Je parle allemand avec Babar (1966) – Babar's German Lessons
- Je parle espagnol avec Babar (1966) – Babar's Spanish Lessons
- Babar Loses His Crown (1967)
- Babar Visits another Planet (1972)
- Babar and the Wully-Wully (1975)
- Babar Learns to Cook (1978)
- Babar the Magician (1980)
- Babar's Little Library (1980)
- Babar and the Ghost (1981)
- Babar's Anniversary Album (1982)
- Babar's ABC (1983)
- Babar's Book of Color (1984)
- Babar's Counting Book (1986)
- Babar's Little Girl (1987)
- Babar's Little Circus Star (1988)
- Babar's Busy Year (1989)
- Babar's Rescue (1993)
- Le Musée de Babar (2002) – Babar's Museum
- Babar Goes to School (2003)
- Babar's Museum of Art (2003)
- Babar's Book of Color (2004)
- Babar's Busy Year (2005)
- Babar's World Tour (2005)
- Babar's Yoga for Elephants (2006)
- Babar's USA (2008)
- Babar's Celesteville Games (2011)
- Babar on Paradise Island (2014)
- Babar's guide to Paris (2017)

English translations of the original Babar books are routinely republished in the UK and in the US, individually and in collections.

Other English-language titles about Babar include the following:

- Babar Comes to America, New York: Random House, 1965
- Babar Learns to Cook, New York: Random House, 1967
- Babar Loses His Crown, New York: Random House, 1967
- Babar's Games, New York: Random House, 1968
- Babar's Fair, New York: Random House, 1969
- Babar Goes Skiing, New York: Random House, 1969
- Babar's Moon Trip, New York: Random House, 1969
- Babar's Trunk, New York: Random House, 1969
- Babar's Birthday Surprise, New York: Random House, 1970
- Babar's Other Trunk, New York: Random House, 1971
- Babar Visits Another Planet, New York: Random House, 1972
- Meet Babar and His Family, New York: Random House, 1973
- Babar's Bookmobile, New York: Random House, 1974
- Babar and the Wully-Wully, New York: Random House, 1975
- Babar Saves the Day, New York: Random House, 1976
- Babar's Mystery, New York: Random House, 1978
- Babar's Little Library, New York: Random House, 1980
- Babar the Magician, New York: Random House, 1980
- Babar's Anniversary Album, New York: Random House, 1981
- Babar's A.B.C, New York: Random House, 1983
- Babar's Book of Color, New York: Random House, 2009
- Babar and the Ghost, Easy to Read Edition. New York: Random House, 1986
- Babar's Counting Book, New York: Random House, 1986
- "Christmas with Babar & Baby Isabelle," a four-page illustrated story described as "a new Babar story, written exclusively for the readers of Woman's Day." Woman's Day, 22 December 1987, p. 61.
- Babar's Little Circus Star, New York: Random House, 1988
- Babar's Busy Year, New York: Random House, 1989
- Isabelle's New Friend, New York: Random House, 1990
- Babar and the Succotash Bird, New York: Harry N. Abrams Inc., 2000

== Films and television ==
- Les Aventures de Babar (French language TV series) (1968)

Bill Melendez Productions:

- The Story of Babar the Little Elephant (1968)
- Babar the Elephant Comes to America (1971)

Atkinson Film-Arts:

- Babar and Father Christmas (1986)

Nelvana Productions:

- Babar (1989–91; 2001)
- Babar: The Movie (1989)
- Babar: King of the Elephants (1999)
- Babar and the Adventures of Badou (2010–2015)

== Video games ==
The American game company Mindscape released Babar and the Royal Coin Caper for the PC in 2005, Both Babar and Cornelius are voiced by Daniel Davies and Dave Pender. The Danish game company The Game Factory published Babar to the Rescue for the Game Boy Advance in 2006.
