= Jean de Brunhoff =

French artist and writer

- Born: 9 December 1899; Paris, France
- Died: 16 October 1937 (aged 37); Montana, Switzerland
- Education: Académie de la Grande Chaumière
- Occupation: Artist
- Spouse: Cécile Sabourourd
- Children: Laurent, Mathieu, and Thierry
- Relatives: Michel de Brunhoff (brother)
- Writing career
- Genre: Children's literature
- Notable work: Babar the Elephant

Signature
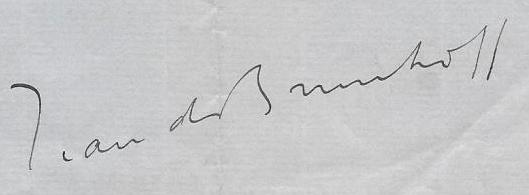

Jean de Brunhoff (French: [ʒɑ̃ də bʁynɔf]; 9 December 1899 – 16 October 1937) was a French writer and illustrator remembered best for creating the Babar series of children's books concerning a fictional elephant, the first of which was published in 1931.

== Early life ==
De Brunhoff was the fourth and youngest child of Maurice de Brunhoff, a publisher, and his wife Marguerite. He attended Protestant schools, including the prestigious École Alsacienne. De Brunhoff joined the army and was sent to the front when World War I was almost over. Afterward, he decided to be a professional artist and studied painting at the Académie de la Grande Chaumière in Paris. In 1924, De Brunhoff married Cécile Sabouraud, a talented pianist, and they had three sons: Laurent (1925–2024) and Mathieu (born 1926), and Thierry (born 1934).

== Babar ==
The Babar books began as a bedtime story that Cécile de Brunhoff invented for their sons, Mathieu and Laurent, when they were four and five years old, respectively. She was allegedly trying to comfort Mathieu, who was sick. The boys liked the story of the little elephant who left the jungle for a city resembling Paris so much that they asked their father, a painter, to illustrate it. He made it into a picture book, with text, which was published by a family-owned publishing house, Le Jardin des Modes. Originally, it was planned that the book's title page would describe the story as told by Jean and Cécile de Brunhoff. However, she had her name omitted. Due to the role she played in the genesis of the Babar story, some sources refer to Cécile as the creator of the Babar story.

After the first book Histoire de Babar (The Story of Babar), five more titles followed before de Brunhoff died of tuberculosis at age 37. He is buried in Père Lachaise Cemetery in Paris.

After de Brunhoff's death, his brother Michel, who was the editor of the magazine Vogue Paris, oversaw the publication in book form of Jean's two last books, Babar and His Children and Babar and Father Christmas, both of which had been drawn in black and white for a British newspaper, The Daily Sketch. Michel arranged for the black and white drawings to be painted in color, with the then-thirteen-year-old Laurent helping with the work. The French publishing house Hachette later bought the rights to the Babar series. The first six Babar books were reprinted with millions of copies sold around the world.

== Babar's revival ==
Soon after the end of World War II, Laurent, who had become an artistic painter like his father and had also studied at the Académie de la Grande Chaumière, began work on a Babar book of his own. Although his style of painting was different from his father's and he emphasized picture more than text in the creation of his books, Laurent trained himself to draw elephants in strict accord with the style of his father. Consequently, many people did not notice any difference in authorship and assumed the six-year gap in the series was because of the war. Laurent has always been careful to emphasize that Babar was his father's creation (and to some extent his mother's) and that he continued the series largely as a way of keeping the memory of his father and his own childhood alive.

== Death ==
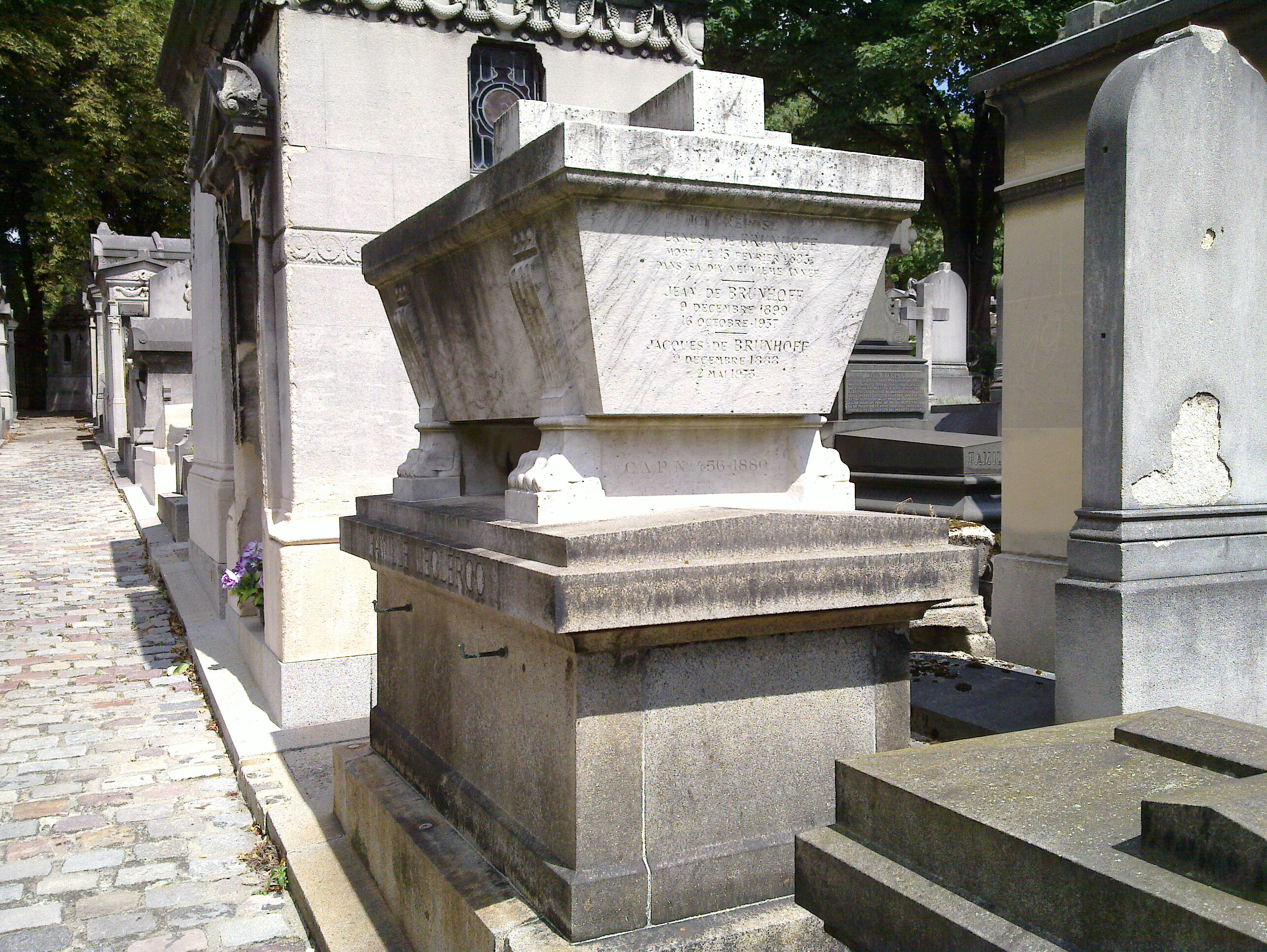
Jean de Brunhoff's grave

Jean de Brunhoff died from tuberculosis on 16 October 1937; he was 37 years old.

== Bibliography ==
- The Story of Babar. New York: Harrison Smith and Robert Haas, 1933
- The Travels of Babar. New York: Harrison Smith and Robert Haas, 1934
- Babar the King. New York: Harrison Smith and Robert Haas, 1935
- A.B.C. of Babar. New York: Random House, 1936 (out of print)
- Zephir's Holidays (also published as Babar and Zephir and Babar's Friend Zephir). New York: Random House, 1937
- Babar and His Children. New York: Random House, 1938
- Babar and Father Christmas. New York: Random House, 1940 (final book)
