= List of The Raccoons episodes =

The following is a list of episodes of the Canadian animated television series The Raccoons. The series began as TV specials broadcast between 1980 and 1983 and a direct-to-video special in 1984, before becoming a regular series in 1985.

The Raccoons logo

== Series overview ==
Series	Episodes	Originally released	
Series	Episodes	First released	Last released
Specials	4	17 December 1980	13 September 1984
1	11	4 July 1985	27 December 1986
2	10	2 November 1987	13 November 1987
3	13	7 November 1988	23 November 1988
4	13	6 November 1989	23 November 1989
5	13	12 November 1990	19 March 1991

== Specials (1980–84) ==
The Raccoons began as three television specials and one direct-to-video special:

No.	Title	Directed by	Written by	Original release date
S1	"The Christmas Raccoons"	Kevin Gillis & Paul Schibli	Story by : Gary Dunford; Teleplay by : Kevin Gillis & Juliet Law Packer	17 December 1980 (Canada); 20 December 1980 (USA)
Cyril Sneer is cutting down all of the trees in the Evergreen Forest, and it is up to married couple Ralph and Melissa Raccoon, their friend Bert and their new sheepdog friend Schaeffer to save the forest. Note: First appearances of the Raccoons (Bert, Ralph and Melissa), Ranger Dan, his kids (Julie and Tommy), Cyril and Cedric Sneer and sheepdog Schaeffer. Songs: "Lost Angels", "Perfect Tree", "Lake Freeze" & "Shake the Sun"
S2	"The Raccoons on Ice"	Kevin Gillis	Kevin Gillis & Juliet Law Packer	20 December 1981 (Canada); 21 November 1982 (USA)
The fate of Evergreen Lake is at stake as Cyril Sneer plans to build his "Cyril-Dome" on top of the lake. The Raccoons, Schaeffer, Cedric Sneer, and Sophia Tutu challenge Cyril to a hockey game to see who keeps the lake once and for all. Note: First appearances of Sophia Tutu (Cedric's girlfriend), Cyril's dog Snag and the Bears. Songs: "Takin' My Time", "To Have You", "Some Days" & "You Can Do It".
S3	"The Raccoons and the Lost Star"	Kevin Gillis	Kevin Gillis & Juliet Law Packer	13 December 1983 (Canada); 5 November 1983 (USA)
Schaeffer is suddenly whisked away to an alien planet, where Cyril Sneer plans to rule the Earth. Note: First appearances of Broo the Puppy and the Pigs. Songs: "Calling You", "One More Night", "Lions and Tigers", "Fallin' Fallin'", "Shining" & "Friends"
S4	"The Raccoons: Let's Dance!"	Kevin Gillis	Kevin Gillis	13 September 1984 (Canada); 5 October 1984 (USA)
A direct-to-video "music video" consisting largely of clips from the previous specials set to songs (also from the previous specials), as Bert Raccoon is having a music video party and everyone is invited, although Cyril is trying to get some sleep in the process. Note: This is the pilot for the then-upcoming TV series. Songs: "Calling You" [not present in 2023 remaster], "You Can Do It", "Takin' My Time", "To Have You", "Lions and Tigers", "Friends", "Shining" [the latter two feature Hank Martin instead of John Schneider in the 2023 remaster] & "Missing It" [2023 remaster]

== Regular series ==
Sixty episodes were broadcast between 1985 and 1991. All but three episode titles had exclamation marks at the end.

=== Season 1 (1985–86) ===
No. overall	No. in season	Title	Directed by	Written by	Original release date
1	1	"Surprise Attack"	Kevin Gillis	Kevin Gillis, Derek Diorio & Rick Jones	11 November 1985 (Canada); 4 July 1985 (USA)
Bert, Ralph, Melissa, and the rest of the gang plan a surprise for Cyril Sneer, which makes him paranoid when he thinks that the Raccoons are planning an uprising against him. Note: From this episode on, the instrumental to "Sooner or Later" was played. Song: "Run with Us", "Sooner or Later" (uncredited) & "Happy Birthday to You".
2	2	"Going It Alone!"	Kevin Gillis	Kevin Gillis, Derek Diorio & Dan Lalande	12 November 1985 (Canada); 4 August 1985 (USA)
Bert Raccoon climbs Evergreen Mountain to prove to Melissa and Ralph that he can do something on his own. Meanwhile, Cyril Sneer plans to stop Bert from keeping a dark family secret hidden. Song: "Night After Night" & "Sooner or Later" (instrumental).
3	3	"A Night to Remember"	Kevin Gillis	Kevin Gillis & Jamie Wayne	13 November 1985 (Canada); 1 September 1985 (USA)
Bert and Ralph take Cedric on a camping trip to a fort they built as kids, without the girls, and Cedric must spend the night inside the local haunted house to join their club. Song: "All Life Long"
4	4	"The Evergreen Grand Prix"	Kevin Gillis	Kevin Gillis, Derek Diorio, Dan Lalande, Alan Gordon & Tobi Gordon	14 November 1985 (Canada); 5 October 1985 (USA)
Cyril Sneer and Mammoth Motors plan to create a car factory in the Evergreen Forest, possibly ruining the beauty of the forest forever. In order to save it, Bert and his friends create a solar-powered car to race against Cyril's own Sneermobile. Note: First appearance of Mr. Mammoth and his bird sidekick. Song: "Here I Go Again" & "Run With Us" (instrumental).
5	5	"The Runaways!"	Kevin Gillis	Kevin Gillis, Chas Lawther; Gail Kerbel, Derek Diorio, & Dan Lalande	15 November 1985 (Canada); 2 November 1985 (USA)
Because he feels that his father does not appreciate him, Cedric Sneer runs away from home and lives with his friends, the Raccoons. Meanwhile, the human children Julie and Tommy run away from home as well, but get lost in the forest. Song: "Sooner or Later"
6	6	"Buried Treasure!"	Kevin Gillis	Kevin Gillis, Derek Diorio, Jamie Wayne & Dan Lalande	18 November 1985 (Canada); 1 December 1985 (USA)
Bert, Cedric, and little puppy Broo find an old treasure map and search all around the Evergreen Forest to find it. Meanwhile, Cyril Sneer hears about the trio's search and wants the treasure for himself. Song: "Missing It"
7	7	"The Intruders!"	Kevin Gillis	Kevin Gillis, Carol Bolt & B.P. Nichol	19 November 1985 (Canada); 4 February 1986 (USA)
When Ralph and Cedric become trapped in Cyril Sneer's new vault, it is up to Bert, Melissa, Broo, and even Cyril to save them, while dodging the vault's many traps. Song: "Hang On, Hold On"
8	8	"Opportunity Knocks!"	Kevin Gillis	Kevin Gillis, Derek Diorio & Dan Lalande	6 January 1986 (Canada); 17 August 1986 (USA)
Ralph Raccoon gets a job opportunity working at a major newspaper company in the city, while Ranger Forest Dan gets a job opportunity in the city, as well. It is up to Bert Raccoon to make sure that the gang stays in the Evergreen Forest to stop Cyril Sneer from ruining the Evergreen Forest. Song: "Ain't No Planes", "Sooner or Later" (instrumental) & "Here I Go Again" (instrumental).
9	9	"Cry Wolf!"	Kevin Gillis	Kevin Gillis, Carol Bolt & B.P. Nichol	7 January 1986 (Canada); 13 October 1986 (USA)
After worrying Ralph and Melissa with his wild stories, nobody believes to Bert when he finds out that Cyril Sneer, who is suffering from insomnia, is planning to pave the Evergreen Forest into a giant parking lot to get to sleep. Note: This episode features the final appearances of Ranger Dan, Julie and Tommy. Their cabin would make a brief appearance in "Blast from the Past!". Despite the humans' departure, Schaeffer and Broo continue their tenure in the show. Song: "Here I Go Again" & "Sooner or Later" (instrumental).
10	10	"Rumours!"	Kevin Gillis	Story by : Chas Lawther & Gail Kerbel; Teleplay by : Kevin Gillis, Derek Diorio & Dan Lalande	8 January 1986 (Canada); 25 November 1986 (USA)
Cedric and Sophia overhear that the king and queen are arriving at the Evergreen Forest, which intrigues Bert to become a knight. Meanwhile, Cyril wants to become a knight as well, but only to be knighted as ruler of the Evergreen Forest. Note: The instrumental version of "Got Me Singing" was played. The vocal version was not heard until "Courting Disaster!". Goof: Cedric tells Sophia that Excalibur Sneer was Cyril's great-great-great uncle. Cyril, a few minutes later, states that Excalibur was Cedric's great-great-uncle. Song: "Missing It", "Sooner or Later" (instrumental) & "Got Me Singing" (instrumental).
11	11	"Gold Rush!"	Kevin Gillis	Kevin Gillis, Derek Diorio & Dan Lalande	9 January 1986 (Canada); 27 December 1986 (USA)
Cyril plans to buy the Evergreen Standard, and even gets local entrepreneur Mr. Knox to help him. Mr. Knox agrees to buy every ink-and-paper company so that the Standard will run out of supplies, but wants his payment in gold. Meanwhile, Bert plans to save the paper by magically creating enough gold to get supplies. Note: First appearance of Mr. Knox. Last appearance of the original "Run With Us" theme sung by Steve Lunt, the final episode featuring Linda Feige as the voice of Melissa, and to be animated at Atkinson Film-Arts. Song: "Don't Fear the Fire" & "Sooner or Later" (instrumental).

=== Season 2 (1987) ===
No. overall	No. in season	Title	Directed by	Written by	Original release date
12	1	"Double Play!"	Kevin Gillis & Paul Schibli	Kevin Gillis, Derek Diorio & Dan Lalande	2 November 1987
A big-time baseball team known as The Mammoth Mudhens are arriving in the Evergreen Forest, and is looking for someone to join their game. This causes the friendship between Bert Raccoon and Cedric Sneer to shatter as the two compete against each other to get the contract. Note: This is the first episode featuring Susan Roman as Melissa, Lisa Lougheed as the main female singer instead of Luba, and to be animated by Hinton Animation Studios. Song: "Growing Up" & "Sooner or Later" (instrumental).
13	2	"The Sweet Smell of Success!"	Kevin Gillis & Paul Schibli	Story by : Chas Lawther & Gail Kerbel; Teleplay by : Kevin Gillis, Derek Diorio & Dan Lalande	3 November 1987
Cyril Sneer tempts Bert to become his new spokesperson for his new line of cologne. Note: From this episode on, the instrumental to "The Sweet Smell of Success" was played. Song: "Hang On, Hold On", "The Sweet Smell of Success" & "Got Me Singing" (instrumental).
14	3	"Blast from the Past!"	Kevin Gillis & Paul Schibli	Dan Lalande, Derek Diorio & Rick Jones	4 November 1987
Cyril is sent into a panic when he learns that his old business partner Karl Snarl, whom he double-crossed years ago, is about to return and "give him what he deserves". Meanwhile, Bert finds an old helicopter, and Melissa must overcome her fear of heights to save her friends. Song: "This Time"
15	4	"Power Trip!"	Kevin Gillis & Paul Schibli	Gerald Tripp, Derek Diorio & Kevin Gillis	5 November 1987
Due to an unpaid bill, Mammoth cuts Cyril's energy supply, and Cyril plans to build a power dam to put Mammoth in its place. Meanwhile, Ralph's Aunt Gertie comes to visit, and Bert and Cedric agree to stay with her while Ralph and Melissa are on a camping trip. Song: "Hold Back Tomorrow" & "Got Me Singing" (instrumental).
16	5	"Stop the Clock!"	Kevin Gillis & Paul Schibli	Dan Lalande, Derek Diorio & Kevin Gillis	6 November 1987
Cousin Bentley comes to visit the Raccoons. Meanwhile, Cyril Sneer tries to regain his youthfulness with a magic potion. Note: First appearance of Bentley Raccoon. Goof: Bentley was first introduced in this episode as Ralph or Melissa's cousin, but is later referenced as their nephew. Song: "Growing Up", "Sooner or Later" (instrumental) & "The Sweet Smell of Success" (instrumental).
17	6	"The Artful Dodger!"	Kevin Gillis & Paul Schibli	Alan Templeton, Mary Crawford, Kevin Gillis & Gerald Tripp	9 November 1987
Bert and Melissa explore the mysterious Endless Echo caverns and happen upon some unusual cave paintings. After bidding $50,000 on a small painting, Cyril Sneer learns of the profitability of the art market. Note: First appearance of Lady Baden-Baden and Professor Smedley-Smythe. Song: Here I Go Again" & "The Sweet Smell of Success" (instrumental).
18	7	"Last Legs!"	Kevin Gillis & Paul Schibli	Derek Diorio, Dan Lalande & Kevin Gillis	10 November 1987
Cyril Sneer has a bad cold, and due to a misunderstanding, the pigs convince him he is dying. Ber, upon hearing the news, puts all of his printing press savings into a monument for Cyril, and even holds some odd jobs to gain more funding. When Cyril finds out he is not dying at all, he tries to take advantage of the opportunity to bankrupt the Evergreen Standard. Note: This is the only episode to not feature Cedric Sneer, but he is mentioned. Song: "Stop the Clock" & "The Sweet Smell of Success" (instrumental).
19	8	"Read No Evil!"	Kevin Gillis & Paul Schibli	Story by : Alan Templeton, & Mary Crawford; Teleplay by : Alan Templeton, Mary Crawford, Gerald Tripp & Kevin Gillis	11 November 1987
Bert and Cedric meet Herman the hermit, and learn that his home, Beaver Bite Swamp, may have oil under it. This grabs Cyril's attention, and he tries to buy the swamp out from underneath Herman. Note: First time the credits are spoken over. Pig One (Lloyd) asks Cyril to read the fine print he received from Mammoth. Song: "New World"
20	9	"Courting Disaster!"	Kevin Gillis & Paul Schibli	Story by : Alan Templeton, & Mary Crawford; Teleplay by : Alan Templeton; Mary Crawford, Gerald Tripp & Kevin Gillis	12 November 1987
Due to a misunderstanding, Cyril Sneer and the resident Lady Baden-Baden are getting married. This worries Cedric, who never knew his true mother, and Mr. Knox, who secretly loves Lady Baden-Baden. Song: "Got Me Singing" & "The Sweet Smell of Success" (instrumental).
21	10	"Time Trap!"	Kevin Gillis & Paul Schibli	Mary Crawford & Alan Templeton	13 November 1987
The Pigs create a time machine, which Cyril Sneer uses to go back to certain times and change certain events. Song: "Stop the Clock"

=== Season 3 (1988) ===
No. overall	No. in season	Title	Directed by	Written by	Original release date
22	1	"The Prism of Zenda!"	Kevin Gillis & Paul Schibli	Mary Crawford & Alan Templeton	7 November 1988
Lady Baden-Baden allows Cyril Sneer to use her priceless diamond, The Prism of Zenda, to be used in a big-budget movie funded by Cyril himself. When the prism disappears, it is up to Bert to find it, while Cyril distracts Mr. Knox and Lady Baden-Baden from finding out that the prism disappeared. Note: The title is a reference to The Prisoner of Zenda novel. Song: "Missing It"
23	2	"Paperback Hero!"	Kevin Gillis & Paul Schibli	Mary Crawford, Alan Templeton, Kevin Gillis & Paul Schibli	8 November 1988
Famous author and adventurer Sir Malcolm Havelock comes to the Evergreen Forest, and Bert is determined to come along on his next expedition. Meanwhile, Cyril Sneer plans to fund the expedition, with treasure on his mind. Song: "Here I Go Again"
24	3	"The Chips Are Down!"	Kevin Gillis & Paul Schibli	Story by : Dan Lalande, Derek Diorio & Sebastian Grunstra; Teleplay by : Mary Crawford & Alan Templeton	9 November 1988
Before Cyril Sneer can sell his feeble potato chip plant to Mr. Knox, he desperately needs to increase his sales figures. He and the pigs hold a phoney contest for a new bike. Bert gets sucked into the contest and wastes all his money on it. Note: This episode has an anti-drugs message. Song: "Restless in the Night" & "The Sweet Smell of Success" (instrumental).
25	4	"Life in the Fast Lane!"	Kevin Gillis & Paul Schibli	Gerry Capelle, Kevin Gillis & Paul Schibli	10 November 1988
When local dirt bike champ Bix Wheelie comes to town, Bert is fascinated by his antics, while Cedric usually takes the blame for Bix's actions. Song: "Run With Us", "Hold Back Tomorrow" & "Restless in the Night" (instrumental).
26	5	"Monster Mania!"	Kevin Gillis & Paul Schibli	Mary Crawford & Alan Templeton	11 November 1988
When Melissa and Bert spot a fire-breathing monster in Evergreen Lake, tourists begin flocking to see it. Cyril Sneer takes advantage of the opportunity and tries to sell overpriced monster merchandise. Song: "Growing Up"
27	6	"Mom's the Word!"	Kevin Gillis & Paul Schibli	Mary Crawford & Alan Templeton	14 November 1988
Mrs. Pig, the pigs' mother, comes to visit her sons, believing the pigs are millionaires due to their misleading letters, and so she asks them for some cash to help rebuild the old family home after its destruction by a hurricane. Song: "Restless in the Night"
28	7	"Picture Perfect!"	Kevin Gillis & Paul Schibli	Mary Crawford & Alan Templeton	15 November 1988
When Melissa manages to get some photos of Snag saving Cedric from a fire, she is offered a job for a major magazine. Word of Snag's heroics also reaches a TV producer, and he gets a chance to become the star of a television show. Note: Second and last time the credits are spoken over. Cyril turns Mr. Barnes down and decides he likes having Snag around. Song: "Here I Go Again" & "The Sweet Smell of Success" (instrumental).
29	8	"Strictly by the Book!"	Kevin Gillis & Paul Schibli	Derek Diorio & Dan Lalande	16 November 1988
After Cedric is derided by his friends for not being assertive or confident enough, Cyril ships him off to a university, and he comes back a changed aardvark. Eventually, nobody can stand the 'new and improved' Cedric. It is up to Cyril and the Raccoons to change Cedric back to his old self. Note: Last appearance of Sophia Tutu as a recurring character. She returns for a brief cameo in "The Evergreen Express!", "A Catered Affair!" and "The Headline Hunter!". Song: "Stop The Clock"
30	9	"The Evergreen Express!"	Kevin Gillis & Paul Schibli	Mary Crawford & Alan Templeton	17 November 1988
Bert discovers a long-lost steam engine with a coal tender and a caboose hidden deep in the Evergreen Forest. Meanwhile, Cyril discovers that inside the train is a stash of ten million dollars from a hundred years ago. Goof: Cedric discovers that the engine is the Evergreen No. 504 on the Evergreen Express being an old 4-4-0 engine or an American type steam locomotive after removing the rust from the number plate, but the cab number is already visually seen on the smoke box door and on the tender when they first found the engine. Locomotives of the most common 4-4-0 wheel arrangement were used on American railroads, during the 1800s and 1830s up until 1928, and were given the name American in 1872 to show how they did all the work of every railroad in America. These types of engines have eight four wheels (four leading wheels, four driving wheels, and no trailing trails), and since some engines have tenders with four wheeled trucks to make up for eight wheels, the Evergreen 504 engine has four wheels on its tender. Song: "Run With Us", "Sooner or Later" (instrumental) & "The Sweet Smell of Success" (instrumental).
31	10	"Trouble Shooter!"	Kevin Gillis & Paul Schibli	Mary Crawford & Alan Templeton	18 November 1988 (Canada); 17 April 1988 (USA)
Bentley Raccoon is going through a personal crisis and runs away from home to live in Bert and Cedric's fort. Meanwhile, the Sneer Mansion's new computerised security system goes haywire and attempts to trap Cyril and the pigs inside the mansion while it floods with water. Note: This is the first episode to feature George and Nicole Raccoon, parents of Bentley and Lisa. Song: "Come On Home"
32	11	"The Paper Chase!"	Kevin Gillis & Paul Schibli	Mary Crawford & Alan Templeton	21 November 1988
When Ralph gets nominated by the civic election committee for his work on the standard, he turns into an egotistical jerk in an attempt to improve every aspect of the paper. Meanwhile, Cyril Sneer is nominated for the big buck award, but his winning is jeopardised when the bears go on strike. Song: "When the Sun Comes Up"
33	12	"Simon Says!"	Kevin Gillis & Paul Schibli	Derek Diorio & Dan Lalande	22 November 1988
Simon Sneer, Cyril's supposed older brother, shows up at Sneer Mansion expecting an inheritance. Bert Raccoon, however, sees him as an imposter named Sid Leech and will do anything to prove himself. Song: "Growing Up"
34	13	"Games People Play!"	Kevin Gillis & Paul Schibli	Mary Crawford & Alan Templeton	23 November 1988
Cyril Sneer goes on a game show and must recall voices of acquaintances from past episodes to win the prize. Things take a turn for the worse when the tax collector is mixed into the situation. Song: "Hold Back Tomorrow"

=== Season 4 (1989) ===
No. overall	No. in season	Title	Directed by	Written by	Original release date
35	1	"Second Chance!"	Kevin Gillis & Sebastian Grunstra	Mary Crawford & Alan Templeton	6 November 1989
Cyril Sneer's childhood friend, Woodchuck Berry, shows up in the Evergreen forest. When Woodchuck is hired to play at Schaeffer's cafe, Cyril is given another chance to play with his friend onstage. Note: The first of two episodes not to have a traditional music interlude with a song. Woodchuck Berry is based on music legend Chuck Berry. Song: "Woodchuck Breakdown" (instrumental)
36	2	"The Sky's the Limit!"	Kevin Gillis & Sebastian Grunstra	Mary Crawford & Alan Templeton	7 November 1989 (Canada); 26 July 1989 (USA)
When Troy Malone comes to visit Melissa, Ralph tries to win back Melissa's affection by entering a flight contest. Song: "All Life Long" & "The Sweet Smell of Success" (instrumental).
37	3	"Bully for You!"	Kevin Gillis & Sebastian Grunstra	Mary Crawford & Alan Templeton	8 November 1989
To get a contract signed, Cyril Sneer agrees to look after Mr. Knox's nephew. This results in Cedric becoming the nephew's new target for bullying. Song: "Stop The Clock"
38	4	"A Catered Affair!"	Kevin Gillis & Sebastian Grunstra	Mary Crawford & Alan Templeton	9 November 1989
Lady Baden-Baden decides to work at the Blue Spruce Cafe, much to Mr. Knox's dismay. Song: "Here I Go Again"
39	5	"Search and Rescue!"	Kevin Gillis & Sebastian Grunstra	Mary Crawford & Alan Templeton	10 November 1989
Bert and Cedric go exploring on an island to find a fallen meteorite, but they don't tell anyone where they ate going, and get stranded. Soon, everyone else is desperately scouring the forest and consulting Lady Baden-Baden's astrology to find them. Song: "Come On Home" & "Bananazz".
40	6	"Spring Fever!"	Kevin Gillis & Sebastian Grunstra	Mary Crawford & Alan Templeton	13 November 1989
Bert falls in love with Lisa, Bentley's older sister, when she comes to visit the Evergreen Forest. After much procrastination, he gets a date with her with unrealistic expectations for someone he has just met. Meanwhile, Cyril Sneer must choose to attend a camp reunion with Cedric or meet up with a famous billionaire. Note: First appearance of Lisa Raccoon. Song: "Teach Me" & "Sooner or Later" (instrumental).
41	7	"The Family Secret!"	Kevin Gillis & Sebastian Grunstra	Darson Hall	14 November 1989
When searching the family archives for one of Lady Baden-Baden's literary projects, Bert and Cedric find papers for the adoption of a Sneer and believe Cedric has been adopted. Song: "New World"
42	8	"The Great Escape!"	Kevin Gillis & Sebastian Grunstra	Mary Crawford & Alan Templeton	15 November 1989
When a famous magician shows up in the Evergreen forest, Bert is bent on becoming his apprentice. Meanwhile, Cyril Sneer tries to sell Knox his new $750,000 secure vault. Song: "Can't Trust Myself"
43	9	"Making the Grade!"	Kevin Gillis & Sebastian Grunstra	Darson Hall	16 November 1989
When Bentley comes for his annual visit to the forest, Bert and Cedric take him to see the old Evergreen Schoolhouse. There, they meet their old teacher, Ms. Primrose, and learn that the school is too small for government regulation and must be closed. Song: "Teach Me", "Sooner or Later" (instrumental) & "The Sweet Smell of Success" (instrumental).
44	10	"Science Friction!"	Kevin Gillis & Sebastian Grunstra	Mary Crawford & Alan Templeton	17 November 1989
Cyril goes out of control trying to be a good father for Cedric, when he builds an amateur flying machine to enter the science fair. Meanwhile, Bert discovers a tar pit containing dinosaur bones. Song: "Growing Up" & "The Sweet Smell of Success" (instrumental).
45	11	"Stealing the Show!"	Kevin Gillis & Sebastian Grunstra	Darson Hall	20 November 1989
Lloyd (Pig Three) takes up shoplifting to impress his brothers' thing for comic books. Meanwhile, Cyril Sneer and Mr. Knox compete with products in a contest in an attempt to conquer the skateboard industry. Song: "Can't Trust Myself" & "Sooner or Later" (instrumental).
46	12	"The Phantom of Sneer Mansion!"	Kevin Gillis & Sebastian Grunstra	Jim Betts	21 November 1989
As Cyril tries to put up a play in the old theatre, it is being haunted by a supposed ghost. Bruno Gerussi makes a guest appearance. Song: "Never Even Know What Time It Is"
47	13	"The Headline Hunter!"	Kevin Gillis & Sebastian Grunstra	Mary Crawford & Alan Templeton	23 November 1989
The pigs get sick of Cyril's treatment, and hire ace TV reporter Barbara LaFrum to ruin his reputation. Meanwhile, Bert and the gang recall past episodes as they prepare for the big Bachelor auction. Note: Sophia Tutu makes a short return in this episode (albeit in a silent cameo). Barbara LaFrum was voiced by Barbara Frum. Song: "Never Give Up", "Restless in the Night" (instrumental), "The Sweet Smell of Success" (instrumental) & "Bananazz" (instrumental).

=== Season 5 (1990–91) ===
No. overall	No. in season	Title	Directed by	Written by	Original release date
48	1	"Cold Feet!"	Kevin Gillis & Sebastian Grunstra	Mary Crawford & Alan Templeton	12 November 1990
Cyril Sneer attempts a relationship with a movie star whom he meets in a car accident, only to find that she has an extreme dislike for his recent business client. Meanwhile, Bert and Cedric must deal with the traumatising experience of skydiving. Song: "Never Even Know What Time It Is"
49	2	"Stress Test!"	Kevin Gillis & Sebastian Grunstra	Darson Hall	13 November 1990
When Cyril Sneer is taken to the hospital after getting an ulcer, it is up to the pigs to keep track of his big land deal. Meanwhile, Bert gets ripped off by Milton Midas when he sells him a faulty toy plane, and attempts to retrieve a refund. Song: "Run with Us" & "The Sweet Smell of Success" (instrumental).
50	3	"Moving In!"	Kevin Gillis & Sebastian Grunstra	Alan Templeton & Mary Crawford	14 November 1990 (Canada); 12 March 1990 (USA)
Ralph's older brother, George, ventures into the Evergreen Forest, along with his wife Nicole, Lisa and Bentley. Lisa has trouble getting adjusted to living in the forest, away from all her friends. Meanwhile, the pigs are laid off and get a job working at Mr. Knox's TV station. Note: This is Nick Nichols' final episode as the voice of Pig One. Song: "All Life Long"
51	4	"End of the Line!"	Kevin Gillis & Sebastian Grunstra	Darson Hall	15 November 1990
Needing a new product to sell to Mammoth at an upcoming business conference, Cyril puts Cedric in charge of the project. In doing so, Cedrirc realises that 'Sneer Snake oil', one of Cyril's existing products, can be used as Sunblock. Meanwhile, a train-load of garbage mysteriously arrives in the forest, prompting Ralph and Melissa to research its origin. Note: First episode to feature Keith Hampshire as Pig One. Song: "Growing Up"
52	5	"Easy Money!"	Kevin Gillis & Sebastian Grunstra	Alan Templeton & Mary Crawford	16 November 1990
When Bentley destroys Bert's new RC car, he turns to an advertising scam to repay the debt, resulting in him and the pigs getting trapped in the endless echo caverns. Bert, Lisa and Cedric must brave the tunnels of Evergreen Lake to set them free. Song: "Restless in the Night", "Sooner or Later" (instrumental) & "The Sweet Smell of Success" (instrumental).
53	6	"Endless Summer!"	Kevin Gillis & Sebastian Grunstra	Alan Templeton & Mary Crawford	19 November 1990
When the pigs talk Bentley into taking a job at Cyril's new robotics company, he becomes good at a job, and Cyril promotes him right off the bat. The pigs take offence at this, as they figure they deserve the raise for "Bringing Bentley into the organisation". Thus, they screw up the computer system, resulting in Bentley's dismissal. When Cyril sees the light, he must confront Bentley, who is now on a camping trip with Bert and Cedric. Note: This is the second episode of the series not to feature a song, but an instrumental piece instead. Song: "Endless Summer" (instrumental), "Sooner or Later" (instrumental) & "Restless in the Night" (instrumental).
54	7	"Promises Promises!"	Kevin Gillis & Sebastian Grunstra	Alan Templeton & Mary Crawford	20 November 1990
Bert bites off more than he can chew trying to please everyone in preparation for the fair. Meanwhile, the pigs' mother visits again, just in time to witness their little jam-making scheme. Note: This is the only episode not to include a musical interlude. Final episode to feature Noam Zylberman as Bentley.
55	8	"Black Belt Bentley!"	Kevin Gillis & Sebastian Grunstra	Darson Hall	21 November 1990
After getting picked on by some of his schoolmates, Bentley desires to learn self-defence. To his advantage, Schaeffer reveals he is a black belt in karate, and opts to teach him, Bert, and Cedric. When Schaeffer realises Bentley's prospects with martial arts, he refuses to teach Bentley due to a troubled past. Meanwhile, Cyril Sneer destroys one of his own companies in an attempt to conquer the soft drink industry. Note: First episode to feature Stuart Stone as Bentley, who had earlier voiced Danny from "Stress Test!" Also, this is the only episode animated at Bardel Entertainment in addition to being animated at Hinton. Song: "Growing Up" & "Restless in the Night" (instrumental).
56	9	"The Wrong Stuff!"	Kevin Gillis & Sebastian Grunstra	Alan Templeton & Mary Crawford	22 November 1990
As Cyril is about to launch his own satellite TV service, the notion excites Ralph and Schaeffer about the coverage of over forty sports channels, while the pigs attempt to transmit a message to their mother for Mother's Day. Elsewhere, to prove he is capable of handling his own dog, Bert allows Bentley to watch over Broo for the weekend, but Broo ends up getting trapped inside Cyril's satellite, thus leading to a time-sensitive chase to save him. Song: "When the Sun Comes Up"
57	10	"Join the Club!"	Kevin Gillis & Sebastian Grunstra	Darson Hall	23 November 1990
Bowing to peer pressure, Lisa starts smoking. Meanwhile, Cyril Sneer tries to join an exclusive golf club. In the end, the two discuss the merits of individuality. Note: The only episode to include a "Viewer Discretion is Advised" notice in the U.S. due to its depiction of smoking, but retained the series 'C' rating in Canada. Song: "Can't Trust Myself"
58	11	"The Evergreen Election!"	Kevin Gillis & Sebastian Grunstra	Mary Crawford & Alan Templeton	26 November 1990
Bert decides to run against Cyril Sneer for mayor of the Evergreen Forest. Scenes from previous episodes are used to show their political views. Song: "Here I Go Again" & "The Sweet Smell of Success" (instrumental).
59	12	"The One That Got Away!"	Kevin Gillis & Sebastian Grunstra	Mary Crawford & Alan Templeton	27 November 1990
The pigs need cash, something they simply cannot get from the boss. The answer: moonlight for Milton Midas, dump some odd drums in the gorge, and all their troubles are gone. That is, if the drums were not to land in a river that empties into the forest's waterhole, but this is no ordinary waterhole. It is part of Cyril's new ad campaign, Bert and Cedric's fishing hole, as well as home to the largest catfish in the forest. Note: This is the only episode with an unhappy ending, with the characters sadly acknowledging that the waterhole will remain contaminated for some generations to come. The song "Ain't No Planes" also plays at the end of the episode, rather than in the middle of it. The only time a song interlude is played at the end instead. Song: "Ain't No Planes"
60	13	"Go for Gold!"	Kevin Gillis & Sebastian Grunstra	Darson Hall	19 March 1991 (Canada); 28 August 1992 (USA)
In the extended series finale, Cyril Sneer retires, and Cedric takes over the family business. Robin Steel, a sleazy con artist, soon convinces him to organise a bogus race. Bert and Lisa soon join in the race to help out Cedric. Song: "Hold Back Tomorrow" & "Sooner or Later" (instrumental).
