= Yes You Can (TV program) =

Television series

- Presented by: Kevin Gillis; Trevor Bruneau; Tammy Bourne
- Country of origin: Canada
- No. of seasons: 3
- No. of episodes: 36

Production
- Running time: 30 minutes

Original release
- Network: CBC Television
- Release: September 19, 1980 – March 29, 1983

Yes You Can is a Canadian children's television series broadcast on CBC Television from 1980 to 1983, and aired 36 episodes. Hosted by singer Kevin Gillis, and co-hosted by Trevor Bruneau and Tammy Bourne, the half-hour live-action series was sports-themed and encouraged fitness and good health. Also featured were the comedic Coach Cuddles Ford (played by Patrick Ford), and two animated characters, "Harry Hog" and "Body Man", voiced by Michael Magee.

Each show also featured an appearance from a professional athlete, such as Gordie Howe, Karen Kain and Toller Cranston.

The show was written by Jack Hutchinson and Jamie Wayne, produced by Bill Hunt, directed by Ron Piggott and executive produced by Michael Lansbury.

Reruns of Yes You Can aired in the launch schedules of TSN and YTV.

Kevin Gillis went on to create and produce The Christmas Raccoons animated special – which led to The Raccoons on Ice, The Raccoons and the Lost Star, The Raccoons: Let's Dance! and The Raccoons animated series. Many of the songs Gillis used the Yes You Can series were later re-recorded and used in the Raccoons animated series.
