= Tukiki and His Search for a Merry Christmas =

1979 Christmas TV special

- Written by: Christine Atkinson
- Directed by: Vic Atkinson
- Voices of: Adam Rich; Sterling Holloway
- Music by: Hagood Hardy
- Country of origin: Canada
- Original language: English

Production
- Producers: Beryl Friesen; W.H. Stevens Jr.
- Cinematography: Ron Haines; Colette Brière
- Editor: Gerald Tripp
- Running time: 30 minutes
- Production companies: Atkinson Film-Arts; Titlecraft; Pooled Film Services

Original release
- Network: CBC
- Release: December 24, 1979

Tukiki and His Search for a Merry Christmas is a 1979 animated Christmas television special produced by the Canadian-based Atkinson Film-Arts. It was originally broadcast on CBC and in syndication on December 24, 1979.

== Plot ==
Tukiki (voiced by Adam Rich) is a small Eskimo boy who sets out to discover the meaning of Christmas along with a magical character known as North Wind (voiced by Sterling Holloway). While on his journey, Tukiki visits different lands with varying cultures and customs. At each of these places, he learns something different about Christmas and is given gifts which he eventually takes back to give to his selfish arctic friends. The thoughtful giving of gifts brings about a change in Tukiki's homeland and suddenly harmony reigns where once was none, and through Tukiki's act of love, the true meaning of Christmas is discovered.

== Cast ==
The voice cast included:

=== Principal characters ===
- Adam Rich – Tukiki
- Sterling Holloway – North Wind

=== Other voices ===
- Sharon Burke
- Bob Dermer
- Fred Little
- Bill Luxton
- Bernard McManus
- Richard Perigrine
- Noreen Young

== Award nominations ==
1980 Genie Awards:

- Outstanding Independent Film - W.H. Stevens Jr., Beryl Friesen
- Outstanding Animation - W.H. Stevens Jr., Beryl Friesen
- Outstanding Musical Score (Non-Feature) - Hagood Hardy

== Home media ==
Tukiki and His Search for a Merry Christmas was released on VHS by Embassy Home Entertainment in 1986 which has long been out of print. The special was released as a manufacture-on-demand DVD-R in August 2008 as part of the "Holiday Classics" series by Phoenix Learning Group, Inc.

== See also ==
- List of Christmas films
