= Atkinson Film-Arts =

Former Canadian animation studio

- Industry: Animation
- Founded: 1974
- Founder: Vic Atkinson; Jonathan Finkelstein
- Defunct: 1989
- Fate: Bankruptcy and liquidation
- Headquarters: Ottawa, Ontario, Canada
- Products: Television specials Television series Direct-to-video films Feature films

Atkinson Film-Arts was an animation studio based in Ottawa, Ontario, Canada. The company is best known for producing the first two Care Bears television specials – The Care Bears in the Land Without Feelings and The Care Bears Battle the Freeze Machine – and the four syndicated specials that inspired The Raccoons (as well as first-season episodes of the show itself). Atkinson also produced the Christmas specials The Little Brown Burro, Tukiki and His Search for a Merry Christmas and The Trolls and the Christmas Express and the 1986–87 series The Adventures of Teddy Ruxpin (with DIC Entertainment).

They also worked on the 1981 science fiction anthology film Heavy Metal and The Body Electric, an animated film featuring music composed by the Canadian rock band Rush.

== History ==
Vic Atkinson founded the company.

Atkinson was hospitalized after overseeing the production of two segments for Heavy Metal. He recovered and oversaw The Christmas Raccoons before leaving the company and selling his share to Bill Stevens. Atkinson did not like the direction the company was heading in and stated that "I won't produce garbage" while Stevens says he left over disagreements regarding growth and financial risk. The Christmas Raccoons cost $700,000, The Raccoons on Ice cost $850,000 and the episodes of The Raccoons cost up to $415,000.

F. R. Crawley, who was $1.2 million in debt, sold his company to Stevens for $1.

Merilyn Read acquired the rights for Babar the Elephant and discussed creating a special with Atkinson-Crawley. Babar and Father Christmas was one of the most expensive specials at the time, with a budget of $600,000.

Sheldon Wiseman and Kevin Gillis formed Hinton Animation Studios, which recruited from Atkinson-Crawley's employment. In 1987, Stevens attempted to aid the financial ailing company by raising $6 million through a public offering under the name The Crawley Group, but the stock market crashed three days before his presentation. The company had $4 million in debt by 1988, and owed a large amount of unpaid wages causing more employees to join Hinton Animation.

== Filmography ==
=== Television specials ===
Year	Title
1978	The Little Brown Burro
1979	The New Misadventures of Ichabod Crane
1979	Tukiki and His Search for a Merry Christmas
1980	The Christmas Raccoons
1981	The Trolls and the Christmas Express
1981	The Raccoons on Ice
1983	The Care Bears in the Land Without Feelings
1983	The Legend of Hiawatha
1983	The Raccoons and the Lost Star
1984	The Care Bears Battle the Freeze Machine
1985	The Body Electric
1985	Rumpelstiltskin
1985	The Velveteen Rabbit
1985	For Better or For Worse: The Bestest Present
1986	The Tin Soldier
1986	Babar and Father Christmas
1987	The Nightingale

=== Television series ===
Year	Title	Notes
1985–86	The Raccoons	Season 1 (11 episodes)
1985–86	OWL/TV	animation
1986–87	The Adventures of Teddy Ruxpin	Seasons 1–2 (65 episodes)
1988	Dennis the Menace	Season 2 (13 episodes)
1988	COPS	Season 1 (11 episodes)

=== Direct-to-video films ===
Year	Title	Distributor
1984	The Raccoons: Let's Dance!	Embassy Home Entertainment
1987	Meerkats	Ammex Productions

=== Feature films ===
Year	Title	Distributor	Notes
1981	Heavy Metal	Columbia Pictures	"Harry Canyon" and "B-17" segments

=== Short films ===
Year	Title	Co-production with
1974	Santa	
1974	Yesterday's Farm	Holt, Rinehart and Winston of Canada
1975	Camp Roofless	Department of National Defence
1975	Amenita	Pyramid Films
1976	Let's Talk Business	Department of Regional Economic Expansion
1976	Propst[r]ike	Transport Canada
1977	Post and Beam Construction (slide film)	Canadian Wood Council; Eastern Forest Products Laboratory
1980	Wood Construction (slide film)	Canadian Wood Council; Eastern Forest Products Laboratory
1980s	Things That Go Bump: Client/Counselor Relationship and Other Things That Go Bump	Canadian Employment and Immigration Commission
1981	Groups That Work: Part One	Canadian Employment and Immigration Commission; Telescene Productions
1981	Groups That Work: Part Two	Canadian Employment and Immigration Commission; Telescene Productions
1983	A Piece of Sunshine	Ontario Hydro

== See also ==
- Nelvana
- Cookie Jar Group
- CinéGroupe

== Works cited ==
- Mazurkewich, Karen (1999). Cartoon Capers: The History of Canadian Animators. McArthur & Company Publishing. ISBN 1-55278-093-7.
