= The Trolls and the Christmas Express =

1981 Christmas TV special

- Written by: Mel Waskin
- Story by: Mel Waskin; Bill Walker
- Directed by: John R. Gaug
- Voices of: Hans Conried; Paul Soles; Len Carlson; Billie Mae Richards; Carl Banas
- Narrated by: Roger Miller
- Music by: Hagood Hardy
- Country of origin: Canada
- Original language: English

Production
- Producers: Beryl Friesen; W.H. Stevens Jr.
- Cinematography: Ron Haines; Steve Sanderson; Colette Brière
- Editor: Gerald Tripp
- Running time: 30 minutes
- Production companies: Atkinson Film-Arts; Titlecraft; Pooled Film Services

Original release
- Network: HBO
- Release: December 9, 1981

The Trolls and the Christmas Express is a 1981 animated Christmas television special produced by the Canadian-based Atkinson Film-Arts. It was originally broadcast on HBO on December 9, 1981.

== Plot ==
Six troublesome trolls, whose leader is called Troglo (voiced by Hans Conried), use their mischievous magic to sabotage Christmas by infiltrating Santa's village disguised as elves. After twenty-five days of wreaking havoc, but still not completely ruining Christmas, the trolls get a devilishly clever idea: on the day before Christmas Eve, they get the reindeer dancing and singing all night long. The next day, the reindeer are so tired that they cannot find the energy to pull Santa's sleigh. Although it is likely that Christmas is ruined, the elves quickly devise a plan to link the train from Santa's village with tracks that travel all over the world so that Santa can deliver the toys by using the Christmas Express.

Determined to stop this contingency plan, the trolls are forced to become ever more blatant in their sabotage until they are noticed. When Santa asks what their grievance is, the trolls complain they cannot stand the jolliness that seems to shut them out. At that, Santa points a certain fact when he has his elves sing "Deck the Halls" with particular emphasis on the word "troll" in the lyrics. At that, Santa and the elves explain that the verb, "to troll", means to sing or play in a jovial manner, and thus trolls have a place in Christmas. At this revelation, the trolls are so moved that they wish to make amends and agree to help the train make its delivery run.

== Cast ==
- Roger Miller – Narrator
- Hans Conried – Troglo
- Paul Soles
- Len Carlson
- Billie Mae Richards
- Carl Banas

== Songs and performers ==
- "The Christmas Express" – composed by Hagood Hardy, performed by Roger Miller
- "The Elves' Song" – composed by Hagood Hardy, performed by the Elves
- "The Trolls' Song" – composed by Hagood Hardy, performed by the Trolls

== Home media ==
The Trolls and the Christmas Express was released on VHS by Paramount Home Video in 1985 which has long been out of print. It was re-released in 1995 by Questar Video as part of the Christmas Cartoon Adventures VHS set. The special was released as a manufacture-on-demand DVD-R in August 2008 as part of the "Holiday Classics" series by Phoenix Learning Group, Inc.

== See also ==
- List of Christmas films
