= Carl Banas =

Canadian radio host and voice actor (1929–2020)

- Born: January 23, 1929; Toronto, Ontario, Canada
- Died: April 1, 2020 (aged 91)
- Other name: Carl Banis
- Occupations: Radio personality, actor
- Years active: 1948–1998

Carl Banas (January 23, 1929 – April 1, 2020) was a Canadian radio personality and voice actor known for his voice roles in Rudolph the Red-Nosed Reindeer (1964) and The Raccoons (1980–1991). As a television actor, he appeared in the series Wojeck as police detective Byron James, and provided voices for numerous TV series and features. He was also known as a radio personality on Toronto radio stations CKFM-FM and MIX 99.9 (currently known as Virgin Radio 999) in the 1970s and 1980s. He mainly hosted weekday evenings, and was known for his deep voice, smooth manner, and vignettes about Toronto. Additionally, he performed live readings of Charles Dickens' A Christmas Carol every year before Christmas, utilizing his voice skills to play multiple characters. Polydor Records recorded and published one performance under the title Charles Dickens' A Christmas Carol and Other Yuletide Favorites.

In 1987, Banas moved to CJEZ 97.3 "Easy 97" (later known as 97.3 EZ Rock and currently as "Boom 97.3") where he continued hosting weekday evenings until he left the station and retired from radio. Banas died on April 1, 2020, at the age of 91.

== Filmography ==
=== Film ===
Year	Title	Role	Notes	Ref.
1972	Festival of Family Classics	Multiple roles		
1974	Vengeance is Mine	Radio announcer		
1976	Noah's Animals	Lion	Voice	
1976	Trillium, Affectionately Yours	Narrator	Voice	
1978	Battle of York, 1813	Narrator		
1989	Babar: The Movie	Old Tusk	Voice	

=== Television ===
Year	Title	Role	Notes	Ref.
1960	The New Adventures of Pinocchio	Cricket	130 episodes	
1961	Tales of the Wizard of Oz	Dandy Lion, Wizard of Oz, Ham the Flying Monkey, Maxamillion Cinema, additional voices	Voice, main role; 68 episodes	
1964	Return to Oz	Dandy Lion, Wizard of Oz	Voice, television film	
1964	Rudolph the Red-Nosed Reindeer	Foreman Elf, Train with Square Wheels	Voice, television film	
1965	Prince Planet	Dan Dynamo		
1966	The King Kong Show	Additional Voices		
1966	Wojeck	Sgt. Byron James	20 episodes	
1966	The Marvel Super Heroes	Bucky Barnes	Voice	
1967	Rocket Robin Hood	Titanor, Dr. Manta	Voice, 5 episodes	
1967	Spider-Man	Scorpion, Charles Cameo, Dr. Manta	Voice, 5 episodes; uncredited	
1968	Festival	Steve	Guest star; 1 episode	
1969	The Smokey Bear Show	Gabby, Freddy Fume, Floyd Fox, additional voices	Voice, 2 episodes	
1969	McQueen	Extra	1 episode	
1970	The Reluctant Dragon & Mr. Toad Show	Ugliola, King Herman, additional voices	Voice	
1971	Tales from Muppetland: The Frog Prince	Sweetums	Voice, television film	
1977	King of the Beasts	Lion	Voice, television film	
1977	Math Patrol	Mr. Big	Main role; Voice	
1978	The Little Brown Burro	Narrator	TV film	
1980	Last of the Red-Hot Dragons	King Lion	Voice, television film	
1980	The Christmas Raccoons	Schaeffer	Voice, television film	
1981	The Raccoons on Ice	Schaeffer	Voice, television film	
1981	News from Zoos	Charlie	Voice	
1981	The Trolls and the Christmas Express	Additional voices	Voice, television film	
1983	The Raccoons and the Lost Star	Schaeffer	Voice, television film	
1984	The Raccoons: Let's Dance!	Schaeffer	Voice, television film	
1985–1991	The Raccoons	Schaeffer, Mr. Mammoth, Bear, Mr. Willow, Squaredance Callar	Voice, main role; 44 episodes	
1987	Hello Kitty’s Furry Tale Theater	Grandpa Kitty	Voice	
1989	Babar	Old Tusk	Voice	
1993	The Busy World of Richard Scarry	Additional voices	36 episodes	
1998	Dumb Bunnies	Grampa Uppity	1 episode	

Preceded by None	Performer of Sweetums; 1971	Succeeded by Richard Hunt
