= The Raccoons =

Canadian animated television series

- Title card
- Genre: Comedy
- Created by: Kevin Gillis
- Directed by: Kevin Gillis
- Voices of: Len Carlson; Bob Dermer; Carl Banas; Michael Magee; Linda Feige (season 1); Susan Roman (seasons 2–5); Marvin Goldhar; Fred Little (specials 1–3); Sharon Lewis; Nick Nichols; Keith Hampshire (season 5); Lisa Lougheed (seasons 4–5); Noam Zylberman; Stuart Stone (season 5)
- Narrated by: Rich Little (specials 1–3); Geoffrey Winter
- Theme music composer: Kevin Gillis; Jon Stroll
- Ending theme: "Run with Us" by Steve Lunt (season 1), Lisa Lougheed (seasons 2–5)
- Country of origin: Canada
- Original language: English
- No. of seasons: 5
- No. of episodes: 60 (plus 4 specials) (list of episodes)

Production
- Executive producer: Sheldon S. Wiseman
- Producer: Kevin Gillis
- Running time: 25 minutes
- Production companies: Gillis-Wiseman Productions; Evergreen Raccoons Television Productions

Original release
- Network: CBC
- Release: 4 July 1985 (Note: In Canada, it premiered on 11 November 1985.) – 19 March 1991 (Note: In the United States, it ended on 28 August 1992.)

The Raccoons is a Canadian animated series that ran on CBC from 11 November 1985, to 19 March 1991, in Canada and on Disney Channel from 4 July 1985, to 28 August 1992, in the U.S., with three preceding television specials from its inception in 1980, and one direct-to-video special in 1984. The franchise was created by Kevin Gillis with the co-operation of the Canadian Broadcasting Corporation.

== Synopsis ==
The series revolves around Bert Raccoon and married couple Ralph and Melissa Raccoon, of whom Bert is a friend and roommate. The series mostly involves the trio's efforts against the industrialist forces of greedy aardvark millionaire Cyril Sneer, who regularly tries to destroy the forest for personal wealth. The Raccoons always save their forest from Cyril's schemes, with help from their forest friends including Schaeffer, a gentle Old English Sheepdog; Cedric, Cyril's college graduate son; and Sophia Tutu, Cedric's girlfriend. As the series progresses, Cyril becomes more of a sympathetic character, eventually becoming an antihero, becoming more responsible in his priorities and business practices.

Originally, the story was set in a kind of hidden world in the Evergreen Forest where a small human family of a forest ranger and his children reside unaware of the struggles taking place out of sight. The second season had these human characters removed as the premise shifted to an unambiguous fantasy world of a sophisticated humanoid animal version of Canada with complex transportation systems, broadcasting media and heavy industry, amongst other things. In addition, Ralph's relatives become regular characters, especially his young nephew and niece, Bentley, the insecure child technology prodigy, and Lisa, the statuesque athletic teenager who became an understated love interest for Bert.

Unlike many other cartoons of its time, it handled action, humour, and romance in a fairly sophisticated manner, while remaining sufficiently uncomplicated for younger viewers. Lessons featured in the series mainly focused on environmentalism. It also covered other topics, including friendship and teamwork.

== Episodes ==
Series	Episodes	Originally released	
Series	Episodes	First released	Last released
Specials	4	17 December 1980	13 September 1984
1	11	4 July 1985	27 December 1986
2	10	2 November 1987	13 November 1987
3	13	7 November 1988	23 November 1988
4	13	6 November 1989	23 November 1989
5	13	12 November 1990	19 March 1991

== Characters ==
=== Main ===
- Bert Raccoon (voiced by Len Carlson) is the main protagonist of the series. He is Ralph and Melissa's houseguest and is their best friend from childhood. An energetic raccoon with a lot of imagination, Bert always likes to seek out adventure and to live life to the fullest. Although he is impulsive and prone to foolish decisions, he has a kind heart.
- Ralph Raccoon (voiced by Bob Dermer) and Melissa Raccoon (voiced by Rita Coolidge (specials 1–2), Dottie West (special 3), Linda Feige (season 1) and Susan Roman (seasons 2–5)) are the happily married couple who live in the "Raccoondominium" with their more-or-less permanent houseguest Bert. Ralph tolerates Bert's antics to some extent and knows his heart is in the right place, but it does not prevent him from getting frustrated by them. He is also the founder of "The Evergreen Standard" newspaper. Melissa is the more sensible of the three raccoons, and is always there to give the boys a push in the right direction. She often enjoys a good laugh too, usually when Bert or Ralph act silly or when Cyril's plans go embarrassingly awry.
- Cedric Sidney Sneer (voiced by Fred Little (specials 1–3) and Marvin Goldhar (series)) is Cyril Sneer's nerdy son and Bert Raccoon's best friend, and heir to the Sneer fortune. Since the special The Raccoons on Ice Cedric has earned a crush on Sophia and usually acts nervous around her. In the specials, he was completely passive and subservient to his father, but gradually becomes more assertive as the series goes on.
- Schaeffer (voiced by Carl Banas) is a large sheepdog, who is friends with the Raccoons. Originally portrayed as slow and dim-witted in the original specials, he quickly became one of the smartest characters on the series. Schaeffer eventually opened the Blue Spruce Cafe as a bartender and assists with the Evergreen Standard's technical needs.
- Broo (voiced by Sharon Lewis) is a sheepdog puppy who seems to favour Bert as his owner in season 2 after the human characters were dropped from the show.
- Sophia Tutu (voiced by Sharon Lewis) is Cedric's ditzy girlfriend, who is a superb swan glider and diver. Although clearly an aardvark, she is much more humanoid in appearance than either Cedric or Cyril. Sophie is very feminine, but likes to ride bikes with Cedric. She once participated in the Evergreen Games, coming in third place. Sophie was phased out of the show in later seasons.
- Cyril Sneer (voiced by Michael Magee): Originally the main villain of the series, Cyril is an aardvark, with a long, pink nose, a ruthless and greedy businessman and Cedric's father. Although Cyril starts off villainous, he later softens up, becoming distinctly less so as the series progresses, though he retains his treacherous, greedy nature. Despite his money-grubbing ways, he has shown to authentically love his son and tries grooming him to take over the family business. He has a soft spot for Bentley and Lisa, Ralph's nephew and niece. He has a strict matter of pride about keeping promises, as shown in the episodes "Going It Alone!" and "Trouble Shooter!".
- Snag (voiced by Michael Magee) is Cyril and Cedric Sneer's (non-anthropomorphic) pet dog. He has blue fur, a nose similar to his aardvark-owners' and a bad temper that rivals Cyril, but he also loves Cedric and once saved him from a fire.
- The Pigs (voiced by Nick Nichols (Pig One (special 3 – episodes 50; 58)), Keith Hampshire (Pig One (episodes 51–60)), Len Carlson (Pigs Two and Three (series)) and Fred Little (Pig Three (special 3))) are Cyril's three bumbling henchmen and assistants. They are almost never referred to by name, as they are simply listed as Pig One, Two and Three in the credits, although they occasionally refer to one another as "Lloyd". Fans of the show have referred Pig One as "Lloyd" and the other two as "Boyd" and "Floyd". Creator Kevin Gillis said their names were "Lloyd, Lloyd and their somewhat gullible brother, Floyd", but some fans point out this makes no sense from a logical point of view for two characters to have the same name.
- The Bears (voiced by Len Carlson, Bob Dermer and Carl Banas) are Cyril Sneer's additional henchmen, workers, butlers, soldiers, spies, etc.
- Bentley Raccoon (voiced by Noam Zylberman (episodes 16–54) and Stuart Stone (as Stu Stone) (episodes 55–60)) is George and Nicole's son. He is an expert with computers, and is a very typical younger kid, with a tendency to overemphasize his personal setbacks. He often favours houseguest Bert while Cyril Sneer thinks highly of him. He is originally introduced as Ralph's cousin in his first appearance but later retconned into his nephew.
- Lisa Raccoon (voiced by Lisa Lougheed) is Ralph's niece and Bentley's teenage basketball-playing sister, who becomes a prominent character in Season 5, after her first appearance in the fourth-season episode "Spring Fever", where she comes to visit.

=== Supporting ===
- Dan the Forest Ranger (voiced by Rupert Holmes (special 1), Leo Sayer (special 2), John Schneider (special 3), Kevin Gillis (special 4, uncredited)) and Murray Cruchley (series)) is the human caretaker of the Evergreen Forest, as well as the father of Tommy and Julie and owner of Schaeffer and Broo during the specials and Season 1. He is shown to be a single father as there is no mention of the mother of his children in neither the specials nor the series.
- Tommy (voiced by Hadley Kay (specials) and Noam Zylberman (series)) is Ranger Dan's son and one of Schaeffer and Broo's original owners as well as Julie's younger brother.
- Julie (voiced by Tammy Bourne (specials) and Vanessa Lindores (series)) is Ranger Dan's daughter and one of Schaeffer and Broo's original owners as well as Tommy's older sister.
- Mr. Mammoth (voiced by Carl Banas) is a rhinoceros who is the richest, most powerful character on the show; he speaks in incoherent mumbles that are translated by his assistant.
- Sidekick (voiced by Rick Jones (Seasons 1–2) and Dan Hennessey (Season 5)) is Mr. Mammoth's canary assistant who translates his grumbles.
- Mr. Knox (voiced by Len Carlson) is an acquaintance of Cyril Sneer and a Southern crocodile business mogul. He is married to Lady Baden-Baden, and is the owner of the television company K.N.O.X. TV. He and Cyril are rivals, though it is a friendly one.
- Lady Baden-Baden (voiced by Bob Dermer) is a wealthy, melodramatic hen who eventually marries Mr. Knox. She was a theatre actress in her younger days, and now is an enthusiastic patron of the arts. She later becomes mayor of the Evergreen Forest.
- Professor Witherspoon Smedley-Smythe (voiced by Len Carlson) is a goat who runs the Evergreen Museum.
- Dr. Canard (voiced by Len Carlson) is a duck who is Cyril's doctor.
- Mr. Willow (voiced by Carl Banas) is a friendly polar bear who is the owner of Willow's General Store.
- Mrs. Suey-Ellen Pig (voiced by Nonnie Griffin) is the pigs' mother. She appears in two episodes, "Mom's the Word", where her name is revealed, and "Promises Promises".
- Milton Midas (voiced by Len Carlson) is an eagle businessman and scam artist. He is responsible for the poisoning of the fishing hole at Rippling Pond in the series' penultimate episode "The One That Got Away".
- George and Nicole Raccoon (voiced by Dan Hennessey and Elizabeth Hanna) are Ralph's respective older brother and sister-in-law and the parents of Bentley and Lisa Raccoon. They were once wanderers. George hosts "Chef Surprise", a cooking show on KNOX-TV.

== Cast ==
=== Main ===
- Len Carlson – Bert Raccoon / Boyd (Pig Two) / Floyd (Pig Three) / Mr. Knox / Additional Voices
- Michael Magee – Cyril Sneer / Snag
- Bob Dermer – Ralph Raccoon / Lady Baden-Baden / Additional Voices
- Rita Coolidge – Melissa Raccoon (1980–1981)
- Dottie West – Melissa Raccoon (1983)
- Linda Feige – Melissa Raccoon (1985–1986)
- Susan Roman – Melissa Raccoon (1987–1991) / Additional Voices
- Marvin Goldhar – Cedric Sneer / Additional Voices
- Sharon Lewis – Sophia Tutu / Broo
- Carl Banas – Schaeffer / Bears / Mr. Mammoth / Mr. Willow
- Nick Nichols – Lloyd (Pig One) (1983–1990; 1991)
- Keith Hampshire – Lloyd (Pig One) (1990–1991)
- Rupert Holmes – Dan the Forest Ranger (1980)
- Leo Sayer – Dan the Forest Ranger (1981)
- John Schneider – Dan the Forest Ranger (1983)
- Kevin Gillis – Dan the Forest Ranger (1984)
- Murray Cruchley – Dan the Forest Ranger (1985–1986)
- Noam Zylberman – Tommy / Bentley Raccoon (1987–1990)
- Stuart Stone – Bentley Raccoon (1990–1991) / Danny
- Vanessa Lindores – Julie
- Dan Hennessey – George Raccoon / Sidekick (1990)
- Elizabeth Hanna – Nicole Raccoon
- Lisa Lougheed – Lisa Raccoon
- Geoffrey Winter – Narrator

=== Additional voices ===
- Debra McGrath – Nurse Peck
- Les Lye – Samaritan "Sammy" Sneer
- Rick Jones – Sidekick (1985–1987)
- Derek Diorio – Haggis Lamborgini
- Pauline Rennie – Aunt Gertie
- Nonnie Griffin – Mrs. Suey-Ellen Pig
- Bob Segarini – Woodchuck Berry
- Barry Bailey – Troy Malone
- Jeremiah McCann – Bonneville Knox
- Peter Messaline – The Great Tromboni
- Kay Hawtrey – Miss Primrose
- Bruno Gerussi – Edward Miller
- Barbara Frum – Miss Barbara LaFrum
- Theresa Sears – Ingrid Bellamour
- Terrence Scammell – Classmate #1
- Tara Strong – Donna (credited as Tara Charendoff)
- Lisa Yamanaka – Patty

== Production ==
The Raccoons franchise was originally conceived by Canadian TV personality Kevin Gillis in the 1970s, while appearing in shows like Celebrity Cooks and Yes You Can. The initial idea for the show was created by Gillis and columnist Gary Dunford. They drew their inspiration for Ralph Raccoon from a dilemma that happened at a cottage in Ottawa. Dunford backed out, but Gillis took his idea to Ottawa lawyer Sheldon S. Wiseman, who saw a potential in Gillis' idea and put together a large group of animators, musicians and writers to create the first special to star the characters known as The Christmas Raccoons. Production on the special began in 1979 and was completed the following year, and the special was broadcast on 17 December 1980 on CBC Television. It also aired in many countries all over the world, including the U.S. and the United Kingdom. The special was a huge hit and its success resulted in two sequel specials The Raccoons on Ice and The Raccoons and the Lost Star and a direct-to-video special, The Raccoons: Let's Dance!.

In 1981, US television networks CBS, NBC and ABC approached Sheldon Wiseman about producing a 13-episode Raccoons television series. In 1984, the Canadian Broadcasting Corporation and the Disney Channel began funding on the television series, which cost about $4.5 million to make. In the U.S., the show was run on Disney Channel from 4 July 1985 until 28 August 1992. In Canada, it was shown on CBC on Monday evenings for the first season and was shown in a block consisting of The Wonderful World of Disney and Jim Henson's Fraggle Rock on Sundays for the next two seasons before moving to Wednesdays in its fourth, sharing an hour block with The Beachcombers and then eventually Tuesdays in its fifth and final season.

=== Music ===
The series had a new wave soundtrack including the theme song "Run with Us" by cast member Lisa Lougheed. Season 1 ended with a different version of the song, performed by Stephen Lunt. In the first season, Canadian singer Luba performed several songs, several of which were later re-recorded by Lougheed for use in other seasons. There were also several songs performed by other musicians such as Rita Coolidge and Rupert Holmes who performed songs for the first special, Leo Sayer and Coolidge again for the second, and John Schneider and Dottie West for the final TV special.

Due to contractual reasons, Schneider's vocals on three of the songs were replaced with Frank Floyd and Hank Martin when they were released on the accompanying soundtrack album for the fourth special. Rory Dodd, The Dior Bros. (Kevin Gillis and Jon Stroll under a pseudonym), and many other musicians also had songs performed, although somewhat rarely compared to the aforementioned people. According to Jon Stroll, Frank Floyd, the frontman of the 1970s R&B funk group The Writers, was originally selected to be the main male singer for the series but backed out at the last minute. Needing a replacement, they brought in Curtis King Jr. at the suggestion of backup singer Valerie Wilson.

The earlier version of "Run with Us", like quite a few of the other songs from The Raccoons, were never officially released. The songs from the first two specials were released on the album Lake Freeze – The Raccoons Songtrack in 1983. A soundtrack for the fourth special was released in 1984, but featured vocals from Frank Floyd and Hank Martin to replace John Schneider. Nine of the songs from the series featured on Lougheed's album Evergreen Nights, released in 1987. Although Lougheed only sang some of the songs (sometimes in duets), others were sung by other artists (Curtis King Jr. and Stephen Lunt). The French version of "Run with Us", as well as most of Luba and Lisa Lougheed's songs, was performed by the Quebecois Canadian singer Jano Bergeron with "Run with Us" being renamed in French to "Viens Vers Nous".

The instrumental music was composed by Kevin Gillis and Jon Stroll and performed largely by the National Arts Centre Orchestra from Ottawa, Canada, though due to contractual reasons, they were credited as "The National Raccoon Orchestra" and later, "The Royal Raccoon Orchestra" on the accompanying soundtrack albums. Most of the instrumental cues heard in the series were actually recorded for The Raccoons and the Lost Star and re-used. Only six of the instrumental tunes (two from The Raccoons on Ice and four from The Raccoons and the Lost Star) have ever been released officially (they can be found on the Lake Freeze and Let's Dance! albums).

=== Animation ===
From 1980 until 1986, Canadian animation studio Atkinson Film-Arts provided the animation for the four specials and first season of the series. (Note: All episodes in season 1 say in the end credits "Animation Facility: Atkinson Film-Arts".) In 1986, after producing the first 11 episodes, Hinton Animation Studios took over to animate the remaining seasons of the show (seasons 2–5). (Note: All episodes in season 2–5 say in the end credits "Produced at Hinton Animation Studios Inc.")

== Telecast and home media ==
The Raccoons ran on CBC for six years from 11 November 1985 to 19 March 1991 in Canada. It was also broadcast in several countries around the world, including the U.S. and the United Kingdom, as well as many countries in continental Europe. In Canada, it aired on CBC on Monday evenings for the first season and was shown in a block consisting of The Wonderful World of Disney and Fraggle Rock on Sundays for the next two seasons until moving to Wednesdays in its fourth, sharing an hour block with The Beachcombers and then eventually Tuesdays in its fifth and final season. In the U.S., the show ran on Disney Channel for seven years from 4 July 1985 to 28 August 1992. In the late 1990s, Trio, a now-defunct U.S. cable network then partially owned by the CBC, aired repeats of the show.

In the United Kingdom, the BBC broadcast the series from 1987 to 1992, with repeats until 2002, as part of its children's programming strand Children's BBC (now called CBBC). During this time, it was shown on the Saturday morning children's show Going Live!. In the late 2000s, repeats of the show aired on Boomerang.

In the U.S., Embassy Home Entertainment released the specials and Season 1 on home video from 1982 until 1987. Embassy also released the specials on LaserDisc, CED and Betamax formats. Other distributors, such as Catalyst and GoodTimes Entertainment also released the Raccoons specials and episodes on VHS.

In the United Kingdom, Embassy Home Entertainment released the four Raccoons specials on VHS in the mid-1980s, before the distribution rights went to Channel 5 Video (a division of Polygram Video) in 1986. They re-released the four specials on video, and released another video called The Raccoons Big Surprise with two Season 1 episodes "Surprise Attack" and "Going It Alone" (Cat. No. CFV 05042). Then, three videos with Season 2 episodes were released, the first two were released by Picture Music International (PMI) that included "Double Play" and "The Sweet Smell of Success" on volume 1, released in 1988 and then "Blast from the Past" and "Power Trip" on volume 2, released in 1989. Then Video Collection International released a third tape which contained the episodes "Stop The Clock" and "The Artful Dodger" on 13 August 1990 (Cat No. VC1191). That same tape was re-released again by Video Collection International on 22 July 1991, as part of their Children's Club range (Cat No. KK0019).

In 2003, Morningstar Entertainment released the show on DVD for the first time. Two nine-episode boxsets were released, each containing three discs that were also available separately. The discs were released without any region coding in NTSC format. The first set contained nine out of the ten episodes from season 2 (omitting "Stop the Clock") and the second set contained the first nine episodes of season 3. The extras include character bios, a chance to "create your own" scene from The Raccoons and Raccoon-A-Roma DVD-ROM content, like QuickTime animated sequences. For this release, the series' voice actor Len Carlson also reprised his role as Bert during menus and gave in-character commentary before and after episodes. Both sets are now out of print, and no North American DVD release has come out since then.

A two-disc Region 2 PAL DVD release of the complete season 1 was released in the United Kingdom on 17 September 2007 through Fabulous Films. The bonus features on set 1 were duplicated from the Canadian release, mainly the create a scene and Raccoon-A-Roma DVD-ROM content. Fabulous Films later released a DVD entitled Three Adventures With The Raccoons on 7 April 2008. This DVD contained the first three episodes of Season 1 ("Surprise Attack", "Going It Alone" and "A Night to Remember") with no extras. Season 2 was released on 20 April 2009 by Fabulous Films in another two-disc set. DVD extras on the set include character model sheets and a documentary.

In September 2009, MORE Entertainment released an eight-disc DVD set in Germany, containing all 60 episodes (7–8 per disc) and no extras. Later, in November 2013, MORE released a DVD featuring all four Raccoons specials. The language track for complete series set and four specials is German only.

In December 2009, the first season of The Raccoons was released on iTunes in Canada. It was also released on iTunes in the U.S. in April 2010. The first two seasons were released on DVD to Netflix in the U.S. in early-2010 and in Canada in August 2011.

As of 2020, the 4K-remastered, full-episode series is now available on YouTube.

Since 2023, the series in its 4K-remastered form has aired in repeats on Boomerang in Canada.

== Reception ==
The Raccoons was well-received by critics. The New York Times, in its review for their second TV special, said "the Raccoons are an adorable lot, supported nicely by an attractive production". Variety praised the third special, The Raccoons and the Lost Star, calling it "a rollicking good adventure filled with space-age animation, high-tech gadgetry, lilting tunes, a lovable sheepdog, and the delightful Raccoons team".

In 2022, series creator Kevin Gillis said that the show was seeing a resurgence of interest, speculating that it was due to the "original audience now having young families of their own and want[ing] to reach back to what helped form their early lives".

The show was nominated for many awards, including a Gemini Award for Best Sound and Best Writing, and won the Gemini for Best Animated Series.

== Legacy ==
In 1990, Bert and Lisa were named the mascots of the Canadian Olympic team. That year, the Canadian Junior Olympics were held.

Its theme song "Run with Us" was also featured in the 2011 film Hobo with a Shotgun.

In 2022, the show was featured in the series-premiere episode of Son of a Critch.

Children's novels based on the series were published by Cardiff-based publisher Candy Jar Books in 2024.
