= Jano Bergeron =

Canadian singer

Jeannine "Jano" Bergeron is a Quebec singer who was born in Chapais, Quebec in 1958. This singer, actress and entertainer is best known on the Quebec music scene with the commercial success of the song Recherché in 1986, as well as performing the French version of Run With Us (titled Viens Vers Nous) and other songs for the French version of The Raccoons.

She was a co-owner of a shop, called Flame on St. Laurent Boulevard, which specialized in makeup and tattooing, which is now closed.

== Singer ==
After moving to Montreal she played the bar circuit for a few years. In 1982 she won a trophy for her performances on stage. Jano Bergeron was spotted by Pierre Dubord, an artistic director for CBS Records. She then recorded her first album Jano in 1985.

She performed at the Spectrum de Montréal in July 1985. That same year, she performed a Pot-Pourri (medley) of songs at the Gala de l'ADISQ.

Jano Bergeron released her second album, Féline, in 1986. The album success was powered by the significant success of its first single, Recherché. A show of the same name was presented at the Harlequin Theater in Montreal the following year.

In the spring of 1991, she launched a fourth album (entitled Tout Passe), in which she explores more of a jazz and blues style. Following disappointing sales, Jano Bergeron decided to change careers, leaving the music scene and taking a sabbatical.

Her 1985 song Recherché was featured on the compilation Québectronique 80, published by Duchesne et du Rêve in 2005.

== Actress ==
She played the role of Nico Laliberté in the television show Épopée Rock from 1984 to 1990, it aired on Télé.

== Albums ==
1. Jano (1985)
2. Féline (1986)
3. Différente (1988)
4. Tout passe (1991)
5. Histoire Inachevée (1997)
