= Hadley Kay =

Canadian film, stage, television and voice actor (born 1972 or 1973)

- Born: 1972 or 1973 (age 53–54)
- Other name: Hadley Kaye
- Occupation: Actor
- Years active: 1979–present
- Agent: Innovative Artists
- Website: www.hadleykay.com

Hadley Kay (born c. 1972/1973) is a Canadian film, stage, television, and voice actor best known for his appearances in The Care Bears Movie, Care Bears Movie II: A New Generation, and Popples.

== Career ==
At age six, he made his film debut opposite Bill Murray in the 1979 comedy Meatballs. Kay also appeared in Superman II, the Star Wars-based animated series Ewoks, Inspector Gadget, Beverly Hills Teens, and the earlier The Raccoons specials. Kay was the first voice actor to provide the voice of Scooby-Doo following the death of Don Messick. His other television credits include guest appearances in The Littlest Hobo, Bizarre, Kung Fu: The Legend Continues, Bakugan: Gundalian Invaders and Bakugan: Mechtanium Surge.

== Filmography ==
Year	Title	Role	Notes
1979	The Wayne & Shuster Superspecial		Episode: "Star Shtick"
1979	Meatballs	Bradley	
1979	King of Kensington	Sean	Episode: "Diabolical Plots"
1980	Head On	Michelle's Patient	
1980	Superman II	Jason	
1980	The Christmas Raccoons	Tommy (voice)	Television film
1981	The Raccoons on Ice	Tommy (voice)	Television film
1983	The Magic Show	Boy in Audience	
1983	The Littlest Hobo	Nathaniel	2 episodes
1983	The Raccoons and the Lost Star	Tommy (voice)	Television film
1983	Inspector Gadget	Additional voices	65 episodes
1983	American Playhouse	Marco	Episode: "Overdrawn at the Memory Bank"
1984	The Raccoons: Let's Dance!	Tommy (voice)	Video short
1984	The Guardian	Jason	Television film
1984	Bambinger	Sammy	Short film
1985	The Care Bears Movie	Nicholas Cherrywood (voice)	
1985	Tucker and the Horse Thief	Solomon Weil	Television film
1985	Ewoks	Oobel, Shaman's nephew (voices)	13 episodes
1986	Care Bears Movie II: A New Generation	Dark Heart (voice)	
1986	Popples	P.C. (voice)	Unknown episodes
1987	My Pet Monster	Blaine	Episode: "Boogie Board Blues"
1987	Beverly Hills Teens	Radley Coleman (voice)	48 episodes
1988	Garbage Pail Kids	Additional voices	3 episodes
1988	Dead Ringers	Delivery Boy	
1988	The Raccoons	Bix Wheelie (voice)	Episode: "Life in the Fast Lane!"
1989–1991	Babar	Additional voices	65 episodes
1989–1991	Beetlejuice	Prince Vince (voice)	3 episodes
1990	First Resort	Fast Eddie	Unknown episodes
1991–1997	Rupert	Podgy Pig (voice)	15 episodes
1993–1994	Tales from the Cryptkeeper	Herman	2 episodes
1994	Kero kero Keroppi	Additional voices	Direct-to-video
1994–1996	The Busy World of Richard Scarry	Sprout Goat, Dennis Elephant, additional voices	
1995	Kung Fu: The Legend Continues	Rob	Episode: "May I Walk with You"
1995	Blood & Donuts	Axel	
1996	Monster by Mistake	Keebo	Unknown episodes
1997	Rugrats	Bellhop, Clown, Oarsman (voices)	Episode: "Vacation"
1997	Johnny Bravo	Scooby-Doo (voice)	2 episodes
1997	The Fanatics	Elliot Merkin	Uncredited
1997	A Rugrats Vacation	Head Clown, Bellhop, Oarsman (voices)	Direct-to-video
1998	Oh Yeah Cartoons!	Cop	1 episode
1999	Inspector Gadget: Gadget's Greatest Gadgets	Ballah (voice)	Direct-to-video
2005	Harry and His Bucket Full of Dinosaurs	Silly Pencil (voice)	Episode: "The Silly Pencil"
2006	Yin Yang Yo!	Rainbowmane (voice)	Episode: "The Trouble with Two-ni-corns/Scarf it Up!"
2006	Superman II: The Richard Donner Cut	Jason	
2008–2011	Turbo Dogs	Stinkbert (voice)	26 episodes
2010	Pure Pwnage	Fight Announcer	Episode: "Pwnageddon"
2010	The Dating Guy	Mysterious Figure (voice)	Episode: "VJ and the Holy Boner"
2011	How (Not) to Become a Vampire	Additional voices	Short film
2012	Beyblade: Shogun Steel	Ian (voice, English dub)	Episode: "The All-Out Mid-Air Battle"
2013	Beyblade: Metal Fusion	Ian (voice, English dub)	Episode: "The Legend and the Evil Combine"
2016	Numb Chucks	Elvis (voice)	Episode: "'Twas the Fight Before Christmas/O Evil Tree, O Evil Tree"
2019	Let's Go Luna!	Dr. Flavio (voice)	Episode: "Andy's Big Show/Leo Moves It"
2020	Arthur	Nicky (voice)	Episode: "An Arthur Thanksgiving"
2021	Pikwik Pack	Willy Wigglesteam (voice)	Episode: "The Rickety Railway/Ship Wrecked"

Preceded by Don Messick	Voice of Scooby-Doo; 1997 Johnny Bravo	Succeeded by Scott Innes
