= Popples (1986 TV series) =

Children's animated television series

- The show's logo with Party Popple
- Created by: Marie Cisterino; Janet Jones; Fran Kariotakis; Janet Redding; Susan Trentel
- Starring: Barbara Redpath; Noam Zylberman; Louise Vallance; Hadley Kay; Diane Fabian; Jazmin Lausanne; Dan Hennessey; Linda Sorensen; Len Carlson; Valri Bromfield; Sharon Noble; Jeannie Elias; Donna Christie; Blake Hauser; Danny Mann; Maurice LaMarche
- Country of origin: United States
- No. of seasons: 2
- No. of episodes: 23

Production
- Production companies: American Greetings; DIC Enterprises; The Maltese Companies

Original release
- Network: Syndication (Kideo TV)
- Release: April 5, 1986 – June 6, 1987

Popples is an animated series, based on the Popples toyline, created by Marie Cisterino, Janet Jones, Fran Kariotakis, Janet Redding, and Susan Trentel that aired in syndication in the United States from 1986 to 1987, on CITV-DT in Canada, and on Sky Channel in the United Kingdom from 1987 to 1988. The cartoon was produced by DIC Enterprises and LBS Communications in association with The Maltese Companies.

Like the toys which they are based on, the Popples resemble colorful marsupial teddy bears with long tails ending in a pom-pom and pouches on their backs that allow them to curl into a fuzzy ball. All the Popples stutter when they say words with the letter "P" in them. The name "Popple" is a reference to the popping sound they make when unfolding themselves from such a ball, or pulling objects from their pouches.

In the cartoon, Popples commonly pull large items from their pouches that could not possibly fit inside, such as elephants and pianos, which come from hammerspace; in the episode "Popples Alley", one of the Popples' human friends looks inside one of their pouches and sees numerous objects floating in a void.

== Plot ==
Nine of the Popples live with a human brother and sister, Billy and Bonnie Wagner. Billy and Bonnie think they are the only kids who have Popples until a neighbor family moves in and they have their own Popples — the Rock Stars, Pufflings, and Babies.

The Popples tend to make the kids' activities go out of hand, but with beneficial results by the end. The plot revolved around the children's efforts to hide the existence of the Popples from the adults around them, although their existence is found out by the Wagner parents in the pilot and not in the cartoons.

== Characters ==
=== Humans ===
- Bonnie Wagner (voiced by Barbara Redpath (season 1) and Valri Bromfield (season 2)) is Billy's older sister, who tries to control the chaotic situations the Popples tend to cause.
- Billy Wagner (voiced by Noam Zylberman) is Bonnie's younger brother, who does not seem bothered by the antics of the Popples.
- Ellen Wagner (voiced by Diane Fabian (season 1)) is Bonnie and Billy's mother, who remains unaware of the Popples, except in the pilot episode. Her face is usually unseen.
- Danny Wagner is Bonnie and Billy's father, also unaware of the Popples, except in the pilot episode. Appears less than his wife, and his face is usually unseen, like his wife.
- Mike (voiced by Valri Bromfield) is one of the siblings who moved next to the Wagners in the second season, along with their own Popples.
- Penny (voiced by Jeannie Elias) is Mike's sister.

=== Bonnie & Billy's Popples ===
- P.C. (Pretty Cool) (voiced by Hadley Kay (season 1) and Danny Mann (season 2)) is a large blue Popple, who serves as the co-leader of the bunch along with Party. Although he loves to have fun, he never lets things get too out of hand and is probably the most sensible member of the group. He also has a magic finger snap that can trigger all sorts of neat surprises. P.C. appeared in 40 episodes.
- Party (voiced by Louise Vallance) is a large pink Popple who is literally a party animal. She will find a reason to party any time day or night and is always pulling party hats and confetti from her pouch. Party serves as the primary Popple, as she appears in 41 of the show's 46 episodes and on the Popples logo.
- Pancake (voiced by Pauline Rennie (season 1) and Sharon Noble (season 2)) is a large dark magenta (maroon) Popple who is very sweet and affectionate. She likes to tickle Billy and Bonnie with her tail and always knows just what to do to cheer someone up. Pancake had the fewest appearances of the original nine Popples, appearing in only 10 episodes.
- Puzzle (voiced by Dan Hennessey (season 1) and Maurice LaMarche (season 2)) is a medium-sized orange Popple who is more or less the bookworm of the bunch. He enjoys reading and is quite intelligent, but he still has a great sense of humor. Puzzle is also shown to be a good swimmer. Puzzle appeared in 15 episodes.
- Prize (voiced by Louise Vallance) is a medium-sized magenta Popple who is very vain and takes great pride in her appearance. She has a small crush on PC, speaks in a Marilyn Monroe-esque voice and dreams of being a film star. Prize appeared in 15 episodes.
- Puffball (voiced by Louise Vallance) is a medium-sized white Popple who loves to throw her voice around. She is very skilled at imitating voices to trick people and Popples alike. She also hates getting her white fur dirty and tries hard to stay clean. Puffball appeared in 15 episodes.
- Putter (voiced by Len Carlson (season 1) and Danny Mann (season 2)) is a small green Popple who is somewhat hyperactive and has a tendency to do practical jokes but is very playful. Putter has a knack for fixing and inventing things, but they do not always work quite like he expects. Putter had the most appearances outside of the two lead Popples, appearing in 25 episodes.
- Potato Chip (voiced by Jazmin Lausanne (season 1) and Donna Christie (season 2)) is a small yellow Popple who loves to eat snacks. Sweet, sour or salty, Potato Chip loves them all and has quite an appetite for such a small Popple. She also has a talent for imitating sounds and sound effects. Potato Chip appeared in 18 episodes.
- Pretty Bit (voiced by Linda Sorenson (season 1) and Donna Christie (season 2)) is a small purple Popple who almost always speaks in rhyme. She is more shy than most of the Popples, but is still very loyal to her friends. She enjoys poetry and is also an expert on manners and etiquette. Pretty Bit appeared in 11 episodes.

=== Mike & Penny's Popples ===
- Punkster (voiced by Danny Mann) is one of the punk-rockstar Popples. Punkster is blue, wears a pink and yellow cape and carries an electric guitar, and has a lightning bolt on his tummy. He is regarded as a father figure for the baby Popples. He always appears with Punkity and was featured in 15 episodes.
- Punkity (voiced by Louise Vallance) is the other punk-rockstar Popple. Punkity is magenta, wears a green hair accessory and earrings and carries a microphone or tambourine, and has a star on her tummy. She is regarded as a mother figure for the baby Popples. She always appears with Punkster and was featured in 15 episodes.
- Bibsy is one of the Baby Popples. Bibsy is white and wears a purple and white bib, booties and bonnet with a star pattern. She was featured in 14 episodes.
- Cribsy is another Baby Popple. Cribsy is pink, and wears a striped white and blue hat with a matching bib and booties and even her eyelids are blue. She was featured in 14 episodes.
- Pufflings are a sub-species of smaller Popples. Pufflings are unable to speak, but communicate with others with a high-pitched warbling sound. The Pufflings like to hop and bounce around and sometimes give out joke tags that one of the Popples will read out loud. The six Pufflings have white, magenta, red, purple, blue and yellow fur.

=== Sports Popples ===
A group of six sports-themed Popples who appeared in only two episodes: "Decatha-Pop-A-Lon Popples" (in which all six appeared) and "Popple Cheer" (in which all but Cuester appeared). The only previously established character they ever make contact with is Bonnie, in the latter episode, where they explain they are "new in the neighbourhood". They are voiced by Danny Mann.

The Sports Popples each specialize in one sport, wears an outfit based on that sport, and folds into an appropriate type of ball. Even their tails are shaped like sports balls:

- Big Kick is a soccer player who turns into a soccerball.
- Cuester is a pool player who turns into an 8-ball. He appeared in the episode "Decatha-Pop-A-Lon Popples".
- Dunker is a long-limbed basketball player who turns into a basketball.
- Net Set is a tennis player who turns into a tennis ball.
- Pitcher is a baseball player who turns into a baseball.
- T.D. (Touchdown) is a player of American football who turns into a football.

== Episodes ==
Popples ran for 44 episodes, including the pilot, with two segments contained in each half-hour show. Both of the season's intros and endings are different.

=== TV film (1986) ===
Title	Original release date
Popples: The Movie	March 7, 1986
A two-reel live action film starring Brady Bluhm as Billy, Kamie Harper as Bonnie, and Nancy Lenehan and Jim Staahl as their parents. In this film, Billy and Bonnie must rescue the Popples when their parents accidentally send them to Goodwill, which follows a surprise remodel of the family's attic. This film marks the first appearance of Billy, Bonnie, their parents and the Popples.

=== Season 1 (1986) ===
No. overall	No. in season	Title	Original release date
1a	1a	"Popples Panic at the Library"	April 5, 1986
The Popples help Bonnie borrow a book from the library. This episode marks the first appearance of Bonnie, Party, P.C., Potato Chip, Puzzle and the librarian.
1b	1b	"Cooking Up a Storm"	April 5, 1986
The Popples prepare breakfast for Billy and Bonnie. This episode marks the first appearance of Billy, Putter, Pancake and Pretty Bit.
2a	2a	"Molars, Bicuspids and Popples"	April 12, 1986
Billy goes to the dentist for a check-up. This episode marks the first appearance of Prize, Billy's mom and the dentist.
2b	2b	"The Treasure of Popple Beach"	April 12, 1986
The Popples try to find the treasure of Popple Beach. This episode marks the first appearance of Puffball.
3a	3a	"Poppin' at the Car Wash"	April 19, 1986
Billy, Bonnie and the Popples visit the car wash.
3b	3b	"Springtime's a Poppin'"	April 19, 1986
The Popples help Billy and Bonnie plant a garden.
4a	4a	"Popples Play Pee Wee Golf"	April 26, 1986
Billy, Bonnie and the Popples play a game of Pee Wee Golf when they are about to get a hole in one, and get $25 to buy their mother a present.
4b	4b	"Popples Flood the Fluff 'n' Fold"	April 26, 1986
When Billy gets his mouse costume for the school play dirty, he and the Popples head to the laundrette, where the Popples cause a very big flood.
5a	5a	"Clean Sweep of Things"	May 3, 1986
Billy enlists the help of the Popples to clean up his bedroom.
5b	5b	"Poppin' Wheelies"	May 3, 1986
Billy, Bonnie and the Popples visit a roller rink to try out their skates. Eventually, the Popples decide to go skating too.
6a	6a	"Bonnie's Popple Party"	May 10, 1986
When Bonnie's birthday plans get put on hold, Billy and the Popples decide to throw their own surprise party for her.
6b	6b	"Aisles of Trouble"	May 10, 1986
When Billy and Bonnie discover that there is nothing to eat in their house, the Popples sneak off the grocery store on their own.
7a	7a	"Popples' Paint Party"	May 17, 1986
Billy is making a science project at school and the Popples are helping him too. Meanwhile, Prize turns into a statue.
7b	7b	"Pop-Paring for Bed"	May 17, 1986
When the Popples decide to help Billy and Bonnie get ready for bed, they accidentally make a mess of the bathroom. Luckily, Puffball is there to help sort it out, with a ukulele.
8a	8a	"Poppolympics"	May 24, 1986
While Billy and Bonnie are away at the Junior Olympics, the Popples decide to hold their own annual Poppolympics, and despite not having a gold medal like the others, Pretty Bit is determined to win it. This is the first episode with all the Popples.
8b	8b	"Sports Shop Pop"	May 24, 1986
The Popples follow Billy and Bonnie to a sports shop where they try out different sports.
9a	9a	"Takin' Out the Trash"	May 31, 1986
The Popples try several plans to help Billy take out the trash, but with each plan the mess seems to get even worse.
9b	9b	"A Hair Raising Experience"	May 31, 1986
The Popples cause mayhem at the hairdressers.
10a	10a	"Pop Goes the Radio"	June 7, 1986
Going head to head with Tommy, Billy enters his plane into a plane flying competition, with Putter riding on it.
10b	10b	"Poppin' Pillow Talk"	June 7, 1986
Bonnie, Party, Potato Chip and Prize have a pillow talk. Meanwhile, Billy and P.C. have other plans to stop them.
11a	11a	"Popples' Alley"	June 14, 1986
Billy and Bonnie are at a bowling alley, with the Popples causing mayhem at every turn.
11b	11b	"Where the Pop Flies"	June 14, 1986
It is the day of the baseball game, and Billy is about to hit the home run, but not with the Popples, because they will ruin the game.
12a	12a	"Hooray for Hollywood Popples!"	June 21, 1986
Billy and Bonnie visit the movie studios in Hollywood. Meanwhile, the Popples tag along and decide to make their own movie.
12b	12b	"Backyard Bigtop"	June 21, 1986
When Billy and Bonnie are feeling sick and cannot go to the circus, the Popples decide to put on their own circus performance for them. This is the second episode with all the Popples.
13a	13a	"Backyard Adventure"	June 28, 1986
Billy, Bonnie and the Popples go camping together, but when the wind tries to blow their tent, the Popples have to build a brick wall to stop the wind blowing the tent.
13b	13b	"Poppin' at the Drive In"	June 28, 1986
Billy, Bonnie and the Popples go to a drive-in cinema, where the Popples cause much fun on the big screen.

=== Season 2 (1987) ===
No. overall	No. in season	Title	Written by	Original release date
14a	1a	"Popplin' Around the Block"	Jack Hanrahan and Eleanor Burian-Mohr	April 4, 1987
The Popples give their new friends a tour around the block and discover new things.
14b	1b	"Moving Day"	Jack Hanrahan and Eleanor Burian-Mohr	April 4, 1987
Billy and Bonnie meet their new neighbors and friends, Mike and Penny. Meanwhile, all the Popples meet Mike and Penny's Popples and hold a party at their house. This episode marks the first appearance of Mike, Penny, Punkster, Punkity, Bibsy, Cribsy and the Pufflings and the last appearance of Pancake. This episode is also the season premiere.
15a	2a	"Treehouse Capers"	Jack Hanrahan and Eleanor Burian-Mohr	April 11, 1987
When Billy, Bonnie, Mike and Penny have an argument while building their treehouse, the Popples help build it themselves.
15b	2b	"No Bizness Like Popple Bizness"	Jack Hanrahan and Eleanor Burian-Mohr	April 11, 1987
While the kids are away, the Popples decide to make a video for them.
16a	3a	"Museum Peace"	George Edwards	April 18, 1987
Billy and Bonnie decide to go to the museum, only to find it closed. Meanwhile, inside the museum, the Popples decide to have fun around the exhibitions.
16b	3b	"Lemonade Stand-Off"	Bob Logan	April 18, 1987
Billy and Mike set up a lemonade stand, but no one comes to buy any. Meanwhile, the Popples try to help them.
17a	4a	"Popple Post Office"	Bob Logan	April 25, 1987
Billy and Bonnie take a letter to the post office, but the Popples are too cheeky to join in as well.
17b	4b	"Funhouse Folly"	George Edwards	April 25, 1987
Billy and Bonnie decide to go to an indoor play center, only to find it closed. Meanwhile, the Popples take the fun in the hall of mirrors and lots of other fun things.
18a	5a	"Fixer Upper Popples"	Jack Hanrahan and Eleanor Burian-Mohr	May 2, 1987
The Popples try to fix things, but the things they try don't go too well.
18b	5b	"Rock Around the Popples"	Jack Hanrahan and Eleanor Burian-Mohr	May 2, 1987
Mike takes his tuba to a music store, when, out of the blue, the Popples join him too.
19a	6a	"The College of Popple Knowledge"	Jack Hanrahan and Eleanor Burian-Mohr	May 9, 1987
When Penny meets Bonnie on their bikes, ready to head off to school, Bibsy and Cribsy express their desire to go with them, only to be told by Bonnie that they are too young to go to school. Luckily, the other Popples decide to play school with Bibsy and Cribsy, starting with Puzzle for maths.
19b	6b	"Popple Cheer"	Jody Miles Conner	May 9, 1987
Bonnie is on cheerleading duty, when, out of the blue, the Sports Popples are there to give her a hand. This episode marks the first appearance of the Sports Popples, but this episode only features T.D., Big Kick, Dunker, Net Set and Pitcher.
20a	7a	"Barn Hoopla"	Jody Miles Conner	May 16, 1987
Bonnie visits her grandparents' farm. Meanwhile, the Popples have fun, causing madness and mayhem at every turn. This episode marks the last appearance of Prize.
20b	7b	"The Jellybean Jamboree"	Jody Miles Conner	May 16, 1987
Billy and Mike go on a school field trip to a candy factory, while the Popples come along with them. This episode marks the last appearance of Billy.
21a	8a	"Private Eye Popples"	Jack Hanrahan and Eleanor Burian-Mohr	May 23, 1987
The Popples pretend to be detectives and get up to mischief until Mike and Penny return.
21b	8b	"The Repair Shop"	Jody Miles Conner	May 23, 1987
Bonnie takes her doll to the repair shop, with the Popples visiting as well. This episode marks the last appearance of Puffball and Potato Chip.
22a	9a	"Decatha-Pop-a-Lon Popples"	Jack Hanrahan and Eleanor Burian-Mohr	May 30, 1987
The Sports Popples hold their very own sporting events. This marks the only appearance of Cuester, since he was the only Sports Popple left and the last appearance of the Sports Popples.
22b	9b	"Cuckoo Choo Choo"	Jack Hanrahan and Eleanor Burian-Mohr	May 30, 1987
The Popples make their own train station. This marks the last appearance of Mike and Putter.
23a	10a	"The Popple Fashion Parade"	Jody Miles Conner	June 6, 1987
Bonnie and the Popples put on a fashion parade. The next day, Penny tells Bonnie she is having too much fun with the Popples. This marks the last appearance of Bonnie and Pretty Bit.
23b	10b	"Poppin' at the Zoo"	Jody Miles Conner	June 6, 1987
Penny and the Popples visit the zoo. The Popples have a lot of fun, causing madness and mayhem at every turn, meeting the animals and playing. This marks the last appearance of Penny, Party, P.C., Puzzle, Punkster, Punkitty, Bibsy, Cribsy and the Pufflings. This is also the final episode of the series.

== Release ==
=== Home media ===
A single-disc DVD of the series was released in the UK by Maximum Entertainment in 2004, containing 10 segments.

=== Streaming ===
As of 2020, the series can be found on Pluto TV and on demand on Paramount+.

=== International broadcast ===
- Sky Channel (1987–1988, UK)
- CITV (1986-1987, Canada)

==== UK VHS history ====
- Tempo Video (1987–1988)

UK VHS releases
VHS title	VHS studios	Release date	Episodes	Notes
Popples – Popples Panic At The Library	Tempo Video (MSD Video)	1987	Popples Panic At The Library, Cookin' Up A Storm, Molars Bicuspids and Popples, The Tresure Of Popple Beach	
Popples – Popples Play Pee Wee Golf	Tempo Video (MSD Video)	1988	Popples Play Pee Wee Golf, Popples Flood the Fluff 'n' Fold, Clean Sweep of Things, Poppin' Wheelies	
Children's Cartoon Favourites	Tempo Video (MSD Video)	1988	Popples Panic At The Library, Popple Flood The Fluff 'n' Fold (compilation VHS with Care Bears and Sylvanian Families)	
Popples – Popples Panic At The Library and Cookin' Up A Storm	Tempo Video (MSD Video)	1988	Popples Panic At The Library, Cookin' Up A Storm	
Popples Partytime	Tempo Video (MSD Video)	1988	A Clean Sweep Of Things, Poppin' Wheelies, Bonnie's Popple Party, Aisles Of Trouble	

== Other media ==
The Popples also had a comic book series from Star Comics (an imprint of Marvel Comics).

A new series based on the characters premiered in 2015.

== See also ==
- Care Bears
- Paw Paws
- The Wuzzles
- My Little Pony
