= Adam Rich =

American actor (1968–2023)

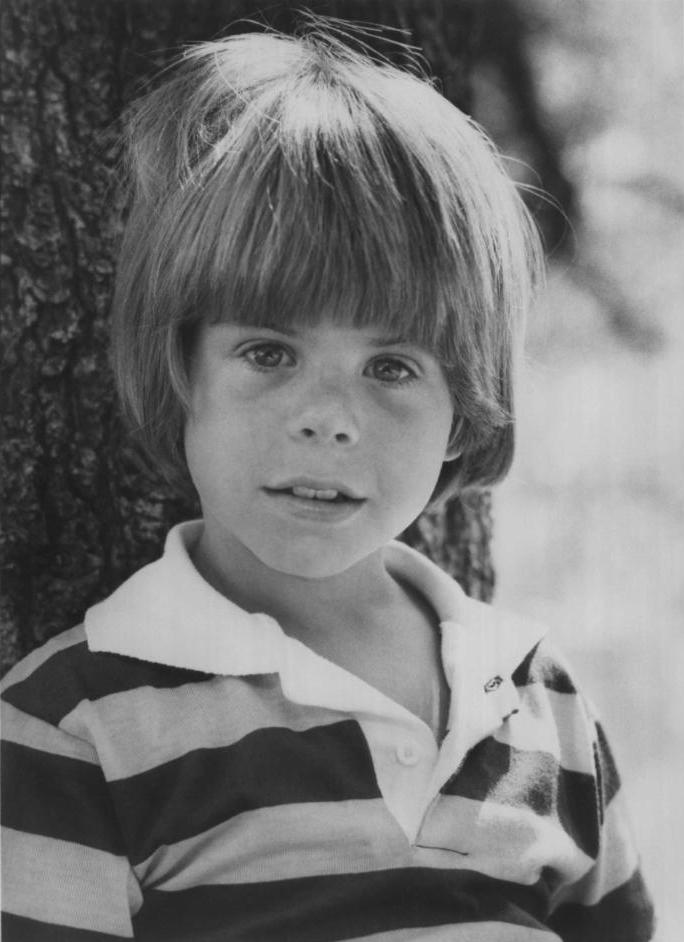
- Rich in 1977
- Born: October 12, 1968; New York City, New York, U.S.
- Died: January 7, 2023 (aged 54); Los Angeles, California, U.S.
- Occupation: Actor
- Years active: 1976–2003
- Known for: Eight Is Enough; Dungeons & Dragons

Adam Rich (October 12, 1968 – January 7, 2023) was an American actor. He was best known for his portrayal of Nicholas Bradford, the youngest son on the television series Eight Is Enough, which ran for five seasons (1977–1981). Known for his pageboy haircut, Rich's character on the show led him to be known as "America's little brother".

== Personal life ==
Rich was born on October 12, 1968, the son of Francine and Rob Rich. His family was Jewish. Growing up as a child actor, Rich lived in Granada Hills, Los Angeles, with his parents and younger brother. The family briefly lived in Florida where he learned how to act at the local gym. He was active in sports, including baseball, football, bicycle riding, skateboarding, and swimming. He also had an interest in drawing. At age 14, he tried smoking marijuana, and at 17, in 1986, he dropped out of high school. He almost died of a valium overdose in 1989. On April 16, 1991, he was arrested after a shoplifting spree at a pharmacy and a Bullock’s department store in Northridge, Los Angeles. He was released, with his television father Dick Van Patten paying his bail.

In 1996, there was a media hoax that Rich had been murdered; the story was published in the San Francisco-based magazine Might, with Rich's consent.

In 2002, Rich was arrested for driving under the influence (DUI). Rich had publicly discussed his experiences with depression and substance abuse in the months before he died and had a history of many drug rehabilitation stints and several overdoses. He tweeted in October 2022 that he had been sober for seven years after arrests. He urged his followers never to give up.

== Career ==
Rich was cast in the role of Nicholas on Eight is Enough at the age of eight. After Eight Is Enough, he had roles in Irwin Allen's short-lived 1981 TV series Code Red on ABC and the 1983 sitcom Gun Shy on CBS.

Rich made guest appearances on television series including The Love Boat, CHiPs, Silver Spoons, Fantasy Island, The Six Million Dollar Man, St. Elsewhere, and Baywatch. He also did voice work on the cartoon series Dungeons & Dragons, along with Eight Is Enough co-star Willie Aames.

Rich appeared in television commercials for Betty Crocker Snackin' Cake and Nabisco's Wheatsworth crackers.

== Death ==
Rich died at his Los Angeles home on January 7, 2023, at the age of 54. The Los Angeles County Medical Examiner's autopsy report indicates Rich died from a fentanyl overdose.

== Filmography ==
| Year | Title | Role | Notes |
|---|---|---|---|
| 1976 | The Six Million Dollar Man | Bob | Episode: "A Bionic Christmas Carol" |
| 1977 | The City | Donnie Collins | Television film |
| 1977–81 | Eight Is Enough | Nicholas Bradford | Main cast (112 episodes) |
| 1978 | Fantasy Island | Herbie Block | Episode: "Instant Family" |
| 1979 | The Love Boat | Brian Phillips | Episode: "Oldies But Goodies" |
| 1979 | CHiPs | Himself | Episode: "Roller Disco: Part 2" |
| 1979 | Tukiki and His Search for a Merry Christmas | Tukiki (voice) | Television special |
| 1980 | 3-2-1 Contact | Nicholas Bradford | Episode: "Crowded/Uncrowded: Human Crowding" |
| 1981 | The Devil and Max Devlin | Toby Hart | Feature film |
| 1981–82 | Code Red | Danny Blake | Main cast (13 episodes) |
| 1982 | CBS Children's Mystery Theatre | Jeffrey Brenner | Episode: "The Zertigo Diamond Caper" |
| 1982 | Fantasy Island | Huck Finn | Episode: "Natchez Bound" |
| 1982 | CHiPs | Louis Hindall | Episode: "Fallout" |
| 1983 | Gun Shy | Clovis | Episodes: "Reading, Writing and Robbing", "Mail Order Mommy" |
| 1983–85 | Dungeons & Dragons | Presto, the Magician | Voice role (27 episodes) |
| 1986 | St. Elsewhere | Louis Appleton | Episode: "Family Affair" |
| 1986 | Small Wonder | Peter Watson | Episode: "Chewed Out" |
| 1986 | Silver Spoons | Scott | Episode: "Rick Moves Out" |
| 1987 | Eight Is Enough: A Family Reunion | Nicholas Bradford | Television film |
| 1988 | Small Wonder | The Beast | Episode: "The Gang's All Here" |
| 1989 | An Eight Is Enough Wedding | Nicholas Bradford | Television film |
| 1993 | Baywatch | Ethan | Episode: "Sky Rider" |
| 2003 | Dickie Roberts: Former Child Star | Himself (cameo) | Feature film (final role) |
