= Michael Magee (actor) =

Canadian actor (1929–2011)

- Born: October 11, 1929
- Died: July 15, 2011 (aged 81)
- Occupations: Actor; singer; author
- Television: The Real Magees
- Relatives: E.P. Taylor (nephew)

Michael Magee (October 11, 1929 – July 15, 2011) was a Canadian actor, singer and author. He was known for voicing Cyril Sneer and his pet half dog/half aardvark Snag in the Canadian animated series The Raccoons and the voice for The Coach on the CBC show, Yes You Can.

== Career ==
Magee was the nephew of industrialist and racehorse stable owner E.P. Taylor, and was a regular at racetracks from the time he was a teenager. He spent time as a janitor, a surveyor, a hotel desk clerk, and a fish-cannery line-worker before he began his radio career at CKNW in Vancouver in 1956. He also spent time as a stage actor, but noted “You starve acting, and you need money to go to the races.” He became a writer, producer, and commentator for the CBC in 1964.

In 1973, he created the show The Real Magees, where he and his wife Duddie were the hosts of this weekday, half-hour talk show, chatting informally with non-celebrities, such as a cab driver, ambulance driver and nightclub bouncer. Bob Weinstein produced the series in Montreal for Screen Gems and CBC Television.

Magee also became well known for his alter-ego that he created in the late 1960s, Fred C. Dobbs. Dobbs was a wild-haired, cigar-smoking, opinionated, retirement-aged farmer from Beamsville, Ontario, with no filter and who fancied himself as a champion of the average working man. He first came to the public's attention when a daily telephone call from a crotchety commentator enlivened Bruno Gerussi's morning show on CBC Radio in the late 1960s and early 1970s. Magee based Dobbs on "All the old 'lobby generals'" he had encountered in his time at various racetracks; the name "Fred C. Dobbs" was taken from the lead character of The Treasure of the Sierra Madre. By 1969, Magee-as-Dobbs had appeared on CBC Television in sketches alongside Don Harron, who played a somewhat similar (albeit gentler) character -- opinionated, malaprop-spouting Parry Sound farmer Charlie Farquharson.

In the mid-to-late 1970s, Magee starred in a series for Toronto's TVOntario called Magee & Company, in which he was the only cast member and played numerous characters, including Dobbs. Around this time, Dobbs was also heard in a series of syndicated radio commentaries, distributed nationally in Canada. A unrestrained malcontent who humorously railed against almost everything in the modern world (and Canadian politics in particular), Dobbs proved popular enough that Magee wrote two books of commentary that were written in character and credited to Dobbs: The Golden Age of B.S. (1976), and The Platinum Age of B.S. (1981).

Magee began voicing the villainous Cyril Sneer on the animated series The Raccoons in 1980, a role which continued through various specials into the early 1990s.

Magee also worked as a writer, producer, and commentator for the CBC racing telecasts through 1986. The network won the Sovereign Award for outstanding film/video/broadcast in 1985. An avid racing historian, Magee authored the book, "Champions," in collaboration with Pat Bayes, which was published in 1980. He also was a renowned handicapper and one of his last official connections with racing was as the host of "Racing with Magee", a daily radio show that aired in the mid-1990s.

== Death ==
Magee died on July 15, 2011 at the age of 81. He had been suffering from colitis, which led to internal bleeding and heart stoppage.

== Filmography ==
Year	Title	Role	Notes
1972	The Merry Wives of Tobias Rouke	Narrator	
1976	The Clown Murders	Compton	
1979	The Brood	Inspector	
1980	The Christmas Raccoons	Cyril Sneer	Voice, TV movie
1981	The Raccoons on Ice	Cyril Sneer / Snag	Voice, TV movie
1983	The Raccoons and the Lost Star	Cyril Sneer / Snag	Voice, TV movie
1984	The Raccoons: Let's Dance!	Cyril Sneer / Snag	Voice, TV movie
1984	The Surrogate	Motorcycle Cop	
1985–1991	The Raccoons	Cyril Sneer / Snag	Voice, TV Series
