= The Real Magees =

- Genre: Talk show
- Country of origin: Canada
- Original language: English
- No. of seasons: 1

Production
- Producer: Bob Weinstein
- Production location: Montreal
- Running time: 30 minutes
- Production companies: CBC; Screen Gems

Original release
- Network: CBC Television
- Release: 22 May – 14 September 1973

The Real Magees is a Canadian talk show that aired on CBC Television in 1973.

== Premise ==
This mid-season talk show was hosted by married couple Michael and Duddie Magee. They interviewed an ambulance driver, a taxi driver and other people who were not widely known. It was co-produced by the CBC and Screen Gems.

== Scheduling ==
The half-hour program aired on weekdays at 1:30 p.m. from 22 May to 14 September 1973.
