= Marvin Goldhar =

- Born: April 29, 1933; Ontario, Canada
- Died: March 31, 2002 (aged 68); Toronto, Ontario, Canada
- Resting place: Pardes Shalom Cemetery, Vaughan, Ontario, Canada
- Occupations: Actor, voice artist
- Years active: 1963–2002
- Children: Jeff, Randi

Marvin Goldhar (April 29, 1933 – March 31, 2002) was a Canadian actor, best known for his voice work in animated programs and in made-for-TV movies.

Among his voice credits include Cedric Sneer on The Raccoons, Mr. Weatherbee on The New Archies and Bronto Thunder and Bonehead in Dinosaucers.

He has also done voices for television and films including Star Wars: Ewoks, Star Wars: Droids, Garbage Pail Kids, AlfTales, The Nutcracker Prince, Babar, Highlander: The Animated Series, Maxie's World, Beverly Hills Teens, The Care Bears, Rupert, C.O.P.S., Overdrawn at the Memory Bank, ALF: The Animated Series, Sylvanian Families, Starcom, Police Academy, WildC.A.T.s, The Magic School Bus, Little Rosey, The Busy World of Richard Scarry, Dog City, A Cosmic Christmas and My Pet Monster.

Goldhar also played roles in live-action such as Mogul in Mafia Princess, Gareth Williamson in Night Heat, Grandpa Maurice in The Zack Files, Ron Morrow in Hot Money, Detective #1 in A Deadly Business, Larry Sr. in Big Deal, Burt Horowitz in Deadline, Phil King in The Last Polka, Harry in Club Land as well as a guest star on Saturday Night Live. Marv played the rabbi in the famous SNL mock commercial "Royal Deluxe II" where the rabbi performs a circumcision in the back of the smooth driving car - which appeared in the very first episode of Saturday Night Live in 1975.

He died in Toronto, Ontario in 2002.

His son, Jeff Goldhar, currently works as a director/producer for CBC Television.

== Partial filmography ==
- The Offering (1966) - Jack
- My Pleasure Is My Business (1975) - All the detectives
- Running (1979) - Maloney
- Deadline (1980) - Burt Horowitz
- Hot Money (1983) - Ron Morrow
- Big Deal (1985) - Larry Sr.
- The Raccoons (1985–1991) - Cedric Sneer / Henri de la Possum / Herman Zechariah Stroll / Sid Leech / J.P. Gordon
- The Legend of Zelda (1989) - Sleazenose / Doof
- The Nutcracker Prince (1990) - Mr. Schaeffer / Mouse / Guest #3 / First Guard / Soldier / Band Member #1 / Contestant / Spectator (voice)
