= Monster by Mistake =

- Created by: Mark Mayerson
- Voices of: Julie Lemieux; Hillary Cooper; Sally Cahill; Tony Rosato; Daniel DeSanto; Len Carlson; Howard Jerome; Jayne Eastwood; Megan Fahlenbock; Barbara Franklin; Susan Roman
- Theme music composer: Bruce Fowler; Blair Packham
- Composers: Bruce Fowler; Modular Music
- Country of origin: Canada
- No. of seasons: 3
- No. of episodes: 51

Production
- Executive producers: Kim Davidson; Arnie Zipursky; Annette Frymer (S3)
- Producers: Hasmi Giakoumis (S1); Julie Stall (S1-2); Mark Mayerson (S3); Kristine Klohk (S3)
- Running time: 22 minutes
- Production companies: Catapult Productions; Cambium Entertainment (seasons 1–2); CCI Entertainment (season 3)

Original release
- Network: YTV; VRAK.TV (season 3)
- Release: September 18, 1999 – March 23, 2003

Monster by Mistake is a Canadian animated television series that aired on YTV from September 18, 1999 to March 23, 2003 after airing its pilot on October 26, 1996. The show features Warren; an 8 year old boy who is accidentally mixed up in a magic spell, which turns him into a large blue monster every time he sneezes.

The series was created by Mark Mayerson of Catapult Productions, and co-produced with CCI Entertainment (formerly Cambium) in Toronto, Canada. The two companies partnered in Studio 345, a computer animation and former Sears catalogue production facility for the production of the show, which was made using Houdini software. It was one of the earliest TV shows to be entirely computer-animated. The series also aired on Disney Channel in the UK.

== Characters ==
- Warren Patterson (voiced by Julie Lemieux in the series and voiced by Corey Sevier in the pilot episode) is the protagonist of the show, an 8 year old boy who turns into the titular blue sasquatch-like monster whenever he sneezes after being accidentally cursed by Gorgool's jewel.
- Tracy Patterson (voiced by Hillary Cooper) is Warren's supportive older sister who practices witchcraft after receiving Gorgool's book.
- Johnny B. Dead (voiced by William Colgate) is a wise-cracking, trumpet-playing ghost who assists the siblings in their misadventures and secretly lives in the Pattersons' attic.

=== Recurring characters ===
- Roz and Tom Patterson (voiced by Sally Cahill and Tony Rosato) are the parents of Warren and Tracy. Tom works as a bus driver.
- Aunt Dolores (voiced by Jayne Eastwood) is Warren and Tracy's aunt, a crabby and stuck-up but serious and well-meaning police officer and the older sister of Tom Patterson. She has a vendetta against the monster, unaware of it being her nephew.
- Billy Castleman (voiced by Daniel DeSanto) is an overweight, mean school bully who often ridicules Warren. He intends to prove Warren as the monster, but is unable to do so.
- Gorgool (voiced by Len Carlson) is a sorcerer and the would-be ruler of Fenrath, who is trapped in a ball. He intends to steal the Jewel of Fenrath and the Book of Spells to free himself from the ball.
- The Servant (voiced by Howard Jerome) is the dim-witted servant of Gorgool.
- Wesley Whiffington III (voiced by Christopher Ralph) is a child who appears in the second season. He is spoiled and never gets things his way. He is also interested in adult projects such as business and moviemaking.
- Miranda Bell (voiced by Alyson Court) is a girl who said she became a scientist at age six and says that her brain weighs eight pounds.
- Morgool (voiced by Len Carlson) is Gorgool's twin brother and the ruler of Fenrath. He is not trapped within a ball and is far more dangerous and evil than his twin.
- Ms. Gish (voiced by Barbara Franklin) is a teacher.
- Kragon (voiced by George Buza) is a guard from Gorem Range who works for Morgool.
- Red (voiced by Megan Fahlenbock) is an orphan from Fenrath who befriends Warren and Tracy.
- Freddie Mitchell and Connor (both voiced by Susan Roman) are friends of Warren's. Freddie loves to tell jokes and play soccer. Connor's hobbies include pogo jumping, playing the piano, and video games.
- Keebo (voiced by Hadley Kay) is a shapeshifting creature from Fenrath.
- Dr. Malarmar (voiced by Adrian Truss) is a criminal and master thief who loves to dress up to fool people.
- Dr. Fossel (voice by Michael Fawkes) is an archeologist and historian who works at the Pickford museum.

== Episodes ==
The first episode aired on October 26, 1996, and the last episode aired on March 23, 2003. 52 episodes were produced over three seasons.

=== Pilot (1996) ===
No.	Title	Directed by	Written by	Original release date
0	"The Jewel of Fenrath"	Mark Mayerson	Mark Mayerson and Kim Davidson	October 26, 1996

=== Season 1 (1999) ===
No.	Title	Directed by	Written by	Original release date
1	"Fossel Remains"	Harry Rasmussen	Deborah Jarvis	September 18, 1999
2	"Haunted House"	Robert D.M. Smith	Anita Kapila	September 25, 1999
3	"Pizza Day"	Robert D.M. Smith	Deborah Jarvis	October 2, 1999
4	"Just Desserts"	Mark Mayerson	Lawrence S. Mirkin	October 9, 1999
5	"Monster Mayhem"	Mark Mayerson	Deborah Jarvis	October 16, 1999
6	"Special Talent"	Harry Rasmussen	Lawrence S. Mirkin	October 23, 1999
7	"Campsite Creeper"	Robert D.M. Smith	Dan Fill	October 30, 1999
8	"Home Alone"	Mark Mayerson	Deborah Jarvis and Anita Kapila	November 6, 1999
9	"Entertaining Orville"	Harry Rasmussen	Cathy Moss	November 13, 1999
10	"Kidnapped"	Robert D.M. Smith	Anita Kapila	November 20, 1999
11	"Monster A-Go-Go"	Mark Mayerson	Deborah Jarvis	November 27, 1999
12	"Back in Time"	Harry Rasmussen	Lawrence S. Mirkin	December 4, 1999
13	"Gwynneth"	Robert D.M. Smith	Deborah Jarvis	December 11, 1999

=== Season 2 (2000) ===
No.	Title	Directed by	Written by	Original release date
14	"Billy Caves In"	Brian Harris	Anita Kapila	September 4, 2000
15	"Tracy's Jacket"	Robert D.M. Smith	Deborah Jarvis	September 11, 2000
16	"Live from Pickford"	Harry Rasmussen	Steve Westren	September 18, 2000
17	"Soap Box Derby"	Brian Harris	Stephen Ashton	September 25, 2000
18	"The Big Dig"	Robert D.M. Smith	Dan Fill	October 2, 2000
19	"Thin Ice"	Harry Rasmussen	Anita Kapila	October 9, 2000
20	"Gorgool's Pet"	Brian Harris	Steve Wright	October 16, 2000
21	"Jungleland"	Robert D.M. Smith	Cathy Moss	October 23, 2000
22	"Cops and Monsters"	Harry Rasmussen	Mark Mayerson	October 30, 2000
23	"Johnny's Reunion"	Brian Harris	Anita Kapila	November 6, 2000
24	"Moving Day"	Mark Mayerson	Mark Mayerson	November 13, 2000
25	"Lights! Camera! Monster!"	Robert D.M. Smith	Deborah Jarvis	November 20, 2000

=== Season 3 (2003) ===
No.	Title	Directed by	Written by	Original release date
26	"Warren's Nightmare"	Mark Mayerson	Mark Mayerson	February 26, 2003
27	"Wrestling Challenge"	David Geldart	Story by : Mark Mayerson; Teleplay by : Steve Westren	February 27, 2003
28	"Monkey in the Middle"	Troy Sullivan	Nicole Demerse	February 28, 2003
29	"Watch the Birdie"	Mark Mayerson	Mark Mayerson	March 1, 2003
30	"Natural Disaster"	David Geldart	Patrick Granleese	March 2, 2003
31	"Donut Dough"	Troy Sullivan	Steve Westren	March 3, 2003
32	"Robo Fuzz"	Mark Mayerson	Terry Saltsman	March 4, 2003
33	"Dino Might"	David Geldart	Dennise Fordham	March 5, 2003
34	"Ghost with the Most"	Troy Sullivan	Anita Kapila	March 6, 2003
35	"Reduce, Re-use, Recycle... Run!"	Mark Mayerson	Patrick Granleese	March 7, 2003
36	"Night of the Living Meat"	David Geldart	Steve Westren	March 8, 2003
37	"Badgering Billy"	Troy Sullivan	Steve Westren	March 9, 2003
38	"Monster on Purpose"	Mark Mayerson	Patrick Granleese	March 10, 2003
39	"Duel for a Jewel"	David Geldart	Stew Mulligan	March 11, 2003
40	"Keebo for Keeps"	Mark Mayerson	Bruce Robb	March 12, 2003
41	"Who's Who"	Troy Sullivan	Patrick Granleese	March 13, 2003
42	"Knight and Day"	David Geldart	Terry Saltsman	March 14, 2003
43	"Sasquashed"	Troy Sullivan	Dennise Fordham	March 15, 2003
44	"Mine Your Own Business"	Mark Mayerson	Mark Mayerson and Bruce Robb	March 16, 2003
45	"Leap Frog"	David Geldart	Patrick Granleese	March 17, 2003
46	"Lucky Break"	Troy Sullivan	Terry Saltsman	March 18, 2003
47	"Worlds Collide"	Mark Mayerson	Terry Saltsman	March 19, 2003
48	"Lights Out"	David Geldart	Dennise Fordham and Patrick Granleese	March 20, 2003
49	"Curse of the Invisible Man"	Troy Sullivan	Patrick Granleese	March 21, 2003
50	"Brotherly Hate"	Mark Mayerson	Mark Mayerson and Terry Saltsman	March 22, 2003
51	"Strawberry Jam"	David Geldart	Steve Westren	March 23, 2003

== Notes ==
- Prior to the series being made, the pilot episode aired as a yearly Halloween special from 1996 to 1999.

== Home media ==
Several episodes of the series have been released by Genius Products on DVD, with each containing two episodes:

- Disc one: "Monster on Purpose" and "Monster by Mistake" (titled as "The Jewel of Fenrath")
- Disc two: "Badgering Billy" and "Haunted House"
- Disc three: "Sasquashed" and "Campsite Creeper"

Several VHS tapes of the series were released by Winding Stair Press in 2000:

- "Monster By Mistake" and "Entertaining Orville"
- "Home Alone" and "Monster a Go-Go"
- "Fossil Remains" and "Kidnapped"
- "Gorgool's Pet" and "Jungleland"
