= Len Carlson =

Canadian voice actor (1937–2006)

- Born: September 2, 1937; Edmonton, Alberta, Canada
- Died: January 26, 2006 (aged 68); Keswick, Ontario, Canada
- Occupation: Voice actor
- Years active: 1964–2006

Len Carlson (September 2, 1937 – January 26, 2006) was a Canadian voice actor who voiced various characters on many animated television series from the 1960s to the 2000s, an occasional live-action TV actor, and a Kraft Canada TV pitchman during the 1970s and 1980s. He was a native of Edmonton and a former professional athlete, playing baseball for a San Francisco Giants farm team before his acting career.

== Career ==
He was the voice of Big Boss, Sundown and Mace on C.O.P.S., Senator Robert Kelly and the Supreme Intelligence on X-Men (1992), Bert Raccoon and Pigs Two and Three in The Raccoons (and a voice director for the show from 1990 to 1991), Putter from Popples, Mr. Frumble, Mr. Gronkle, and Mayor Fox in The Busy World of Richard Scarry, Professor Coldheart in Care Bears (1985), and Rocket Robin Hood in some of the third-season episodes. He was also the voice of Allo and Quackpot on the TV series, Dinosaucers and he was the original voice of the Green Goblin in Spider-Man (1967), the voice of Ganon in The Legend of Zelda segments of The Super Mario Bros. Super Show!, and the voice of Buzz in the show Cyberchase (2002). Also, he was the voice of Sterling Überbucks, his brother Carling, his great grandfather Sterling Überrucks and his nephew Stewie on RoboRoach (2002) and the title character in the short-lived Swamp Thing (1991) animated series.

He also voiced all the male characters in two animated 1970s series (The Undersea Adventures of Captain Nemo and The Toothbrush Family), was the voice of Ace the Seagull and Sharkey Shark in the children's TV series The Waterville Gang and did voices for movies including The Nutcracker Prince, Care Bears: Journey to Joke-a-lot, The Great Defender of Fun, and reindeer voices in the live-action feature Blizzard.

In addition to numerous contributions to animated television, Carlson was the voice of Kraft Canada advertisements for decades, as well as being the voice of the Jolly Green Giant, Canadian Tire, Kelloggs, and more. Carlson also contributed to creative projects, dramatically opening Canadian musician Lawrence Gowan's 1985 music video "A Criminal Mind".

In his last years, Carlson was a regular on Nelvana-produced shows such as Rolie Polie Olie, Cyberchase, Pecola, Donkey Kong Country, Medabots, Beetlejuice, and Beyblade as the main antagonist Gideon (season two).

== Death ==
Carlson died of a heart attack in Keswick, Ontario, at the age of 68 on January 26, 2006. The Atomic Betty episode "Takes One to Know One", the Cyberchase episode "EcoHaven Ooze", and the Bigfoot Presents: Meteor and the Mighty Monster Trucks episode "Space Rangers" were dedicated to his memory.

== Filmography ==
Year	Title	Role	Notes
1966	The Marvel Super Heroes	Loki, Odin	
1967–1969	Spider-Man	Green Goblin, Additional voices	
1975	The Undersea Adventures of Captain Nemo	Captain Mark Nemo, Dr. MacPherson	
1977	The Toothbrush Family	Tom, Toby, Gramps, Additional voices	
1980	The Christmas Raccoons	Bert Raccoon	
1981	The Raccoons on Ice	Bert Raccoon	
1981	The Trolls and the Christmas Express	Additional voices	
1983	The Raccoons and the Lost Star	Bert Raccoon, Pig General	
1984	The Raccoons: Let's Dance!	Bert Raccoon	
1985	Care Bears	Professor Coldheart, Strato Nefarious	DIC version
1985–1986	Jayce and the Wheeled Warriors	Herc Stormsailor	
1985–1991	The Raccoons	Bert Raccoon, additional voices	
1987	Dinosaucers	Allo, Quackpot	
1987	Sylvanian Families	Packbat, Wade Waters, Cliff Babblebrook, Rocky Babblebrook	
1987–1989	ALF: The Animated Series	Colonel Cantfayl, Sargent Staff	
1988–1989	C.O.P.S.	Brandon 'Big Boss' Babel, Sgt. Colt 'Mace' Howard, Walker 'Sundown' Calhoun	
1988–1989	Police Academy	Captain Harris, Additional voices	
1989	The Legend of Zelda	Ganon, Moblins	
1989–1991	Beetlejuice	The Monster Across the Street, Additional voices	
1990–1991	Swamp Thing	Swamp Thing	
1990	The Nutcracker Prince	King, Mouse, Court Attendant, Band Member #2, Spectator, Soldier	
1992–1996	X-Men: The Animated Series	Senator Robert Kelly, additional voices	
1994–1996	The Busy World of Richard Scarry	Mr. Frumble, Mr. Gronkle, Mayor Fox, additional voices	
1995–1996	The Neverending Story	Vermin, various voices	
1996–2003	Monster by Mistake	Gorgool, Morgool	
1997–1999	The Mr. Men Show	Additional voices	US version
1997–2000	Donkey Kong Country	Krusha	
1998	Pippi Longstocking	Thunder-Karlsson	
1998–2004	Rolie Polie Olie	Pappy Polie, Additional voices	
1998–2000	Flying Rhino Junior High	Principal Mulligan	
1999	Street Fighter III: 3rd Strike	Hugo, Q	
1999	New Tales from the Cryptkeeper	Injun Joe, Visiting Leader	
2000–2001	Corduroy	Buckaroo	
2001–2002	Pecola	Officer Kumada	English version
2002	Rolie Polie Olie: The Great Defender of Fun	Pappy Polie, TV Announcer	
2002–2003	Beyblade V-Force	Gideon	
2002–2007	Cyberchase	Buzz (seasons 1-5)	
2003	Blizzard	Additional reindeer voices	
2004	Care Bears: Journey to Joke-a-lot	Philo	
2004–2006	KidsWorld Sports	PAL	
2004–2006	Atomic Betty	Minimus P.U., Greenbeard, B-1, Spindly Tam Kanushu (seasons 1 and 2)	
2005	Time Warp Trio	Grim	Episode: "Viking It and Liking It"
2006	Captain Flamingo	Various voices	Posthumous release; Final role
2006	Bigfoot Presents: Meteor and the Mighty Monster Trucks	Cosmo Starfinder	Posthumous release; Final role
