= Bob Dermer =

Canadian retired actor

- Other name: Bobby Dermer
- Occupation: Actor
- Years active: 1965–2001

Bob Dermer is a retired Canadian actor who first made his contributions to Canadian television in 1965 as an actor in Ottawa on a late-night serial called Milk and Honey, which ran for 200 episodes.

Prior to Readalong, Dermer was also on several Canadian children's shows such as Hi Diddle Day which ran for 10 years on the CBC followed by Pencil Box which ran for another six years.

== Career ==
In the 1980s, Dermer appeared on the children's show Today's Special, playing a puppet character named Sam Crenshaw, and starred in the animated Raccoons series and specials as Ralph Raccoon (and various other characters.) He was the voice of Grumpy Bear in the Care Bears films and TV series of that era. In the middle of airing Today's Special in 1984, Dermer was nearly killed in a car accident and suffered from a broken clavicle and thoracic ribs and lost his left eye. He was unable to perform for five months and had to wear an eye patch before having an eyeball transplant.

Later on, he made a cameo appearance in Walt Disney Pictures's 1994 film The Santa Clause before making one final foray in the 1996 made-for-TV movie Hostile Advances: The Kerry Ellison Story. He retired from the TV business in 2001.

== Filmography ==
=== Film ===
Year	Title	Role	Notes
1985	The Care Bears Movie	Grumpy Bear	Voice
1986	Care Bears Movie II: A New Generation	Grumpy Bear	Voice
1987	The Care Bears Adventure in Wonderland	Grumpy Bear	Voice
1988	Care Bears Nutcracker Suite	Grumpy Bear	Voice
1994	The Santa Clause	Puppet Punch	Voice

=== Television ===
Year	Title	Role	Notes
1976	King of Kensington	Norman	Episode: "Duke's Dilemma"
1980	The Christmas Raccoons	Ralph Raccoon	Television film
1981	The Raccoons on Ice	Ralph Raccoon	Television film
1981	Today's Special: Live on Stage	Sam Crenshaw	Television special
1981–1987	Today's Special	Sam Crenshaw	89 episodes
1983	The Raccoons and the Lost Star	Ralph Raccoon	Television film
1984	The Care Bears Battle the Freeze Machine	Frostbite / Cloudkeeper	Television film
1984–1985	Téléfrançais!	Various voices	8 episodes
1985	The Edison Twins	Benny	Episode: "The Mole People"
1985	Care Bears	Grumpy Bear, various voices	11 episodes
1985–1991	The Raccoons	Ralph Raccoon, Lady Baden Baden, additional voices	60 episodes
1986–1988	The Care Bears Family	Grumpy Bear	46 episodes
1990	Basil Hears a Noise	Additional characters	Television film
1994	Road to Avonlea	Emmet Horn	Episode: "Modern Times"
1994	Tales from the Cryptkeeper	Rose's Dad	Episode: "Growing Pains"
1995	The Neverending Story	Jacko	2 episodes
1996	Hostile Advances: The Kerry Ellison Story	Drunk	Television film
