= Noam Zylberman =

Canadian voice actor

- נועם זילברמן
- Born: Haifa, Israel
- Occupation: Voice actor
- Years active: 1980s-present

Noam Zylberman (Hebrew: נועם זילברמן) is an Israeli-born Canadian voice actor.

== Early life ==
Zylberman was born in Haifa, Israel to Jewish parents. His family relocated to Canada when he was two years old. He attended Arlington Middle School and Vaughan Road Collegiate school in Toronto, and has an older sister, Ilana.

== Career ==
While growing up in Richmond Hill, Ontario, Zylberman booked his own audition for a Crunchie commercial at age ten, and had landed several voice acting jobs in animated TV series by the time he was 13 years old. He went on to provide voices for many characters on animated series such as The Raccoons, ALF Tales, Garbage Pail Kids, Sylvanian Families, and Care Bears.

He gained some notoriety playing the title role in The Outside Chance of Maximilian Glick, a coming-of-age feature film about being Jewish in a multicultural rural Manitoba town. In a year-end arts review for 1988, the Toronto Star's Sid Adilman called Zylberman "the best newcomer to English-Canadian movies this year". He was slated to reprise the role in a subsequent CBC Television series, Max Glick, but more than two years passed before production on the series started, and by that time he had grown too tall for the role.

In 1989, he played the role of Tom Bradshaw in the TV movie Last Train Home, and received a nomination for Best Young Actor in a Cable Special at the 12th Youth in Film Awards.

== Voice acting credits ==
- Tommy (1985–1986) and Bentley Raccoon (1987–1990) in The Raccoons
- Fritz in the 1990 animated movie The Nutcracker Prince
- Curtis Shumway in ALF Tales
- Split Kit in Garbage Pail Kids
- Chip in Hello Kitty's Furry Tale Theater
- Billy Wagner in Popples
- Bobby in the Police Academy
- Rusty Wildwood in Sylvanian Families
- Buddy in Little Rosey
- Stoke in Iggy Arbuckle
- Tiger in the 1987 direct-to-video animated cartoon The Wild Puffalumps
- Bookmice
- Babar
- Tales from the Cryptkeeper
- C.O.P.S.
- My Pet Monster
- The Care Bears
- Star Wars: Droids
- Switch in KidsWorld Sports

== Film acting credits ==
- Maximilian in The Outside Chance of Maximilian Glick
- Regan Thatcher in Love and Hate: The Story of Colin and JoAnn Thatcher
- Tom Bradshaw in Tom Alone
- Arthur Bennett in A Town Torn Apart
- Tom Bradshaw in Last Train Home
- Poultry Boy in Lantern Hill
- Eric in The Long Road Home
- Double Standard

== TV series acting credits ==
- Adderly
- Friday the 13th: The Series
- Katts and Dog
- Kung Fu: The Legend Continues
- My Secret Identity
- Riverdale
- T. and T.
- War of the Worlds
