= KidsWorld Sports =

- Genre: Children
- Created by: Christopher Sarson
- Developed by: Breakthrough Films
- Directed by: Paul Kilback
- Countries of origin: France; Canada
- Original languages: English; French
- No. of seasons: 1
- No. of episodes: 26

Production
- Executive producer: Jennifer Essex
- Producers: Paul Kilback; Ira Levy; Peter Williamson
- Production locations: Toronto, Canada
- Editors: Jay Tipping; Jennifer Essex; Marc Dupont; David Grout
- Running time: approx. 30 minutes
- Production companies: Breakthrough Films and Television (Note: As Kids World Sports Productions Inc.); Tele Images Kids

Original release
- Network: Télétoon (France); BBC Kids (Canada); Discovery Kids (United Kingdom)
- Release: August 8, 2004 – January 30, 2005

KidsWorld Sports is a children's television series co-produced by Breakthrough Films and Television and Tele Images Kids in association with BBC Kids, TPS Jeunesse, and Discovery Kids UK. Aimed towards a young teenage audience, each episode features two children from around the globe, who strive for greatness in their chosen sport. The show profiles kids who have the potential to become tomorrow's sport heroes.

== Animated character hosts ==
- Switch (voiced by Noam Zylberman) - a human boy, the main host of KidsWorld Sports
- PAL (voiced by Len Carlson) - Switch's AI co-host

== Episode synopses ==
- Episode 1: Olivier (Wakeboarder) & Fabien (Mountain Biker) (August 8, 2004)
- Episode 2: Wacey (Bull Rider) & Benjamin (Freestyle Kayaker) (August 15, 2004)
- Episode 3: Jeff (Baseball Player) & Bertrand (Summer "Grass" Skier) (August 22, 2004)
- Episode 4: Jake (Mountaineer) & Cedric (Go Kart Racer) (August 29, 2004)
- Episode 5: Tyler (Motocross) & Sabrina (Horse Acrobat) (September 5, 2004)
- Episode 6: Erin (Waterskiing) & Maxime (Spelunking) (September 12, 2004)
- Episode 7: Nina (Skateboarding) & Axelle & Laura (Track & Field Athletics) (September 19, 2004)
- Episode 8: Sarah (Equestrian) & Coralie (Gymnastics) (September 26, 2004)
- Episode 9: Thaine (Football) & Laure (Swimming) (October 3, 2004)
- Episode 10: Sarah (Skeleton) & Isabelle (Naginata) (October 10, 2004)
- Episode 11: Kristen (Rugby) & Stéphane (Inline Skating) (October 17, 2004)
- Episode 12: Colin (Triathlon) & Nathan (Sledge Hockey) (October 24, 2004)
- Episode 13: Connor (Mountain Bike) & Sarah (Tennis) (October 31, 2004)
- Episode 14: Natalie (Shark Diver) & Malik (Soccer) (November 7, 2004)
- Episode 15: Amanda (Cross Country Skiing) & Freddy (Moringue) (November 14, 2004)
- Episode 16: Azucena (Karate) & Nicolas (Trial) (November 21, 2004)
- Episode 17: Shaun (Snowboarding) & Katie/Natasha (Sculling) (November 28, 2004)
- Episode 18: Michelle (Figure Skating) & Laure (Handball) (December 5, 2004)
- Episode 19: Eric (Basketball) & Jonathan (Badminton) (December 12, 2004)
- Episode 20: Sarah (Hockey) & Chloé (Judo) (December 19, 2004)
- Episode 21: Kiara (Dogsled) & Thomas (Fencing) (December 26, 2004)
- Episode 22: Joel (Freestyle Kayaking) & Fabien (Freestyle Skiing) (January 2, 2005)
- Episode 23: Robyn (Synchronized Swimming) & Jamal (Surfing) (January 9, 2005)
- Episode 24: Kaysi (Cheerleading) & Adam (Track Cycling) (January 16, 2005)
- Episode 25: Makenzie (Twirling) & Chelsea (Diving) (January 23, 2005)
- Episode 26: Caitlyn (Wrestling) & Ricardo (Football) (January 30, 2005)

== Broadcast ==
In the United States, the series was originally planned to air on the then-upcoming PBS Kids GO! channel, but the channel ultimately failed to launch.

However, an educational site with related games and activities based on the series was added to the PBS Kids Go! website. The section was retired on January 24, 2013.
