= Kevin Gillis =

Canadian writer

- Born: February 2, 1950 (age 76); Chesterville, Ontario, Canada
- Education: Opeongo High School
- Occupations: Producer; writer; director; composer
- Years active: 1970s–present

Kevin Gillis (born February 2, 1950) is a Canadian television writer, producer, composer and former TV host, mainly known for his work in animation. He is known for creating the Raccoons franchise as well as other cartoons such as Atomic Betty and Producing Parker. He was the host of the fitness show Yes You Can and was originally the managing director at Breakthrough Animation. Gillis is the co-founder and CEO of Skywriter Media & Entertainment Group which develops, produces and distributes television and other forms of media. He was also president of Skyreader Media Inc., an affiliated company of Skywriter Media & Entertainment Group, which produces, develops and distributes interactive e-books.

== Works ==
=== Director ===
- The Christmas Raccoons (1980)
- The Raccoons on Ice (1981)
- The Raccoons and the Lost Star (1983)
- The Raccoons: Let's Dance! (1984)
- The Raccoons (1985–1991)

=== Writer ===
- The Christmas Raccoons (1980)
- The Raccoons on Ice (1981)
- The Raccoons and the Lost Star (1983)
- The Raccoons: Let's Dance! (1984)
- The Raccoons (1985–1991)
- The Nutcracker Prince (1990)
- Jimmy Two-Shoes (2009)

=== Composer ===
- The Christmas Raccoons (1980)
- The Raccoons on Ice (1981)
- The Raccoons and the Lost Star (1983)
- The Raccoons: Let's Dance! (1984)
- The Raccoons (1985–1991)
- Heart of Courage (1993)
- RoboCop: The Series (1994)
- Atomic Betty (2004–2008)

=== Producer ===
- The Christmas Raccoons (1980)
- The Raccoons on Ice (1981)
- The Raccoons and the Lost Star (1983)
- The Raccoons: Let's Dance! (1984)
- The Raccoons (1985–1991)
- The Jeff Healey Band: See the Light – Live from London (1989)
- The Nutcracker Prince (1990)
- Secret Service (1992)
- Heart of Courage (1993)
- A Future to This Life: Robocop - The Series Soundtrack (1995)
- F/X: The Series (1996–1998)
- The True Meaning of Crumbfest (1998)
- Universal Soldier II: Brothers in Arms (1998)
- Universal Soldier III: Unfinished Business (1998)
- The Longhouse Tales (2000)
- Eckhart (2000)
- I Was a Rat (2001)
- Kids World Sports (2004)
- Miss BG (2005–2008)
- Captain Flamingo (2006)
- Atomic Betty (2004–2008)
- Producing Parker (2009–2011)
- Jimmy Two-Shoes (2009–2011)
- My Big Big Friend (2009, post-production)

=== Actor ===
- Yes You Can (1980–1983)
- The Raccoons and the Lost Star (1983; 2023 remaster) – Ranger Dan
- The Raccoons: Let's Dance! (1984) – Ranger Dan (uncredited)
- Noonbory and the Super Seven (2009) – Wangury (as Kevin Aichele)
