= The Raccoons and the Lost Star =

1983 Canadian TV special or program

- Title card
- Genre: Animation; Family; Adventure; Fantasy; Comedy; Drama; Dramedy; Musical
- Written by: Kevin Gillis; Juliet Law Packer
- Directed by: Kevin Gillis
- Starring: John Schneider; Dottie West; Len Carlson; Michael Magee; Bob Dermer; Fred Little; Nick Nichols; Sharon Lewis; Hadley Kay; Tammy Bourne; Kevin Gillis
- Narrated by: Rich Little
- Country of origin: Canada
- Original language: English

Production
- Executive producer: Sheldon S. Wiseman
- Producer: Kevin Gillis
- Cinematography: Kevin Gillis; Jon Stroll
- Editors: John Harris; Norman LeBlanc; Gerald Tripp
- Running time: 49 minutes
- Production companies: Gillis-Wiseman Productions; Atkinson Film-Arts

Original release
- Network: CBC Television
- Release: December 13, 1983

Related
- The Raccoons on Ice (1981); The Raccoons: Let's Dance! (1984)

The Raccoons and the Lost Star is the third of four animated television specials leading up to the animated television series The Raccoons and debuted on 13 December 1983. It came after the first two Raccoons seasonal specials, which were The Christmas Raccoons (1980) and The Raccoons on Ice (1981). There are some thematic elements that did not exist in the first two specials, such as the Raccoons' world being separate from that of the humans, but it is the first one to develop the look and feel of the series. In the United States, where The Raccoons specials were in the top 10 in Nielsen ratings, The Raccoons and the Lost Star was the number one children's two-part special in syndication at the time. The special was remastered in 2023 for streaming.

== Plot ==
One night in the Evergreen Forest, Schaeffer the sheepdog is playing with his human owners, Tommy and Julie, when their father, Ranger Dan has a surprise for them. As Schaeffer takes a brief nap, he is awoken by a glowing red plane that lands in front of the cabin. Schaeffer goes to investigate, but the pilot gets a call from his commanding officer to return to his base. Panicking, Schaeffer climbs into the passenger seat of the plane and is flown away from Earth and to a strange jungle planet. Upon his arrival to a giant base filled with weaponry, he is chased by the forces of the Imperial Commander Cyril Sneer, but escapes them. Schaeffer runs into Sophia Tutu, a friend of his from the planet Earth, although Sophia does not seem to know Schaeffer. Sophia takes Schaeffer to meet Broo, her pet sheepdog puppy. Meanwhile, Cyril Sneer plans to conquer Earth with the help of a magic star, which Broo wears around his neck. The star has enough power to launch his firepower to raid the planet. He sends out his army to hunt down every animal in the jungle and find the star.

Meanwhile, Sophia, Broo, and Schaeffer are captured by the Raccoons (Ralph, Bert and Melissa). The trio are the only animals left in the jungle. They free Sophia, Broo and Schaeffer finding they are on their side. Sophia then meets up with her boyfriend Cedric Sneer and finds out that Cyril is Cedric's father. After a series of animals being rescued and recaptured, Cyril notices on a security tape that Broo has the star. That night, Cyril discovers a "jungle rendezvous" Cedric is having with Sophia and he follows him and has Sophia imprisoned and soon all her friends, but with Broo and Cedric's help, the Raccoons and the other animals escape from Cyril's clutches and destroy his fortress in the process when one of the pigs accidentally breaks the mountain self-destruct lever.

After rejoice, Bert flies Schaeffer back to Earth via airplane. Schaeffer awakes from his long dream and sees Ranger Dan, Tommy and Julie reveal their surprise to him, which turns out to be Broo.

== Cast ==
- Len Carlson - Bert Raccoon / Pig General 1
- Michael Magee - Cyril Sneer / Snag
- Bob Dermer - Ralph Raccoon / Bears
- Dottie West - Melissa Raccoon
- Carl Banas - Schaeffer / Bears
- Fred Little - Cedric Sneer / Pig General 2
- Sharon Lewis - Sophia Tutu / Broo
- John Schneider - Dan the Forest Ranger (not present in 2023 remaster)
- Nick Nichols - Pig General 3
- Tammy Bourne - Julie
- Hadley Kay - Tommy
- Rich Little - Narrator
- Kevin Gillis - pre-end-credits narrator (only for Part One of two-part version) / Dan the Forest Ranger (2023 remaster)

== Songs and performers ==
- John Schneider - "Calling You", "Shining", "One More Night" (duet with Dottie West), "Friends" (duet with Dottie West) [either altered or not present in 2023 remaster]
- Dottie West - "Lions & Tigers", "Fallin', Fallin'" ("Fallin'" is not included in the two-part format)
- Curtis King Jr. - "Missing It" (2023 remaster)
- Rita Coolidge - "You Can Make It/Some Days" (2023 remaster)
- Hank Martin - "Shining", "Friends" (duet with Dottie West) [2023 remaster]

== Reception ==
Variety praised the third special, The Raccoons and the Lost Star, calling it "a rollicking good adventure filled with space-age animation, high-tech gadgetry, lilting tunes, a lovable sheepdog, and the delightful Raccoons team".
