= The Raccoons on Ice =

1981 Canadian TV special or program

- Title card
- Genre: Animation
- Written by: Kevin Gillis; Juliet Law Packer
- Directed by: Kevin Gillis
- Starring: Len Carlson; Michael Magee; Bob Dermer; Rita Coolidge; Carl Banas; Fred Little; Sharon Lewis; Tammy Bourne; Hadley Kay; Leo Sayer; Danny Gallivan
- Narrated by: Rich Little
- Theme music composer: Kevin Gillis; Jon Stroll
- Country of origin: Canada
- Original language: English

Production
- Executive producer: Sheldon S. Wiseman
- Producers: Kevin Gillis; W.H. Stevens Jr. (uncredited)
- Cinematography: Ron Haines; Jan Topper
- Editor: Gerald Tripp
- Running time: 24 minutes
- Production companies: Gillis-Wiseman Productions; Atkinson Film-Arts

Original release
- Release: 20 December 1981

Related
- The Christmas Raccoons (1980); The Raccoons and the Lost Star (1983)

The Raccoons on Ice is the second of three animated television specials leading up to the television series The Raccoons. It initially aired on CBC in Canada on 20 December 1981 and in syndication in the United States on 21 November 1982.

== Plot ==
It is wintertime in the Evergreen Forest. At frozen Evergreen lake, everyone in the forest goes to ice skate and play hockey. Schaeffer, the old sheepdog, goes down to the lake, where he and his friends The Raccoons are playing hockey. Cedric Sneer is also at the rink, too, where he meets Sophia Tutu, a female aardvark figure skater who takes an interest in Cedric.

Cedric's father Cyril Sneer has sinister plans for Evergreen Lake, as he plans on building his 'Cyril Dome' over the entire lake. As Cyril and his construction crew are ready to build, the Raccoons and their friends stop them in their tracks. Bert proposes that the two warring sides should play a hockey game to determine who gets the lake. Cyril trains his Bears for the game and the Raccoons ask Cedric to play on their side, which Cedric agrees to. As they train, Cedric shows great hockey talent, but Cyril spies on the Raccoons and he is displeased with his son siding with the Raccoons. He grounds Cedric for a month and he also forbids Cedric from seeing Sophia (or "Sofa-girl" as Cyril nicknames her) ever again.

The Raccoons and Schaeffer continue to practice. On the night before the game, the friends decide to sneak into Cyril Sneer's mansion to ask Cedric if he will play alongside them. Cedric is too scared of his father's wrath to rejoin them. A moment later, they are almost caught by Cyril, who claims he can hear other voices and angrily threatens his son not to go anywhere near the Raccoons again.

On the night of the game, Cyril's Bears are pummeling the Raccoons team by 3-0. After Bert injures his hand, Sophia finally persuades Cedric to help out. Masquerading as a "mystery player", Cedric manages to tie the game 3-3. Cyril finds out who the mystery player is, literally kicking his own son off the ice and threatening to lock him in the dungeon. The team considers giving up, but Bert refuses to give up so easily. The rest of the team are spurred on by Bert's courage and they go back onto the ice to continue. Bert manages to win the game for the team in the last few seconds, thus saving Evergreen Lake from Cyril's greed.

The next day, Julie, Tommy and their father arrive at the lake and find skate marks from the game. They are utterly puzzled as to who left them, as the humans were never aware of the threat posed to the lake, leaving Ranger Dan to curiously ask Tommy and Julie if they have "been playing any wild hockey games" lately.

== Cast ==
The voice cast included:

- Len Carlson - Bert Raccoon
- Michael Magee - Cyril Sneer / Snag
- Bob Dermer - Ralph Raccoon / Bears
- Rita Coolidge - Melissa Raccoon
- Carl Banas - Schaeffer / Bears
- Fred Little - Cedric Sneer
- Sharon Lewis - Sophia Tutu
- Tammy Bourne - Julie
- Hadley Kay - Tommy
- Leo Sayer - Dan the Forest Ranger
- Danny Gallivan - Ferlin Fielddigger
- Rich Little - Narrator

== Songs and performers ==
- Leo Sayer - "Taking My Time", "You Can Do It", "To Have You" (duet with Rita Coolidge)
- Rita Coolidge - "Some Days"
