= The Christmas Raccoons =

1980 Canadian TV special or program

- Title card
- Written by: Kevin Gillis; Juliet Law Packer
- Directed by: Kevin Gillis; Paul Schibli
- Starring: Len Carlson; Michael Magee; Carl Banas; Rita Coolidge; Bob Dermer; Fred Little; Rupert Holmes; Tammy Bourne; Hadley Kay
- Narrated by: Rich Little
- Theme music composer: Kevin Gillis; Jon Stroll
- Country of origin: Canada
- Original language: English

Production
- Producer: Kevin Gillis
- Editor: Gerald Tripp
- Running time: 25 minutes
- Production companies: Gillis-Wiseman Productions; Atkinson Film-Arts

Original release
- Network: CBC
- Release: 17 December 1980

Related
- The Raccoons on Ice (1981)

The Christmas Raccoons is the first of four Canadian animated television specials, before the main animated television series succeeding it, The Raccoons, took place. It was first broadcast on CBC in Canada on 17 December 1980 and three days later in first-run syndication in the United States on 20 December. The story takes place in the Evergreen Forest, home of the forest ranger Dan, his children Tommy and Julie, and their pet sheepdog, Schaeffer.

The special was followed by The Raccoons on Ice (1981) and The Raccoons and the Lost Star (1983), the direct-to-video special The Raccoons: Let's Dance! (1984) and finally the television series beginning in 1985.

== Plot ==
On 23 December, Ranger Dan receives a call that all the trees in the forest are disappearing. Tommy and Julie are concerned, but Dan is doing the investigating. Meanwhile, in another part of the forest, a trio of raccoons (married couple Ralph and Melissa and their friend Bert) prepare their home, The Raccoondominium, for Christmas. Their joy is cut short when they see in the news that all the trees in the forest are disappearing. Nearby, local aardvark millionaire Cyril Sneer is revealed to be the tree thief hoping to make a profit out of the lumber. His college-educated son Cedric tries to talk him out of his crazed plans to destroy the whole forest. Cyril ignores Cedric and chops down a whole line of trees, including the Raccoondominium. Cyril, however, loses the Raccoons' tree and Tommy, Julie, and Schaeffer find it and take it home.

Left without a home, the Raccoons try to find who's behind the destruction of the forest. Ralph sees Tommy, Julie and Schaeffer dragging it to the cabin and deduces they are the forest destroyers and follows them. While Tommy and Julie go out, leaving Schaeffer alone in the cabin, the Raccoons sneak inside and find the Raccoondominium decorated with ornaments, tinsel, and lights. As Melissa tries to get their Christmas stockings back, Schaeffer wakes up from his nap and chases the Raccoons through the forest. The chase leads the four animals to Cyril's sawmill, where they find the source of the forest destruction. As Cyril and Cedric head out to cut down the rest of the trees in the forest, the Raccoons and Schaeffer catch the two Sneers. After some convincing that there's a profit in planting trees, Cyril reluctantly agrees to replant all of the trees.

The animals are pleased they have saved the forest, but the Raccoons are still homeless. Schaeffer returns to the cabin, where Julie and Tommy wait for him. Just then, Julie and Tommy see the homeless Raccoons in the cold and realise that their Christmas tree must be the Raccoons' home. Julie phones their father to ask him to find a new home for them. Dan agrees and the group celebrate. The next day Julie and Tommy wake up only to find it is Christmas Eve and they must have dreamed the events of the previous 'day'. Dan, however, tells them that the trees have miraculously stopped being cut down. He reads a newspaper article to them which says that thousands of seedlings were planted overnight, but the tree planter is anonymous. Suddenly, Schaeffer, Julie and Tommy see outside the window the Raccoons settling in a newly re-planted tree nearby.

== Cast ==
- Len Carlson – Bert Raccoon
- Michael Magee – Cyril Sneer
- Carl Banas – Schaeffer
- Rita Coolidge – Melissa Raccoon
- Bob Dermer – Ralph Raccoon
- Fred Little – Cedric Sneer
- Rupert Holmes – Dan the Forest Ranger
- Tammy Bourne – Julie
- Hadley Kay – Tommy
- Rich Little – Narrator

== Songs and performers ==
- Rita Coolidge - "Lost Angels", "Lake Freeze"
- Rupert Holmes - "Shake The Sun", "Perfect Tree"

== Production ==
Production of the special began in 1979 and completed in 1980.
