= Norm Berketa =

Canadian actor (born 1963)

- Born: 23 August 1963 (age 63); Toronto, Ontario, Canada
- Genre: Rock
- Occupations: Character actor, voice actor, musician
- Instruments: Drums, guitar
- Website: www.norm.nmbproductions.com

Norm Berketa (born 23 August 1963 in Toronto, Ontario) is a Canadian character actor and voice actor based in Ottawa.

== Biography ==
Norman Mikeal Berketa was born in Toronto, Ontario in 1963, but came to Ottawa in 1969.

He is best known for his acting roles in television and films such as H_{2}O, Beyond Borders, Lost Junction, Big Wolf on Campus, Secret Agent Man and Are You Afraid of the Dark?. More recently he has done voice-overs for animation such as Toad Patrol, Hoze Houndz and Zeroman.

Prior to acting, Berketa was interested in music in the entertainment industry and started-out playing drums and guitar in the rock bands Al's Garage and Silent Q. After a successful summer with Silent Q, the band re-structured and became the Initiatives.

After a short while Berketa began his solo music endeavour by purchasing some analog recording equipment and building an analog studio. To date he has over 300 original songs to his credit, and he has fully converted his studio to digital.

Eight years later, in 1996, he left retail management and began doing dinner theatre and radio in Ottawa. In August 1998, he secured his first TV role and has been acting ever since.

Berketa currently lives in Ottawa with his wife and two children.

== Selected filmography ==
- Arthur (1996, TV series) – (voice)
- Soldier of Fortune, Inc. (1997, TV series) – Security Guard
- Freaky Stories (1997, TV series) – (voice)
- Princess Sissi (1997, TV series) – (voice)
- Patrol 03 (1997, TV series) – (voice)
- Animal Crackers (1997, TV series) – (voice)
- The Country Mouse and the City Mouse Adventures (1997-1999, TV series) – (voice)
- Jim Button (1998, TV series) – (voice)
- Flight Squad (1998, TV series) – (voice)
- Big Wolf on Campus (1999, TV series) – Mr. Shashefsky
- The Collectors (1999, TV movie) – Bank Manager
- Hoze Houndz (1999, TV series) – Klock (season 1) (voice)
- Misguided Angels (1999, TV series) – Honest Fred
- Kevin Spencer (1999, TV series) – Mr. Franklin (voice)
- Tommy and Oscar (1999, TV series) – (voice)
- Are You Afraid of the Dark? (1999, TV series)
- Nuremberg (2000, TV Mini-Series) – American Photographer
- Jackie Bouvier Kennedy Onassis (2000, TV movie) – Young Maurice Tempelsman
- The Kiss of Debt (2000) – Father Gardenia
- For Better or For Worse (2000, TV series) – (voice)
- Secret Agent Man (2000, TV series)
- House of Luk (2001) – Man in Car
- Untalkative Bunny (2001, TV series) – (voice)
- The Score (2001) – Bureaucrat Official
- After Amy (2001, TV movie) – Michael O'Donnell
- Protection (2001) – Ernst
- The Endless Grind (2002) (TV series) – Park Employee
- The Sum of All Fears (2002) – American Scientist
- Toad Patrol (2002, TV series) – (voice)
- Lost Junction (2003) – Mr. Thompson
- Beyond Borders (2003) – Police Officer
- The Secret World of Benjamin Bear (2003, TV series) – (voice)
- The Eggs (2004, TV series) – (voice)
- Zeroman (2004, TV series) – Mayor MacWald / Bucky Dentyne (voice)
- Mann to Mann (2004) (TV series) – Ventriloquist
- H_{2}O (2004, TV miniseries) – Elliot Cressman
- A Taste of Jupiter (2005, TV movie) – Security Guard
- Deadly Isolation (2005, TV movie) – Daniel Garrett
- Faireez (2005, TV series) – (voice)
- Proof of Lies (2006, TV movie) – Campus Cop
- Rumours (2006, TV series) – Gary
- I Me Wed (2007) (TV movie) – Supplier
- Custody (2007, TV movie) – Security Guard
- My Daughter's Secret (2007, TV movie) – Albert
- Jack Brooks: Monster Slayer (2007) – Man in Hardware Store
- A Near Death Experience (2008, TV movie) – Detective Jeff Mader
- Sophie (2008, TV series) – Ventriloquist
- Die (2010) – Security Guard
- Eddie: The Sleepwalking Cannibal (2012) – Bartender
- Tell the World (2016) – Exeter Pastor
