= Eleanor Norrie =

Canadian politician

The Honourable Eleanor Norrie ECNS

MLA for Truro-Bible Hill
- In office 1993–1998
- Preceded by: Ron Giffin
- Succeeded by: Jamie Muir

Personal details
- Born: 1942 (age 83–84) Tatamagouche Mountain, Nova Scotia
- Party: Liberal

Eleanor Elizabeth Tucker Norrie (born 1942) is a former teacher, restaurant owner and politician in Nova Scotia, Canada. She represented Truro-Bible Hill in the Nova Scotia House of Assembly from 1993 to 1998 as a Liberal member.

Norrie was born in Tatamagouche Mountain, Nova Scotia and was educated at Colchester County Academy and the provincial normal school. Norrie entered provincial politics in the 1993 election, defeating former Progressive Conservative MLA Jack Coupar by 187 votes in the Truro-Bible Hill riding. In June 1993, Norrie was appointed to the Executive Council of Nova Scotia as Minister of the Civil Service. She became Minister of Human Resources later that year when the Civil Service Commission was replaced with the Department of Human Resources. In March 1995, Norrie was shuffled to Minister of Housing and Consumer Affairs. In March 1996, Norrie was named Minister of Natural Resources. She was dropped from the cabinet when Russell MacLellan took over as premier in July 1997.

Norrie reoffered in the 1998 election, but was defeated by Progressive Conservative Jamie Muir. She later served as the president of the Liberal association for the federal riding of Cumberland—Colchester—Musquodoboit Valley.
