= Lacewood Productions =

Canadian animation studio and production company

- Industry: Animation
- Predecessor: Hinton Animation Studios
- Founded: 1988; 38 years ago
- Founder: Sheldon Wiseman
- Defunct: 1998; 28 years ago
- Fate: Bankruptcy and liquidation along with and by parent company Acquired by Amberwood Entertainment
- Successor: Amberwood Entertainment Corporation
- Headquarters: Ottawa, Ontario, Canada
- Products: Television series
- Owner: Wiseman & Sons (1984–1995)
- Parent: Paragon Entertainment Corporation (1995–1998)

Lacewood Productions was a Canadian animation studio and production company based in Ottawa, Ontario. Founded in 1988, it was well-known for producing a television series, Katie and Orbie, as well as specials based on For Better or For Worse, and the 1990 feature The Nutcracker Prince. The company was originally owned by Wiseman & Sons. In 1995, Paragon Entertainment Corporation acquired the studio for CA $3.2 million. In 1997, Paragon raised the company's stake to 75% and eventually took control of it later that year. Paragon eventually declared bankruptcy in 1998, with most of Lacewood's library and former assets being acquired by Amberwood Entertainment in 2000.

Lacewood was the successor to Hinton Animation Studios, a company created by Sheldon Wiseman, which closed down due to debt problems.

The first productions made by the studio were The Railway Dragon and its sequel The Birthday Dragon.

Lacewood has also done animation services on the first season of Nickelodeon's The Ren & Stimpy Show. According to Thad Komorowski, the studio had a hostile working environment comparable to that of Spümcø, not paying employees well, and its output was subpar, with John Kricfalusi's high standards demotivating the studio; it backed out after animating six episodes, despite Kricfalusi's approval of their work.

Lacewood has also done animation production in partnership with Universal Cartoon Studios on season 2 of Problem Child, Monster Force and 1995 episodes of The Savage Dragon.

== Spin-off company ==
Amberwood Entertainment Corporation
- Industry: Animation
- Predecessor: Lacewood Productions
- Founded: 1997; 29 years ago
- Founder: Sheldon Wiseman
- Headquarters: Ottawa, Ontario, Canada
- Products: Television series

Amberwood Entertainment Corporation (known by its animation industry name as Amberwood Productions) is a Canadian animation studio founded in 1997 by Sheldon Wiseman. The company bought Lacewood Productions' assets from Paragon Entertainment Corporation in 2000. Amberwood was best known for producing The Secret World of Benjamin Bear (a follow-up series to Lacewood's The Teddy Bears specials), Hoze Houndz, Katie and Orbie and RollBots.

=== Productions ===
Show	Creator(s)	Years aired	# of seasons	# of episodes produced	Status
Pumper Pups (Note: First series produced by the company.)	Gerald Tripp	1999	1	52	Ended
Hoze Houndz	Gerald Tripp	1999–2006	6	78	Ended
Katie and Orbie (Note: Only the last three seasons were produced by Amberwood.)	Ben and Susan Wicks	1993–2003	6	78	Ended
The Secret World of Benjamin Bear (Note: Follow-up of Lacewood's Teddy Bears specials.)	Sheldon Wiseman and Ken Anderson	2003–2009	4	52	Ended
Zeroman	J.D. Smith, Gerald Tripp and Jonathan Wiseman	2004	1	13	Ended
The Snow Queen	Sheldon Wiseman	2005	none	none	Completed
RollBots	Michael Milligan ("MCM")	2009	1	26	Ended
Rob the Robot (Note: Only series to be produced where Sheldon Wiseman was already working on a different project.)	Manuel Rosen	2010–2013	3	104	Ended
The Magic Hockey Skates	Sheldon Wiseman	2013	none	none	Completed
Shutterbugs	Craig Young, Micheal Milligan and Cory Morrison	2015	1	52	Ended
Wolf Joe	Alexander Bar	2021	1	52	Ended

== Books ==
- Komorowski, Thad (2017). Sick Little Monkeys: The Unauthorized Ren & Stimpy Story. Albany, Georgia: BearManor Media. ISBN 978-1629331836.

== See also ==
- History of Canadian animation
- Tooth Fairy, Where Are You?
