= Hoze Houndz =

Canadian animated television program

- Created by: Gerald Tripp
- Voices of: Rick Jones; Michael O'Reilly; Lianne Picard-Poirier; Anne Lishman; Thelma Farmer
- Composer: Edmund Egan
- Country of origin: Canada
- No. of seasons: 6
- No. of episodes: 78 (156 segments)

Production
- Executive producer: Sheldon Wiseman
- Producer: Mark Edwards
- Running time: 30 minutes
- Production companies: Amberwood Entertainment; Alliance Atlantis

Original release
- Network: Family Channel
- Release: October 4, 1999 – July 4, 2006

Hoze Houndz is a Canadian animated series which premiered October 4, 1999 on Family Channel. It features six dalmatian dogs (Hozer, Squirt, Steamer, Fontaine, Crystal and Brooke) who work as firefighters in the fictional town of Bonehead Hollow.

Produced by Amberwood Entertainment, with production, pre-sales and licensing by Alliance Atlantis, each of the 78 half-hour episodes produced consisted of two 11 minute stories with interstitials.

The 2002 episodes "Hockey Night in Bonehead Hollow" and "Phantom in the Arena" featured Ron MacLean and Don Cherry voicing commentators at hockey games, parodying their own real-life roles with Hockey Night in Canada.

== Cast ==
- Rick Jones as Hozer, Squirt
- Michael O'Reilly as Steamer
- David L. McCallum as Melvin McKie, Duncan McDrool
- Norm Berketa as Klock (season 1)
- Kevin Tysick as Murry, Smirk, Klock (season 2), Additional Voices
- Lianne Picard-Poirier as Crystal, Brooke
- Kristen C. Smith as Mole Person, Reporter, The Torch
- Anne Lishman as Fontaine (season 1)
- Thelma Farmer as Fontaine (season 2)
- Timothy Mooney as Bob
- Dean Hagopian as Additional Voices
- Tori Hammond as Peggy
- Dean Hawes as Additional Voices
- John Koensgen as Additional Voices
- Terrence Scammell as Additional Voices
- Kate Hurman as Additional Voices
- Brady Moffatt as Additional Voices
- Michael O'Reilly as Additional Voices
- Debbie Murphy as Additional Voices
- Paul Rainville as Additional Voices
- Ross Wilson as Additional Voices
- Peter Dillon as Additional Voices
- John Stocker as Additional Voices
- Genevieve Spicer as Additional Voices
- Jerri Southcott as Additional Voices
- Dave Brown as Additional Voices

== Credits ==
- Sheldon Wiseman - executive producer
- Neil Hunter - creative producer, director, story editor
- Stacey Eberschlag - director
- Chris Butler - storyboard supervisor
- Dave Brown - layout supervisor
- Mike Stevens - posing supervisor
- Derek Bond - design supervisor
- Peter R. Brown - overseas animation supervisor
- Edmund Egan - music
- Michael O'Hara - layout artist

== Broadcast ==
In addition to running on Family Channel in Canada, the show was also broadcast in Spain.

== See also ==
- Dog City
- Road Rovers
- Basket Fever
