= Jamie Muir (politician) =

Canadian politician

The Honourable Jamie Muir ECNS

Member of the Nova Scotia House of Assembly for Truro-Bible Hill
- In office 24 March 1998 – 9 June 2009
- Preceded by: Eleanor Norrie
- Succeeded by: Lenore Zann

Minister of Finance
- In office 10 March 2009 – 19 June 2009
- Premier: Rodney MacDonald
- Preceded by: Chris d'Entremont
- Succeeded by: Graham Steele

Personal details
- Born: 2 February 1941 (age 85) Truro, Nova Scotia
- Party: Progressive Conservative
- Children: 4

Jamie Muir (born 2 February 1941) is a Canadian educator and politician. He represented the electoral district of Truro-Bible Hill in the Nova Scotia House of Assembly from 1998 to 2009. He was a member of the Progressive Conservative Party of Nova Scotia.

== Background ==
Born in 1941 at Truro, Nova Scotia, Muir graduated from Dalhousie University with a Bachelor of Arts and Bachelor of Education degree before completing his Master's and Doctorate degrees in education at the University of Virginia.

In 1964, he married Mary Jean Cox. They have four children.

== Employment history ==
Muir taught as a Frontier College instructor and a high school teacher in Truro before serving as Director of Inspection Services in the Nova Scotia Department of Education. He also served as inspector of schools in Cumberland, Colchester and Hants counties.

He has taught at the post-secondary level, lecturing at University of Prince Edward Island, serving as assistant professor at Memorial University of Newfoundland, senior research associate at the Atlantic Institute of Education, principal of the Nova Scotia Teachers College from 1989 to 1994 and as a faculty member in the education department at St. Francis Xavier University.

== Political career ==
Muir entered provincial politics in the 1998 election, defeating former Liberal cabinet minister Eleanor Norrie in the Truro-Bible Hill riding. He was re-elected in the 1999 election. In August 1999, Muir was appointed to the Executive Council of Nova Scotia as Minister of Health. On 19 December 2002, Muir was moved to Attorney General and Minister of Justice.

In the 2003 election, Muir was re-elected by over 1500 votes. On 15 August 2003, Muir was moved to Minister of Education in a post-election cabinet shuffle. He retained the education portfolio when Rodney MacDonald took over as premier in February 2006.

Muir was re-elected in 2006. On 26 June 2006, MacDonald shuffled his cabinet, moving Muir to Minister of Service Nova Scotia and Municipal Relations. In October 2007, Muir was given an additional role in cabinet as chair of the Treasury and Policy Board. Muir announced on 29 December 2008, that he would not reoffer in the next election, and was shuffled out of cabinet on 7 January 2009. He returned to cabinet on 10 March 2009, taking over as Minister of Finance and Minister of Aboriginal Affairs, following the death of Michael Baker. Muir retired later that year.
