= The Nutcracker Prince =

1990 film by Paul Schibli

- Theatrical release poster by John Alvin
- Directed by: Paul Schibli
- Screenplay by: Patricia Watson
- Based on: The Nutcracker and the Mouse King by E. T. A. Hoffmann; The Nutcracker by Tchaikovsky & Petipa
- Produced by: Kevin Gillis
- Starring: Kiefer Sutherland; Megan Follows; Mike MacDonald; Peter Boretski; Phyllis Diller; Peter O'Toole; Noam Zylberman
- Edited by: Sue Robertson
- Music by: Victor Davies; Peter Illich Tchaikovsky
- Production companies: Lacewood Productions; Hinton Animation Studios; Boulevard Entertainment; Allied Filmmakers
- Distributed by: Cineplex Odeon Films
- Release dates: November 21, 1990 (United States); November 23, 1990 (Canada)
- Running time: 75 minutes
- Country: Canada
- Language: English
- Budget: $8.5 million
- Box office: $1.7 million (US) $2 million (Canada)

The Nutcracker Prince is a 1990 Canadian animated romance fantasy film directed by Paul Schibli based on the screenplay by Patricia Watson. It is a retelling of E. T. A. Hoffmann's 1816 short story "The Nutcracker and the Mouse King" and Marius Petipa & Pyotr Ilyich Tchaikovsky's 1892 ballet The Nutcracker, about a girl named Clara who is gifted a special nutcracker by her uncle. The gift draws her into a world of magic and wonder, and she brings about the conclusion to the legend of The Nutcracker, Prince of the Dolls: a young man named Hans who was transformed into a nutcracker by mice, and can only break the spell if he slays the Mouse King. The film stars Kiefer Sutherland as Hans (The Nutcracker), Megan Follows as Clara, Mike MacDonald as the evil Mouse King, Peter O'Toole as Pantaloon, an old soldier, Phyllis Diller as the Mouse Queen, and Peter Boretski as Uncle Drosselmeier.

The Nutcracker Prince was released by Warner Bros. Pictures in the United States on November 21, 1990, and by Cineplex Odeon Films in Canada on November 23, 1990. The film grossed $3.7 million worldwide against a production budget of $8.5 million. It generally received negative reviews from critics and was considered a commercial failure.

== Plot ==
In 19th century Germany, Clara Stahlbaum, her younger brother Fritz and their family celebrate Christmas Eve, though Clara is jealous that her older sister Louise already has a boyfriend Erik, leaving her wondering about growing up. She immediately cheers up when Drosselmeier, an eccentric toymaker and family friend, arrives at their home with special gifts: a fully automated toy castle for everyone, and a Nutcracker for Clara. While trying to crack nuts with it, Fritz damages the Nutcracker. To cheer the heartbroken Clara up, Drosselmeier tells her a story about how the Nutcracker came to be the Prince of the Dolls.

As Drosselmeier relates, there were a King and a Queen who had a beautiful but vain daughter named Princess Perlipat. To celebrate the King's birthday, the Queen made a special cake out of blue cheese, but the scent of the cheese drew out all the castle mice, who ate and destroyed the cake. Enraged at it, the King commanded Drosselmeier, who was royal inventor and magician at the time, to capture all the mice; Drosselmeier and his nephew, Hans, succeeded, but the Mouse Queen and her son escaped. In revenge, the Mouse Queen cast a spell on Perlipat, causing her to become hideously ugly, and Drosselmeier was given the task of figuring out how to cure the princess. He eventually learned that the fabled Krakatooth Nut could cure her, and the King commanded all the princes and noblemen in the realm to apply, with the promise of marriage to Perlipat once she was cured. However, the Krakatooth was so hard that all the men's teeth shattered upon trying to crack it. Drosselmeier was about to be executed for his failure when Hans stepped in and cracked the nut, thus succeeded in curing Perlipat of the spell that the Mouse Queen cast on her. Furious, the Mouse Queen cast a spell on Hans, turning him into a Nutcracker. During the subsequent ruckus, she was killed by a falling statue, and her son's tail was damaged. Now free of his domineering mother, he made himself King of the Mice and swore revenge on Hans, while Drosselmeier was exiled by the ungrateful King.

Clara is upset by the story's ending, but Drosselmeier tells her that the Nutcracker will break the spell if he can slay the Mouse King. Meanwhile, in the middle of the night, Clara returns to the living room to spend time with the Nutcracker, when suddenly the Mouse King and an army of mice appear. A ghostly apparition of Drosselmeier also arrives and casts a spell that breathes life into all the dolls, including the Nutcracker, Marie, Trudy and the toy soldier Pantaloon. The two parties engage in battle, in which course the Mouse King threatens to kill the Nutcracker. Clara prevents this by throwing her slipper at the Mouse King, but then slips on a toy cannonball, falls backwards and hits her head, losing consciousness. The next morning, while she recovers, Drosselmeier comes visiting. Clara accuses him of putting the Nutcracker - his enchanted nephew - in danger, but Drosselmeier explains that only Clara can help him break the spell.

That night, the Mouse King returns, angry about Clara's interference. Clara briefly traps him within her bedside table drawer, but when she retrieves the Nutcracker, the Mouse King escapes and threatens to harm her kitten, Pavlova, if she doesn't hand the Nutcracker over. Drosselmeier reappears, and the toys awaken once more. The Nutcracker faces the Mouse King in single combat and defeats him, but Pantaloon is damaged while trying to help him. In order to get him cured, Nutcracker, Trudy and Marie prepare to travel to the Land of the Dolls through Drosselmeier's mechanical castle; Clara accompanies them after Drosselmeier magically shrinks her. However, the Mouse King, though critically wounded, has survived the duel and pursues them.

Arriving at the royal castle of the Land of the Dolls, Clara is given a grand welcome, but although she has fallen in love with the Nutcracker, she hesitates in joining him as his princess due to the fact that she can't abandon her family. Her reluctance negates the spell which animated the dolls, and they revert to lifeless toys. The Mouse King appears and goes after Clara with his dying strength, but ends up falling off the castle's balcony and drowning in the lake below. As Clara begins crying for the Nutcracker, mist begins to fill the castle, and she abruptly finds herself back home and the Nutcracker missing. Clara rushes to Drosselmeier's workshop, where she anxiously asks him about whether all what she has gone through was real, when they are joined by Hans, now cured of the curse and back to human form.

== Voice cast ==
- Kiefer Sutherland as Prince Hans / The Nutcracker
- Megan Follows as Clara Stahlbaum
- Peter Boretski as Elias Christian Drosselmeier
- Phyllis Diller as The Mouse Queen
- Mike MacDonald as The Mouse King
- Peter O'Toole as Pantaloon
- Lynne Gorman as Trudy
- George Merner as Dr. Carl Stahlbaum
- Stephanie Morgenstern as Louise Stahlbaum
- Christopher Owens as Erik
- Diane Stapley as Mrs. Ingrid Stahlbaum
- Mona Waserman as Princess Perlipat
- Noam Zylberman as Fritz Stahlbaum

=== Additional voices ===
- Len Carlson as King, Mouse, Court Attendant, Band Member #2, Spectator and Soldier
- Marvin Goldhar as Mr. Schaeffer, Mouse, Guest #3, First Guard, Soldier, Band Member #1, Contestant and Spectator
- Keith Hampshire as Mouse, Guest, Second Guard, Contestant, Spectator and Soldier
- Elizabeth Hanna as Marie, Mrs. Schaeffer, Doll, Guest #4 and Spectator
- Susan Roman as Mouse, Mrs. Miller, Guest #1, Doll and Spectator
- Theresa Sears as Queen, Mouse, Guest #2, Doll and Spectator

== Production ==
=== Development ===
In the late 1980s, Warner Bros. began production on their film Rover Dangerfield, with the intention of a 1988 release. The film was originally intended to be R-rated, in the vein of Ralph Bakshi's films, but during production executives requested that the idea be reworked into a family-friendly film. This resulted in production being delayed, as large portions of the film had to be redone. While Rover Dangerfield was being completed, the studio looked at external production companies to source animated films they could release, which is how Warner Bros. came to partner with Lacewood Productions to release The Nutcracker Prince.

=== Music ===
Promotional single cover

The music was adapted in part from Tchaikovsky's The Nutcracker from 1892 by Victor Davies, altering the original and adding new tracks as well. For the recording, Boris Brott conducted the London Symphony Orchestra.

In 1990, Atlantic Records gave away Promotional recordings of the single "Always Come Back to You" as performed by Robert Matarazzo and Rachele Cappelli. The song, which was used during the first dance between Clara and the Nutcracker, featured David Fields on Guitar, Shane Keister on the keyboard, and David Beal on Drums.

== Release ==
=== Box office ===
The Nutcracker Prince opened in 906 screens across the United States on November 21, 1990, the film only earned a disappointing $1.7 million because Warner Bros. Pictures, which owned the American distribution rights, gave it very little promotion. It opened in Canadian theaters two days later on November 23, and also only pulled in $2 million in theatrical revenues in Canada.

=== Home media ===
The film was initially released on VHS on November 27, 1991, by Warner Home Video in the United States and Cineplex Odeon Video in Canada. It was later re-released on August 13, 1996, as part of the Warner Bros. Classic Tales series, and again in 1999 through Warner Bros. Family Entertainment.

The film has been released on DVD several times. It was initially released by Hollywood DVD on October 14, 2001, in the United Kingdom. A Region 1 DVD was released in Canada and the US by GoodTimes Entertainment on November 9, 2004. This DVD was sourced from the Canadian print, as a result, this caused the Warner Bros. Pictures and Warner Bros. Presents notice that was used on the American Theatrical and VHS release to be deleted. On April 2, 2007, it was released in on DVD for the second time in the United Kingdom by Boulevard Entertainment. Both releases have no extras besides animated menus and a theatrical trailer.

== Reception ==
=== Critical response ===
The film had received negative reviews from critics. On Rotten Tomatoes the film has an approval rating of 14%.

=== U.S. reviews ===
A review in TV Guide stated that "regrettably, this animated film is an unabashed bore, and that's a shame because the glorious Tchaikovsky ballet has been loved and admired by generations of stage, film, and television viewers of all ages. Why Warner Bros. selected this Canadian-produced independent feature as its Christmas 1990 family attraction is puzzling, given the lackluster quality of the production." Charles Solomon of the Los Angeles Times said that "watching 'The Nutcracker Prince,' a new Canadian animated feature, is every bit as much fun as getting underwear for Christmas when you're 8 years old. A blend of leaden gags, muddled storytelling and Saturday morning-style animation, it's more a holiday threat than a treat." Caryn James of The New York Times wrote that "the new, animated 'Nutcracker Prince' brings together Tchaikovsky's music, E. T. A. Hoffman's story and a few glib modern touches to create a muddled and bland version, which isn't the kind of difference it needs." Kathleen Carroll of the New York Daily News wrote that "the movie attempts to re-dramatize E. T. A. Hoffmann's beloved tale The Nutcracker, but even Peter Ilyich Tchaikovsky's familiar score—the incomparable Nutcracker ballet—fails to lift the spirits in this rather mundane production." Karin Lipson of New York Newsday called the film "a rather bland Christmas pudding, not unpleasant, but not as memorable as it aims to be."

Roger Ebert of Chicago Sun-Times, was critical of the film, calling it "innocuous." "The level of imagination in the story is about as inventive as on most Saturday morning cartoon shows", he remarked in a print review in which he also panned the characterization of the Nutcracker as a "monster", adding:

In the real world, when a person is so lacking in empathy that he kills someone else simply for his own convenience, he is known as a psychopath. Why does our society give its children so many stories in which the heroes, not the villains, are psychopaths?

He also named it one of the worst films of 1990, calling it "a witless and lackluster animated film relieved only by occasional snatches of The Nutcracker Suite". He and co-host Gene Siskel subsequently recalled that the picture went blank at a preview screening they attended; he said neither of them bothered to tell the projectionist to turn the picture back on because the film "was better that way". In his print review for the Chicago Tribune, he called the film:

A cheesy animated feature that slaps together two drawing styles in a ripoff of the fairy tale about a nutcracker that comes to life. The opening minutes set up a standard European holiday scene with a little girl getting some toys from her Uncle Drosselmeier, a sly woodcarver. Drosselmeier's nutcracker eventually will do battle with an evil rat in scenes that are needlessly horrifying for the film's targeted young audience. For no apparent reason there's a subplot, drawn in the sketchy style of TV's "Fractured Fairy Tales," involving the background of the nutcracker. This will thoroughly frustrate your kids. Spare them the agony.

Rita Kempley of The Washington Post said it was "an awkwardly directed, badly drawn animated feature [that] wheezes toward its familiar climax like an arthritic ballerina in 50-pound dancing shoes. Laborious and saccharine, this Canadian adaptation extracts all grace and relevance from the classic enchantment, as well as all immortality and magic from Tchaikovsky's lovely score. It's an embarrassment of travesties." Stephen Hunter wrote a scathing review of the film in The Baltimore Sun, where he remarked:

If you've been bad, boys and girls, Santa is no longer to leave a lump of coal in your stocking. Oh no. Now the wise old guy, in the red suit who knows if you've been naughty or nice is going to leave you a ticket to "The Nutcracker Prince." So you'd better straighten up and fly right, you little rats, or I am going to take you to this movie and make you sit through it all without popcorn or nachos or warm dogs and no, no, oh, no, you can't go to the bathroom, you can't talk, hah, no,- you just have to sit there and watch the damned movie! And if that doesn't get the message! across . . . I'll take you to it again! [emphasis in original]

Lou Cedrone, of Baltimore's Evening Sun, said that "it isn't a long film, and the music, as always, is very easy listening. Adults can always concentrate on that. The characters play like vintage Disney. The villains are of the darkest hue, and the good guys are so sweet, you can hardly begin to believe them. Would that we could."

=== Canadian reviews ===
Catherine Dunphy of The Toronto Star called the film "a cartoon within a cartoon within another cartoon. It's never boring but, yes, it can get confusing." A critic for the Vancouver Sun said it was "a passable children's entertainment, but the animation is stiff and it has none of the magic of the ballet." Mark Horton, however, gave it a positive three-star review in the Edmonton Journal, calling it "an enchanting little film that's complete with a few laughs and a delightful bit of animation that separates reality from fantasy. And at less than 90 minutes, it's a movie that should appeal to the very young and restless. There's plenty here to keep little boys and girls enthralled as a young lady comes of age gently, of course and the Nutcracker comes alive and battles the malicious Mouse-king." Noel Taylor of the Ottawa Citizen gave the film three-and-a-half stars, and called the film "pure Nutcracker—sweet, sprightly and full of good things like Christmas card villages filled with Christmas card people, traditional toys, handsome princes, dimpled daughters and bumbling old fathers. It even has a cuddly kitten who plays with a ball of wool, and mice galore. Only the mice are different. In a crafty switch on cartoon practices these mice are bad, the aggressors and no longer the victims, with a king who's a positive pain. But funny besides. As well, there's music by Tchaikovsky, a smidgin of ballet in an abstract waltz that looks like moving wallpaper, and a song written by Kevin Gillis. If only they'd been a bit bolder with it, and not saved it up for the closing credits. The art of animation has taken some curious twists in the last few years. But The Nutcracker Prince belongs to that brand which Disney has perfected and seldom strays from. I wasn't with a child, but checked with a few after the preview and found general enthusiasm. Parents too."

=== Accolades ===
Year	Award	Category	Result	Ref.
1990	Young Artist Award	Most Entertaining Family Youth Motion Picture - Animation	Nominated	

== See also ==
- The Nutcracker and the Mouse King
- The Nutcracker
- Canadian animation
- List of Christmas films
