= Ron Giffin =

Canadian politician (1942–2021)

The Honourable Ron Giffin ECNS QC

MLA for Truro-Bible Hill
- In office 1978–1993
- Preceded by: new riding
- Succeeded by: Eleanor Norrie

Personal details
- Born: December 1, 1942 Windsor, Nova Scotia
- Died: April 15, 2021 (aged 78)
- Party: Progressive Conservative
- Occupation: Lawyer

Ronald Chapman Giffin, QC (December 1, 1942 – April 15, 2021) was a lawyer and politician in Nova Scotia, Canada. He represented Truro-Bible Hill in the Nova Scotia House of Assembly from 1978 to 1993 as a Progressive Conservative member.

He was born in Windsor, Nova Scotia and was educated at the Windsor Academy, Acadia University and Dalhousie Law School. He was called to the Nova Scotia bar in 1966 and set up practice in Truro. Giffin was named Queen's Counsel in 1982. He served in the Executive Council of Nova Scotia as Minister of Municipal Affairs, Minister of Transportation, Minister of Vocational and Technical Training, Minister of Education, Attorney General and Provincial Secretary. He was also president of the Nova Scotia Treasury Board.

Giffin died on April 15, 2021.
