= Victor Davies =

Canadian composer, pianist and conductor

Victor Albert Davies CM is a Canadian composer, pianist, and conductor, best known for his opera Transit of Venus and The Mennonite Piano Concerto.

== Biography ==
Davies was born in Winnipeg, Manitoba, in 1939. As a child and teenager, he studied the piano and violin, sang in church choirs, played in jazz and rock bands, and took courses with Ronald Gibson and Peggie Sampson at the University of Manitoba. He studied composition at Indiana University where he graduated with a bachelor's degree in music in 1964. Between 1968 and 1970 he led and composed for a 'third stream' jazz ensemble and attended Pierre Boulez's 1969 conducting class in Switzerland.

In 1959 he became organist-choirmaster at Wesley United Church, Winnipeg where he served for many years. He became the music director at the Manitoba Theatre Centre in 1964 and from 1966 to 1970 he worked as a composer, arranger, and conductor for CBC Radio and television. In 1970 he began to work as a freelance composer and arranger, and in 1977 he moved to Toronto where he still resides. He was president of the Canadian League of Composers 1979-82 and began to sit on the board of directors of SOCAN in 1997. He was honored with an honorary doctorate from the University of Manitoba in 2007. In 2014, he was named a Member of the Order of Canada.

== Compositions ==
As a composer, Davies's music is fundamentally optimistic in disposition which critics have often described as "happy", "cheerful", and "uplifting". Rhythmically vigorous, well orchestrated, and readily accessible, his music strives for simplicity and elegance while still using a wide range of historical and contemporary musical forms and techniques such as twelve-tone, aleatoric, jazz, and popular music elements.

A pragmatist, Davies has criticized the trend within classical composition to reject popular music forms. He believes it is socially irresponsible to pursue the clever or different merely for the sake of academic approval. Davies says that "artists must have utility in the community, and their music must embody melodies that are memorable, something that is cherishable."

Davies first came to public attention for his Mennonite Piano Concerto which was commissioned by the B.B. Fast Foundation. The concerto premiered on 27 October 1975 by the Winnipeg Symphony Orchestra under the baton of Bill Baerg with pianist Irmgard Baerg. The work was received with high praise and has since been recorded several times, including a 1983 recording with Baerg and the London Symphony Orchestra.

He has since composed a variety of compositions in several genres including symphonic works, chamber music, film and television scores, operas, musical theater, and jazz music among others. He has written over 600 songs for the CTV children's series Let's Go and Rockets. His other compositions for stage, television, and film include, The Last Winter (1990), The Nutcracker Prince (1990), Tooth Fairy, Where Are You?, The Nature of Things (2002), For the Moment (1994), the music for the 1999 Pan American Games, and the musical The Importance of Being Ernest which was performed for the Stratford Festival in 2005.

He has written music for several commissions including Pulsations (1978) for the CBC; Anerca (1969) for the Contemporary Dancers; Animal Capers (1983) for the Famous People Players; The Magic Trumpet (1969) and Reginald the Robot (1971) for the Manitoba Theatre Centre; Fun For Four (1980) for the Orford String Quartet; The Big Top (1985) for the Royal Winnipeg Ballet; numerous works for the Winnipeg Symphony Orchestra including Celebrations (1969), From Harmony (1968), A Short Symphony (1974), and the Jazz Piano Concerto (2001); Jazz Concerto for Organ and Orchestra (2000) for Wayne Marshall; and Yukon Scenes (1985/1997) for the Yukon Arts Council among others. The Musical Circus was commissioned by Soundstage Canada in 1981, which performed the work in Eastern Europe.

Perhaps his most highly regarded work is his oratorio Revelation which uses texts from the Bible's Book of Revelation. It premiered in February 1996 by the Winnipeg Symphony Orchestra and the Mennonite Oratorio Choir under Bramwell Tovey and has subsequently been performed in Vancouver, Ottawa, and Hamilton. This was followed in 2007 by the opera Transit of Venus, commissioned by Manitoba Opera.

In 2008, Davies completed a tuba concerto entitled "Concerto for Tubameister" which received its piano premier in Vancouver, BC on 26 September 2008 performed by J.c. Sherman, for whom the work was composed. The work received its orchestra premiere with the Winnipeg Symphony, Chris Lee, soloist, in January 2009. Sherman gave the US piano premier in 2010, and the US orchestra premier on 5 October 2014 with the Olympia Symphony.

In 2002, Davies won a Gemini Award for Honour Before Glory.

== See also ==
- Canadian classical music
- Chronological list of Canadian classical composers
- Music of Canada
- List of Canadian composers
