= The Endless Grind =

Canadian comedy anthology television series

The Endless Grind is a Canadian comedy anthology television series, which aired on The Comedy Network in 2001. Created by Greg Lawrence, a producer also known for Kevin Spencer and Butch Patterson: Private Dick, the series was conceived as a set of "short stories" about various characters linked by their shared patronage of a neighbourhood coffee shop; a black comedy which Lawrence described as "a weird hybrid of sketch, sitcom and short film", each segment centred on an incident in the lives of a patron of the coffee shop, such as a couple debating whether to abort the puppies when they discover that their dog is pregnant.

Actors appearing in the series included Sally Clelford, David L. McCallum, Karl Claude, David Elver, Dwayne Hill, Frank McAnulty, Robert Reynolds, Grahame Wood, Norm Berketa, Dawn Ford, L. Dean Ifill, Mark Whitbread, Raoul Bhaneja, Stefan Brogren, Christy Bruce, Fiona Carver, Tracy Dawson, Peter Michael Dillon, Vicki Essex, Marc Hickox, Claudia Jurt, Alyssa Lawrence, Krista Morin, Junior Williams, Mike Beaver, Samantha Bee, James Bradford, Danielle Brett, Bernard Browne, Pina Di Blasi, Jayne Eastwood, Dean Hagopian, Allana Harkin, Jessica Holmes, Albert Howell, Karen Ivany, Jason Jones, Meghanne Kessels, Sheila McCarthy, Mike McPhaden, Duane Murray, John Ng, Rebecca Northan, Peter Oldring and Jonathan Wilson.

The series was shot on the campus of Algonquin College in Ottawa, Ontario.

At the 17th Gemini Awards in 2002, Eastwood was nominated for Best Individual Performance in a Comedy Program or Series and Lawrence was nominated for Best Direction in a Comedy Program or Series. However, Lawrence joked that he had been nominated only so that Made in Canada wouldn't get all the slots in the category. Lawrence also received two Canadian Comedy Award nominations at the 3rd Canadian Comedy Awards, for Best Direction in a Series and Best Direction in a Special Episode.
