= Paragon Entertainment Corporation =

Canadian film and television company

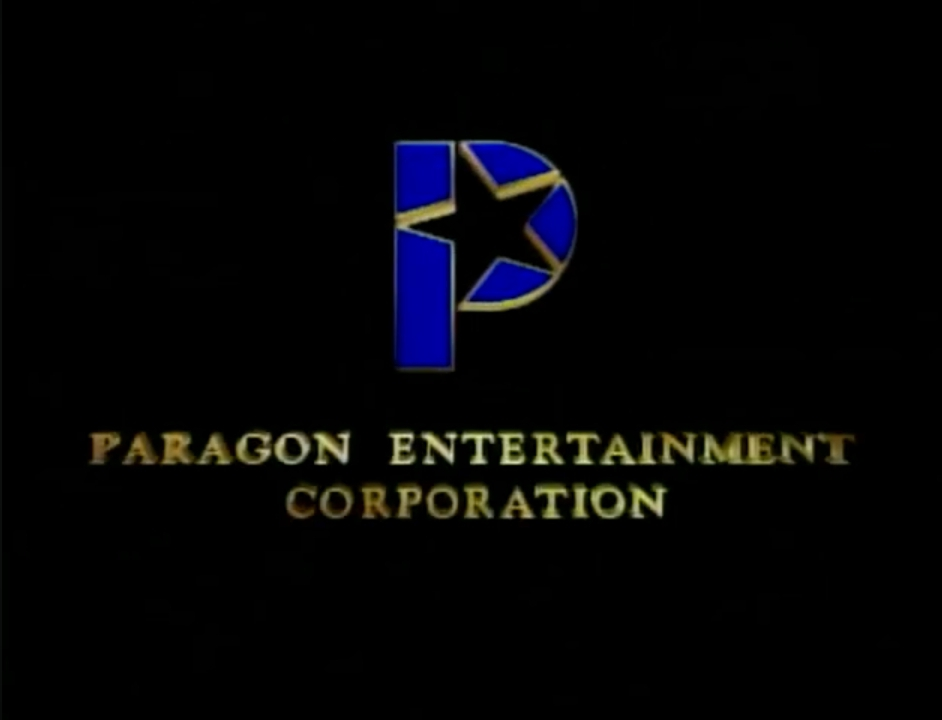
- Paragon Entertainment Corporation Logo (1990 - 1998)
- Formerly: Paragon Motion Pictures
- Type: Public
- Founded: 1977; 49 years ago
- Founder: Jon Slan
- Defunct: 1998; 28 years ago
- Fate: Bankruptcy and Liquidation
- Headquarters: 119 Spadina Avenue, Suite 900, Toronto, Ontario, Canada
- Divisions: Paragon International
- Subsidiaries: Lacewood Productions; Handmade Films

Paragon Entertainment Corporation was a Canadian film and television production company that was formed by Jon Slan in 1977, and declared bankruptcy in 1998.

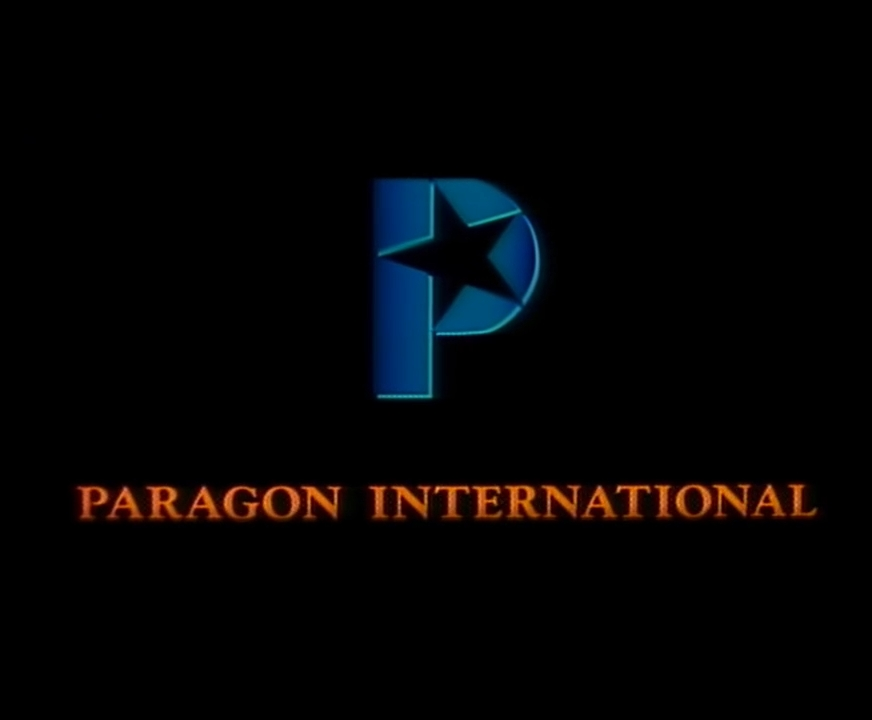
Paragon International Logo (1992 - 1996)

== History ==
In 1977, Jon Slan, who went on to be a founding member of YTV and Superchannel (later Movie Central) founded Paragon Motion Pictures to produce feature films.

After producing a series of feature films, the company entered television production in 1983 with the television series, Philip Marlowe, Private Eye. In the late 1980s, the company had set up Paragon International, headed by Isme Bennie, who represents the Degrassi series.

In 1989, the company became Paragon Entertainment Corporation, while expanding to be a major Canadian studio to compete with the likes of rival TV producers, like Alliance Entertainment Corporation and Atlantis Films, and in 1990, it worked on a pilot for Detective Spot, which later became Dog House.

In 1991, PBS partnered with Paragon Entertainment to revive the long-dormant Lamb Chop franchise, with Shari Lewis returning to host, and helped PBS to syndicate the series to affiliates. The following year, Paragon had lured away CBC producer Carol Reynolds to head up the company to serve as president for Paragon Productions.

In 1993, the company became the first Canadian major film and TV producer to become a public-traded company. In order to keep up with the expansion of the U.S. market, the company hired Gary Randall to head up the company's U.S. TV operations, and hired Julie Lee to set up the company's Vancouver operations.

In 1994, the company had bought out Handmade Films, and its title library. In 1995, the company had bought out animated studio Lacewood Productions for $3.2 million, and two years later, raised its stake to 75%, before taking full control later that year.

In 1998, the company posted a $9 million loss to the company, and as a result, the company went bankrupt. As a result, the company's unit, Handmade Films would become independent, after an aborted buyout by Rubicon was aborted, with backing from Cartier Investments, with The Equator Group took over business.

After Paragon went out of business, Jon Slan had formed a new company Steering Wheel Entertainment in 2003 to produce new projects. The company's library has been sold to Octapixx Worldwide after Paragon went out of business.

== Productions ==
- Journey To Atlantis (1998)

=== Television series ===
- Philip Marlowe, Private Eye (1986)
- Alfred Hitchcock Presents (1987–1989)
- Dog House (1990–1991)
- Beyond Reality (1991–1992)
- Lamb Chop's Play Along (1992–1997)
- Forever Knight (1992–1996)
- Kratts' Creatures (1996–1998)

=== Films ===
- High-Ballin' (1978)
- Fish Hawk (1979)
- Improper Channels (1981)
- Threshold (1981)
- Wyatt Earp (1994)
- Intimate Relations (1996)
- The Wrong Guy (1997)
- The James Gang (1997)
- The Assistant (1997)
- Dinner at Fred's (1997)
- Lock, Stock and Two Smoking Barrels (1998)
- Twice Upon a Yesterday (1998)
- The Secret Laughter of Women (1999)

=== Television movies ===
- An American Christmas Carol (1979)
- The Courage of Kavik, the Wolf Dog (1980)
- Anything to Survive (1990)
- Held Hostage: The Sis and Jerry Levin Story (1991)
- Power Pack (1991)
- A Town Torn Apart (1992)
- Split Images (1992)
- Rapture (1993)
- Sherlock Holmes Returns (1993)
- A Stranger in the Mirror (1993)
- Lamb Chop in the Haunted Studio (1994)
- Lives of Girls and Women (1994)
- Rent-a-Kid (1995)
- Kissinger and Nixon (1995)
- Lamb Chop's Special Chanukah (1995)
- Lives of Girls & Women (1996)
- Frequent Flyer (1996)
- To Brave Alaska (1996)
- The Teddy Bears' Scare (1998)
