= Nova Scotia Teachers College =

College in Truro, Nova Scotia, Canada

Coordinates: 45.3646°N 63.2776°W

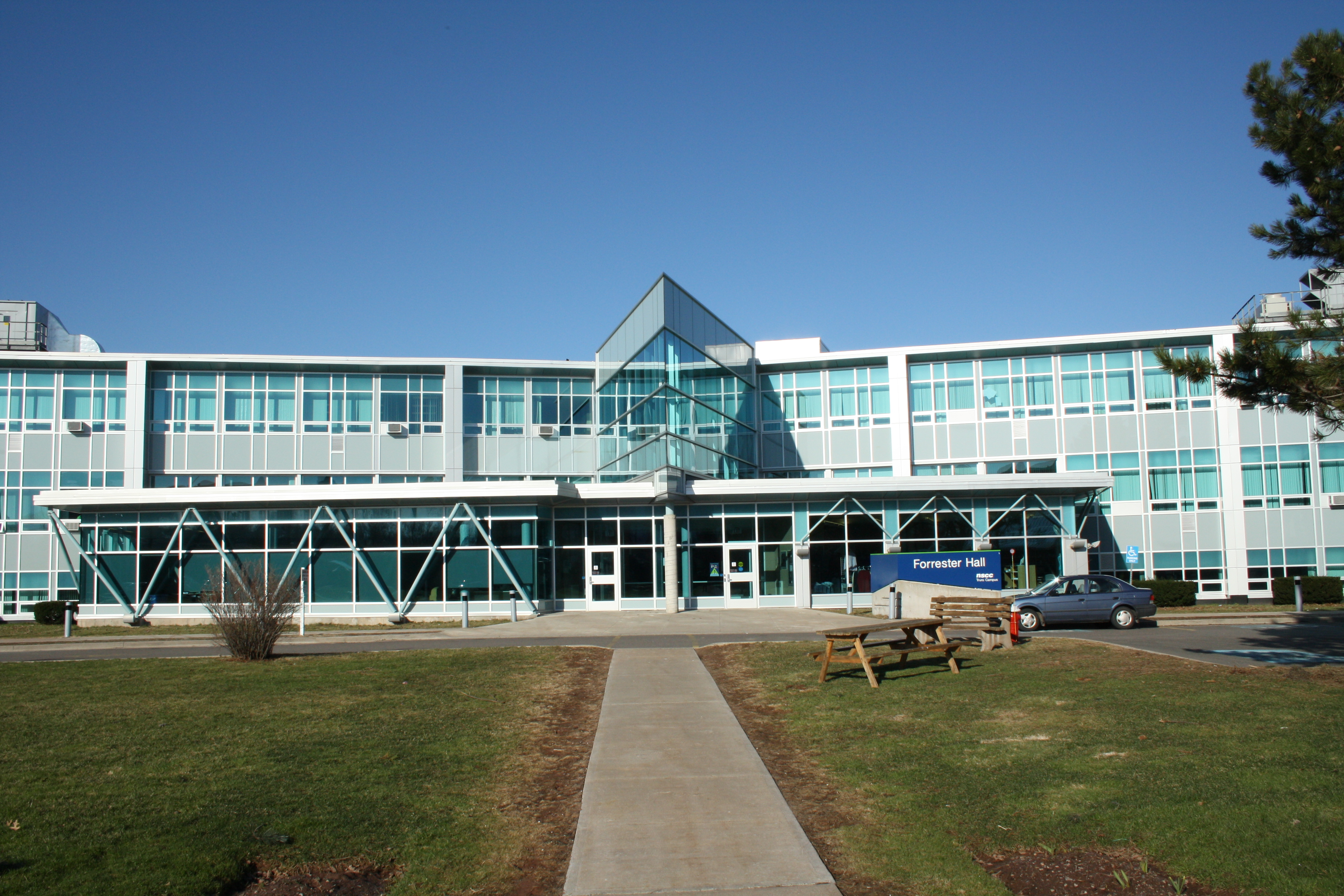
- Forrester Hall at the former Nova Scotia Teachers College campus, displaying post-1997 Nova Scotia Community College signage
- Other name: NSTC
- Former names: Provincial Normal School (1854–1909); Provincial Normal College (1909–1951); Nova Scotia Normal College (1951–1961)
- Type: Teachers' college
- Active: 1854–1997
- Location: Truro, Nova Scotia, Canada
- Language: English

The Nova Scotia Teachers College (NSTC) was a normal school located in the Canadian town of Truro, Nova Scotia.

== History ==
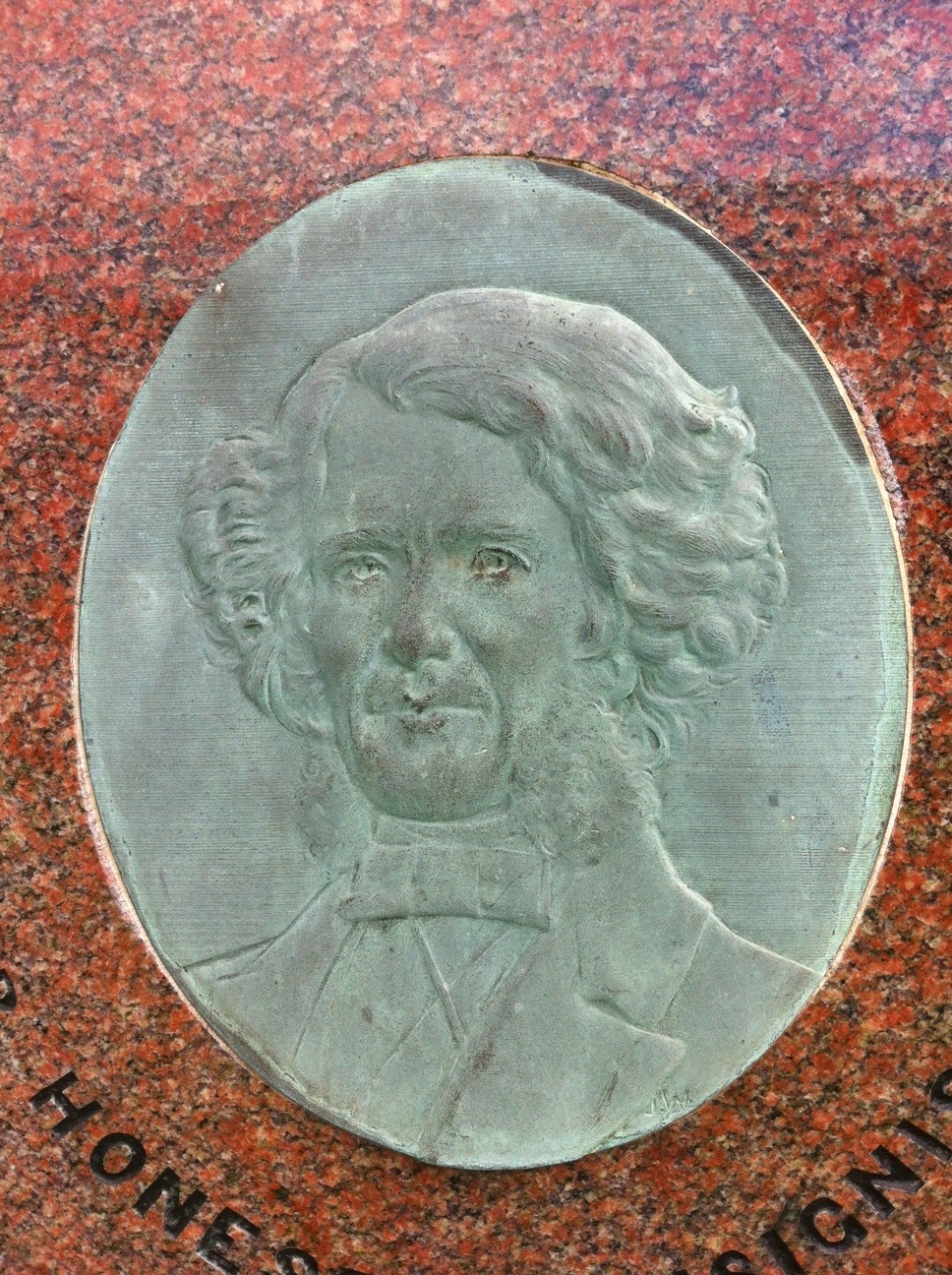
Alexander Forrester by renowned sculptor John Wilson, NSCC, Truro

The Nova Scotia Teachers College was founded as the Provincial Normal School by an act of the Nova Scotia House of Assembly, which received royal assent on March 31, 1854. At its official opening on the "civic square" bordering Prince Street, Forrester Street, Victoria Street, and Young Street, immediately northwest of Truro's downtown core on November 14, 1855, its first principal, Alexander Forrester, described the normal school's objective to be "the training or the qualifying of Teachers for the better and more efficient discharge of the duties of their important office."

In 1857 a model school was opened to provide facilities for teaching practice. In 1878 the original normal school building was replaced, and in 1900 a science building was added to the campus.

In 1909 the name of the Provincial Normal School was changed to the Provincial Normal College; this was changed again in 1951 to the Nova Scotia Normal College, a designation that was retained until 1961. Throughout the years the institution broadened its training and improved the qualifications of its graduates. In 1932 junior matriculation (grade 11) became the minimum entrance requirement, and in 1961 the one-year program was superseded by a two-year program of teacher education beyond Nova Scotia grade 12.

In 1961 the institution was renamed the Nova Scotia Teachers College and moved to a new campus constructed in the town's west end, bordering Arthur Street and Kaulback Street. This campus consisted of an academic building named Forrester Hall, a library and administration building named McCarthy Hall, a sports and recreation centre which was expanded in 1967 with the construction of the Truro Centennial Pool, a residence/dormitory named Davis Hall and a dining facility / cafeteria named Soloan Hall; all named buildings honoured the institution's founders.

From 1972–1989, NSTC offered a three-year integrated program that was originally established on an optional basis, that became the college's basic non-degree program. Graduates from this program were conferred a diploma with the academic title of "Associate in Education of the Nova Scotia Teachers College".

In 1981 an agreement was reached with all Nova Scotia universities offering pre-service teacher education, to offer a joint degree to students completing the AEd (NSTC). The program consisted of five full courses, or thirty semester hours, at the institution of the student's choice and led to the awarding of the Bachelor of Education (BEd) degree jointly by the consenting university and the Nova Scotia Teachers College.

In 1989 the Nova Scotia Teachers College was granted degree-granting status by the Nova Scotia government and the college entered into an affiliation agreement with Mount Saint Vincent University in Halifax which saw NSTC grant a Bachelor of Education degree. The BEd degrees were granted in the name of both institutions to students who successfully completed the four-year NSTC program of studies and read "Nova Scotia Teachers College in association with Mount Saint Vincent University." This became the basic teacher education program of NSTC until the institution's closure.

== Closure ==
In 1994 the NSTC community and its many supporters were shocked by the provincial government's decision to consolidate all education programs offered by Nova Scotian universities. Programs at NSTC, as well as UCCB (now CBU), Dalhousie, and Saint Mary's were identified for closure, with BEd degrees to be offered in Nova Scotia only at St. Francis Xavier, Acadia, Mount St. Vincent, and Sainte-Anne.

In 1997 the last class graduated from the Nova Scotia Teachers College and the Arthur Street campus constructed in 1961 was turned over to the Nova Scotia Community College, becoming their Truro campus.

== Legacy ==
On February 21, 1994 Canada Post issued 'Provincial Normal School, Truro' designed by Raymond Bellemare. The stamp features an image of the Provincial Normal School, an example of the Second Empire style of architecture, which was opened on November 6, 1878. The $2 stamps are perforated 13.5 and were printed by Leigh-Mardon Pty Limited & Canadian Bank Note Company, Limited.

The building was designated Truro Old Normal College National Historic Site by the federal government, on October 4, 2018.

== Restoration of historic Provincial Normal College ==
In September 2008 the actress (and later MLA) Lenore Zann announced a community-led plan to restore the Provincial Normal College building constructed in 1878 on the "civic square" in downtown Truro as an arts and culture centre with possible affiliation with the Nova Scotia Community College. In 2010 the Town of Truro was also reportedly examining the old Provincial Normal College building for restoration as the town's new library.

== Principals ==
- 1855–1869: Alexander Forrester
- 1869–1900: John B. Calkin
- 1900–1928: David S. Soloan
- 1928–1949: David G. Davis
- 1949–1966: Joseph P. McCarthy
- 1966–1969: Clifford Dunphy
- 1969–1972: Verl M. Short
- 1972–1981: A. George MacIntosh
- 1981–1989: Margaret Swan
- 1989–1994: Jamie Muir
- 1994–1997: David White

== Notable alumni ==
- Joyce Barkhouse
- Karen Casey
- Hanson Dowell (1906–2000), president of the Canadian Amateur Hockey Association and member of the Nova Scotia House of Assembly
- Annie Isabella Hamilton
- Alistair MacLeod
- Natalie MacMaster
- Firman McClure
- Eleanor Norrie
- Thomas George Roddick
- Jordan W. Smith

== Notable staff ==
- Theodore Harding Rand (professor of classics)
- J. Chalmers Doane

== See also ==
- John William Dawson
- Second Empire architecture in the United States and Canada
