= Truro-Bible Hill-Millbrook-Salmon River =

Provincial electoral district in Nova Scotia, Canada

Nova Scotia electoral district

Provincial electoral district
- Legislature: Nova Scotia House of Assembly
MLA
Dave Ritcey
Progressive Conservative
- District created: 1978
- First contested: 1978
- Last contested: 2024

Demographics
- Population (2011): 20,144
- Electors: 15,656
- Area (km²): 57
- Pop. density (per km²): 353.4
- Census division: Colchester County
- Census subdivision(s): Colchester, Subd. B, Colchester, Subd. C, Millbrook 27, Truro

Truro-Bible Hill-Millbrook-Salmon River is a provincial electoral district in Nova Scotia, Canada, that elects one member to the Nova Scotia House of Assembly.

The electoral district was created in 1978 and was named Truro-Bible Hill until it was renamed in the 2012 electoral boundary review; there were no boundary changes.

The present name for the electoral district was used beginning with the 2013 provincial election.

== Geography ==
Truro-Bible Hill-Millbrook-Salmon River covers 57 km^{2} (22 sq mi) of land area.

== Members of the Legislative Assembly ==
The electoral district has elected the following members of the Legislative Assembly:

Legislature	Years	Member	Party
Truro-Bible Hill; Riding created from Colchester
52nd	1978–1981	Ron Giffin	Progressive Conservative
53rd	1981–1984	Ron Giffin	Progressive Conservative
54th	1984–1988	Ron Giffin	Progressive Conservative
55th	1988–1993	Ron Giffin	Progressive Conservative
56th	1993–1998	Eleanor Norrie	Liberal
57th	1998–1999	Jamie Muir	Progressive Conservative
58th	1999–2003	Jamie Muir	Progressive Conservative
59th	2003–2005	Jamie Muir	Progressive Conservative
60th	2006–2009	Jamie Muir	Progressive Conservative
61st	2009–2013	Lenore Zann	New Democratic
Truro-Bible Hill-Millbrook-Salmon River
62nd	2013–2017	Lenore Zann	New Democratic
63rd	2017–2019	Lenore Zann	New Democratic
63rd	2019–2019	Lenore Zann	Independent
63rd	2020–2021	Dave Ritcey	Progressive Conservative
64th	2021–2024	Dave Ritcey	Progressive Conservative
65th	2024–present	Dave Ritcey	Progressive Conservative

== Election results ==
=== 2024 ===
2024 Nova Scotia general election
Party	Candidate	Votes	%	±%
Progressive Conservative	Dave Ritcey	4,034	67.76	+19.92
New Democratic	Cailen Pygott	1,067	17.92	+1.30
Liberal	Frank Johnston	852	14.31	-15.89
Total valid votes		5,953		
Total rejected ballots		38		
Turnout		5,994	35.27	
Eligible voters		16,996		
Progressive Conservative hold		Swing		
Source: Elections Nova Scotia

=== 2021 ===
2021 Nova Scotia general election
Party	Candidate	Votes	%	±%	Expenditures
Progressive Conservative	Dave Ritcey	4,025	47.85	-3.55	$47,929.58
Liberal	Tamara Tynes Powell	2,541	30.21	+5.85	$34,982.43
New Democratic	Darlene DeAdder	1,398	16.62	+0.35	$40,088.14
Green	Shaun Trainor	448	5.33	-1.67	$9,331.42
Total valid votes/expense limit		8,412	99.68	–	$94,459.30
Total rejected ballots		27	0.32		
Turnout		8,439	51.11		
Eligible voters		16,510			
Progressive Conservative hold		Swing		-4.70	
Source: Elections Nova Scotia

=== 2020 by-election ===
Nova Scotia provincial by-election, March 10, 2020 Resignation of Lenore Zann
Party	Candidate	Votes	%	±%	Expenditures
Progressive Conservative	Dave Ritcey	2,922	51.40	+19.44	$43,758.75
Liberal	Allan Kennedy	1,385	24.36	+0.27	$36,895.84
New Democratic	Kathleen Kevany	925	16.27	-27.68	$36,318.72
Green	Ivan Drouin	398	7.00	–	$5,285.02
Atlantica	Matthew Rushton	55	0.97	–	$70.00
Total valid votes/Expense limit		5,685	99.61	–	$90,509.74
Total rejected ballots		22	0.39	-0.35	
Turnout		5,707	35.72	-12.71	
Eligible voters		15,975			
Progressive Conservative gain from New Democratic		Swing		+23.56	

=== 2017 ===
2017 Nova Scotia general election
Party	Candidate	Votes	%	±%
New Democratic	Lenore Zann	3,455	43.95	+5.90
Progressive Conservative	Keltie Jones	2,512	31.96	+2.26
Liberal	Craig Johnson	1,894	24.09	-8.15
Total valid votes		7,861	99.27	
Total rejected ballots		58	0.73	-0.05
Turnout		7,919	48.43	-5.45
Eligible voters		16,350		
New Democratic hold		Swing		+1.82
Source: Elections Nova Scotia

=== 2013 ===
2013 Nova Scotia general election
Party	Candidate	Votes	%	±%
New Democratic	Lenore Zann	3,165	38.05	-10.32
Liberal	Barry J. Mellish	2,682	32.25	+17.73
Progressive Conservative	Charles Cox	2,470	29.70	-0.53
Total valid votes		8,317	99.21	
Total rejected ballots		66	0.79	+0.41
Turnout		8,383	53.89	-0.10
Eligible voters		15,557		
New Democratic hold		Swing		-11.52
Source: Elections Nova Scotia; Nova Scotia Legislature (2024). "Electoral History for Truro-Bible Hill-Millbrook-Salmon River" (PDF). nslegislature.ca.

=== 2009 ===
2009 Nova Scotia general election: Truro-Bible Hill
Party	Candidate	Votes	%	±%
New Democratic	Lenore Zann	4,070	48.37	+20.00
Progressive Conservative	Hughie MacIsaac	2,544	30.23	-17.18
Liberal	Bob Hagell	1,643	19.52	-1.93
Green	Kaleigh Brinkhurst	158	1.88	-0.89
Total valid votes		8,415	99.62	
Total rejected ballots		32	0.38	+0.05
Turnout		8,447	53.98	+0.92
Eligible voters		15,647		
New Democratic gain from Progressive Conservative		Swing		+18.39
Source: Nova Scotia Legislature (2024). "Electoral History for Truro-Bible Hill" (PDF). nslegislature.ca.

=== 2006 ===
2006 Nova Scotia general election: Truro-Bible Hill
Party	Candidate	Votes	%	±%
Progressive Conservative	Jamie Muir	3,711	47.41	+0.30
New Democratic	Jim A. Harpell	2,220	28.36	+0.13
Liberal	Ron Chisholm	1,679	21.45	-3.20
Green	Barton Cutten	217	2.77	–
Total valid votes		7,850	99.67	
Total rejected ballots		26	0.33	-0.18
Turnout		7,876	53.06	-4.15
Eligible voters		14,843		
Progressive Conservative hold		Swing		-0.12
Source: Nova Scotia Legislature (2024). "Electoral History for Truro-Bible Hill" (PDF). nslegislature.ca.

=== 2003 ===
2003 Nova Scotia general election: Truro-Bible Hill
Party	Candidate	Votes	%	±%
Progressive Conservative	Jamie Muir	3,862	47.11	-6.47
New Democratic	Jim A. Harpell	2,314	28.23	+0.02
Liberal	Jeff Yuill	2,021	24.66	+6.45
Total valid votes		8,197	99.49	
Total rejected ballots		42	0.51	-0.07
Turnout		8,239	57.21	-7.80
Eligible voters		14,401		
Progressive Conservative hold		Swing		-3.25
Source: Nova Scotia Legislature (2024). "Electoral History for Truro-Bible Hill" (PDF). nslegislature.ca.

=== 1999 ===
1999 Nova Scotia general election: Truro-Bible Hill
Party	Candidate	Votes	%	±%
Progressive Conservative	Jamie Muir	4,747	53.58	+11.55
New Democratic	Ibel Scammell	2,499	28.21	-1.82
Liberal	Matthew Graham	1,613	18.21	-9.73
Total valid votes		8,859	99.42	
Total rejected ballots		52	0.58	+0.18
Turnout		8,911	65.01	+1.42
Eligible voters		13,707		
Progressive Conservative hold		Swing		+6.69
Source: Elections Nova Scotia; Nova Scotia Legislature (2024). "Electoral History for Truro-Bible Hill" (PDF). nslegislature.ca.

=== 1998 ===
1998 Nova Scotia general election: Truro-Bible Hill
Party	Candidate	Votes	%	±%
Progressive Conservative	Jamie Muir	3,852	42.03	+3.67
New Democratic	Ibel Scammell	2,752	30.03	+8.49
Liberal	Eleanor Norrie	2,560	27.94	-12.16
Total valid votes		9,164	99.60	
Total rejected ballots		37	0.40	-0.33
Turnout		9,201	63.60	-9.87
Eligible voters		14,468		
Progressive Conservative gain from Liberal		Swing		+7.92
Source: Nova Scotia Legislature (2024). "Electoral History for Truro-Bible Hill" (PDF). nslegislature.ca.

=== 1993 ===
1993 Nova Scotia general election: Truro-Bible Hill
Party	Candidate	Votes	%	±%
Liberal	Eleanor Norrie	4,321	40.10	+0.80
Progressive Conservative	Jack Coupar	4,134	38.36	-12.07
New Democratic	Rick Bowden	2,321	21.54	+11.27
Total valid votes		10,776	99.27	
Total rejected ballots		79	0.73	-0.31
Turnout		10,855	73.46	+0.86
Eligible voters		14,776		
Liberal gain from Progressive Conservative		Swing		+6.44
Source: Elections Nova Scotia; Nova Scotia Legislature (2024). "Electoral History for Truro-Bible Hill" (PDF). nslegislature.ca.

=== 1988 ===
1988 Nova Scotia general election: Truro-Bible Hill
Party	Candidate	Votes	%	±%
Progressive Conservative	Ron Giffin	4,479	50.43	-10.60
Liberal	Kirby Grant	3,490	39.30	+11.84
New Democratic	Carol Martin	912	10.27	-1.25
Total valid votes		8,881	99.59	
Total rejected ballots		37	0.41	-0.01
Turnout		8,918	72.60	+9.30
Eligible voters		12,283		
Progressive Conservative hold		Swing		-11.22
Source: Elections Nova Scotia; Nova Scotia Legislature (2024). "Electoral History for Truro-Bible Hill" (PDF). nslegislature.ca.

=== 1984 ===
1984 Nova Scotia general election: Truro-Bible Hill
Party	Candidate	Votes	%	±%
Progressive Conservative	Ron Giffin	5,008	61.03	-0.53
Liberal	Kirby Grant	2,253	27.46	+1.76
New Democratic	Andy Belliveau	945	11.52	-1.24
Total valid votes		8,206	99.58	
Total rejected ballots		35	0.42	-0.09
Turnout		8,241	63.30	-5.87
Eligible voters		13,019		
Progressive Conservative hold		Swing		-1.14
Source: Elections Nova Scotia /Nova Scotia Legislature (2024). "Electoral History for Truro-Bible Hill" (PDF). nslegislature.ca.

=== 1981 ===
1981 Nova Scotia general election: Truro-Bible Hill
Party	Candidate	Votes	%	±%
Progressive Conservative	Ron Giffin	5,024	61.55	+6.31
Liberal	Sylvia Roy	2,097	25.69	-11.34
New Democratic	Thomas Barron	1,041	12.75	+5.85
Total valid votes		8,162	99.49	
Total rejected ballots		42	0.51	+0.01
Turnout		8,204	69.17	-5.74
Eligible voters		11,861		
Progressive Conservative hold		Swing		+8.83
Source: Elections Nova Scotia; Nova Scotia Legislature (2024). "Electoral History for Truro-Bible Hill" (PDF). nslegislature.ca.

=== 1978 ===
1978 Nova Scotia general election: Truro-Bible Hill
Party	Candidate	Votes	%
Progressive Conservative	Ron Giffin	4,713	55.24
Liberal	Peter Wilson	3,160	37.04
New Democratic	Thomas Barron	589	6.90
Independent	Bob Kirk	70	0.82
Total valid votes		8,532	99.50
Total rejected ballots		43	0.50
Turnout		8,575	74.90
Eligible voters		11,448	
Source: Elections Nova Scotia; Nova Scotia Legislature (2024). "Electoral History for Truro-Bible Hill" (PDF). nslegislature.ca.

== See also ==
- List of Nova Scotia provincial electoral districts
- Canadian provincial electoral districts
