= Let's Go (1976 TV series) =

Canadian children's television series

- Directed by: Aaron K. Johnston, Gene Packwood
- Presented by: Janis Dunning
- Theme music composer: Chad Allan and Robb Matheson
- Composer: Victor Davies
- Country of origin: Canada
- Original language: English
- No. of episodes: 214

Production
- Executive producer: Rod Webb
- Producers: Aaron K. Johnston, Gene Packwood
- Running time: 30 minutes
- Production companies: Manipro Productions; Moffat Communications

Original release
- Network: CTV
- Release: 1 September 1976 – 1 September 1987

Let's Go is a Canadian children's television series taped at the CKY-TV studios in Winnipeg, Manitoba, Canada. It premiered September 1, 1976 and ran for 214 episodes through 1987.

The series was developed through the Manitoba Theatre Workshop, some of whose students, including Michael Hearn (as Mikey Simpson) were featured in the cast.

Each 30-minute episode starred host Janis Dunning (who would play Jennifer on The Rockets in 1987–1991) and a rotating cast of five children. Alumni include actor Scott Bairstow, former Shooting Star Theatre, NYC owner Scott Witty, film director Noam Gonick, Aqua Books owner Kelly Hughes, and singer-songwriter Chantal Kreviazuk. Skits were written and performed by Janis and the kids. Songs were pre-recorded at 21st Century Sound in Winnipeg, and later lipsynched by the cast.

The music on the program was written by Victor Davies, who for Let's Go and The Rockets (Dunning's next project) wrote more than 600 songs. The theme was co-written and performed by Chad Allan.

This program was broadcast throughout Canada on CTV and ATV.
