= Lenore Zann =

Canadian actress and politician (born 1959)

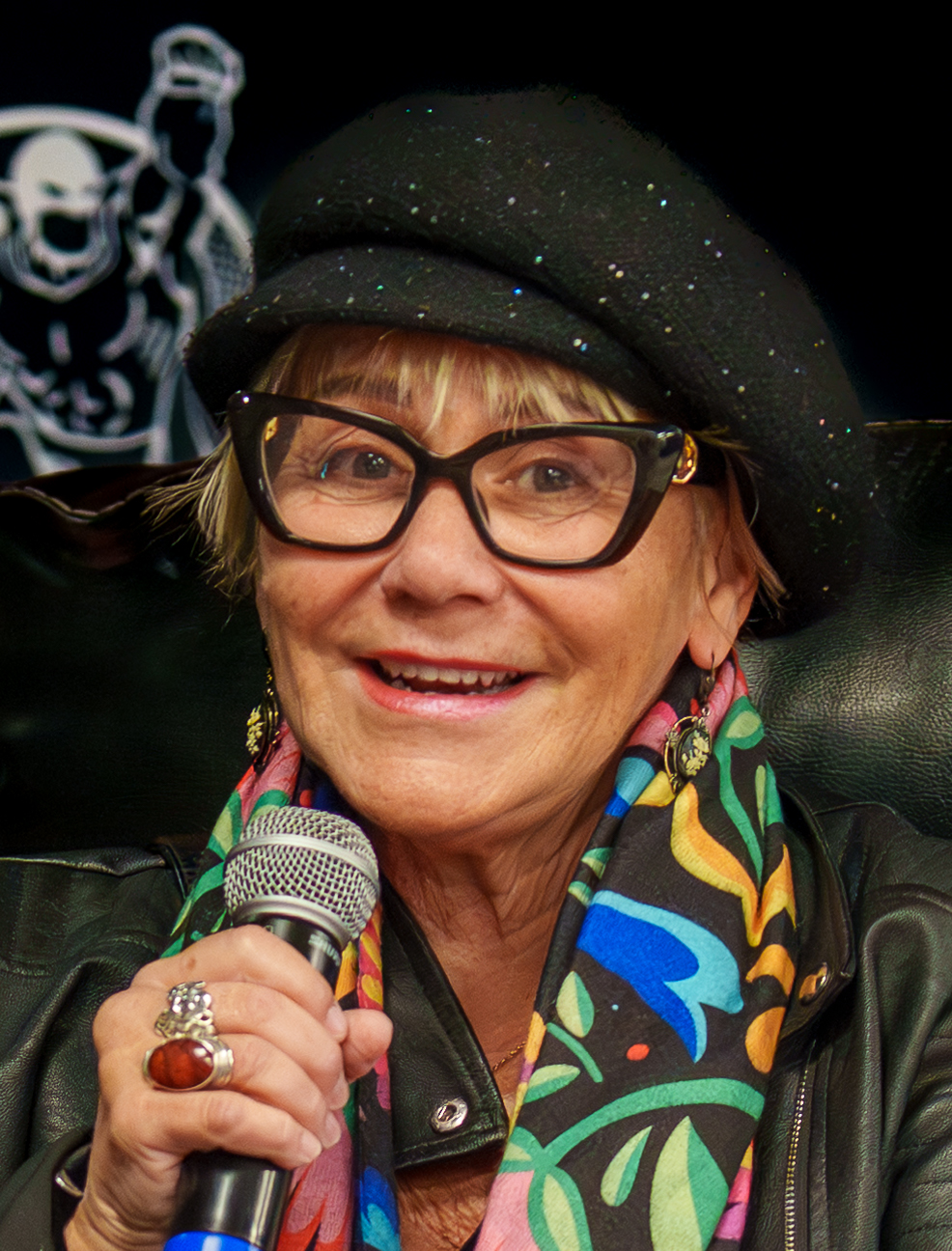
- Zann at Big Lick Comic Con in Roanoke, Virginia in 2026

Member of Parliament for Cumberland—Colchester
- In office October 21, 2019 – August 15, 2021
- Preceded by: Bill Casey
- Succeeded by: Stephen Ellis

Member of the Nova Scotia House of Assembly for Truro-Bible Hill-Millbrook-Salmon River (Truro-Bible Hill; 2009–2013)
- In office June 9, 2009 – September 12, 2019
- Preceded by: Jamie Muir
- Succeeded by: Dave Ritcey

Personal details
- Born: November 22, 1959 (age 67) Sydney, New South Wales, Australia
- Party: Liberal (since 2019); New Democrat (until 2019)
- Height: 5 ft 4 in (1.6 m)
- Spouses: Ralph Dillon (m. 1987; div. 1994); Dennis Keaveney (m. 1998; div. 2002)
- Education: York University
- Occupation: Actress
- Website: lenorezann.libparl.ca

Lenore Zann (born November 22, 1959) is a Canadian actress and politician. She represented Truro-Bible Hill district in the Nova Scotia House of Assembly from 2009 until 2019 as a New Democrat, and then represented Cumberland—Colchester in the Canadian House of Commons from 2019 to 2021 as a Liberal. As an actress, Zann is known for providing the voice of Rogue in various X-Men series and games.

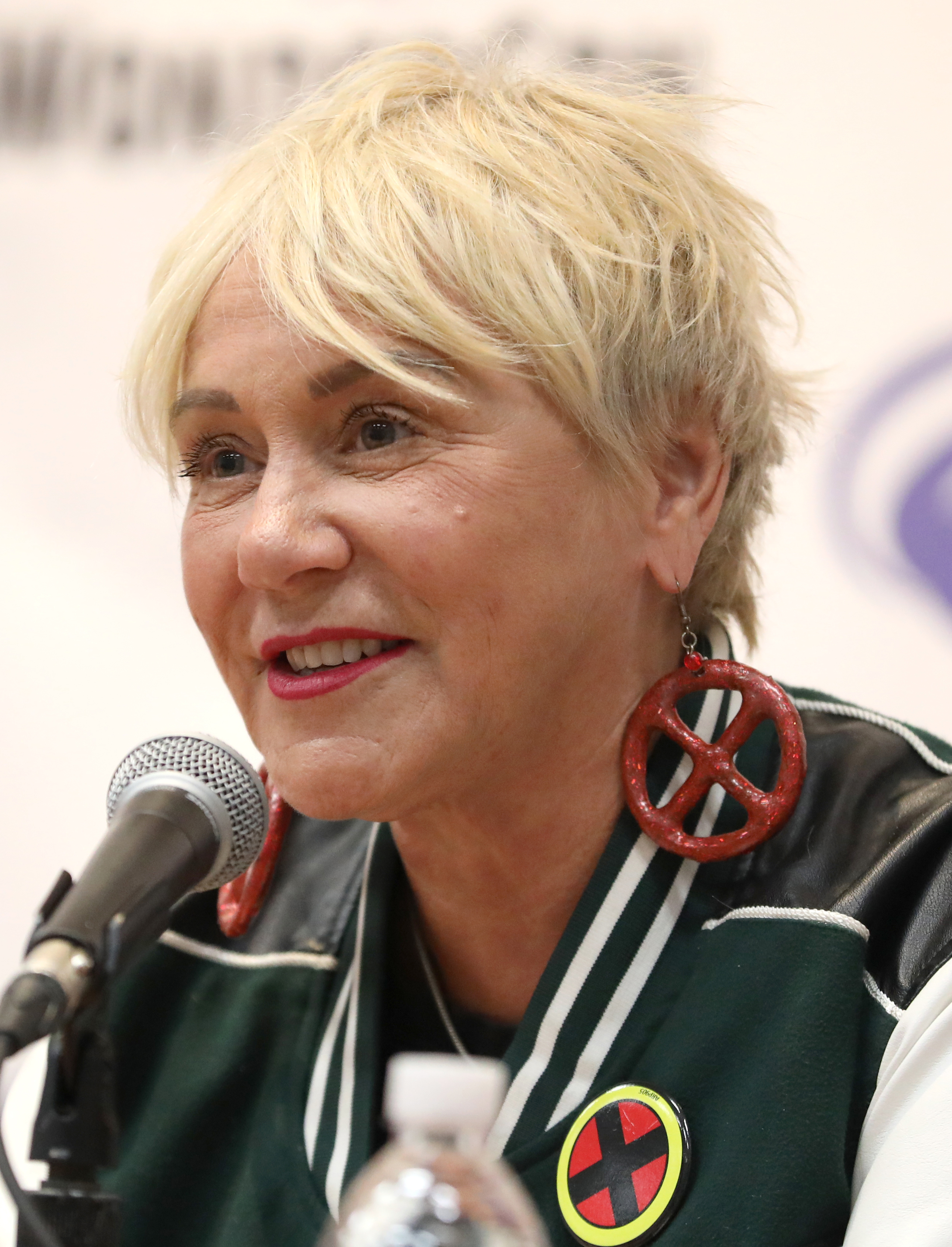
Zann at WonderCon

== Life and career ==
Zann was born on November 22, 1959, in Sydney, New South Wales, Australia, the daughter of Janice, a high school teacher, and Paul Zann, a professor. Her great-grandfather, named Zaninovich (Zaninović), came to Australia from Croatia.

She emigrated with her parents to Canada in 1968, first to Regina, Saskatchewan, then to Truro, Nova Scotia, and later graduated from Cobequid Educational Centre, a high school in Truro, which was noted for its student musical productions. She attended York University in Toronto where she studied drama, fine arts and political science.

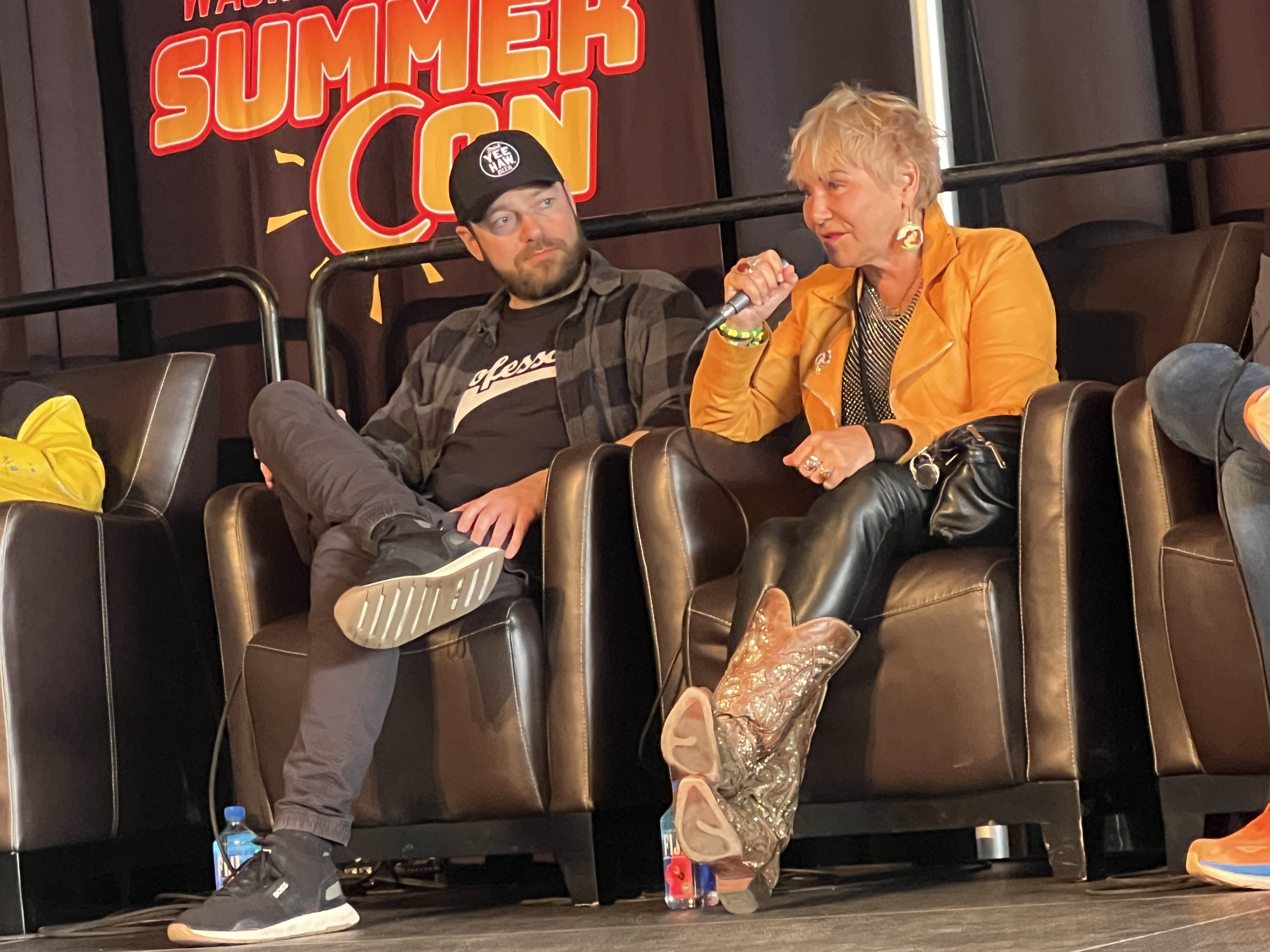
Lenore Zann speaks as fellow actor Ross Marquand listens at a convention in Washington state on June 22, 2025.

Zann worked as a screen, television, stage, and voice actress, and appeared in numerous television shows, films, radio, and animated series. As an actor, she is best known for providing the voice of Rogue in X-Men: The Animated Series (1992-1997), as well as the video games X-Men vs. Street Fighter (1996), Marvel vs. Capcom: Clash of Super Heroes (1998), and Marvel vs. Capcom 2: New Age of Heroes (2000). Zann reprised the role in X-Men '97, the Disney+ revival of The Animated Series.

After living in Halifax, Toronto, London, Stockholm, Vancouver, Los Angeles, and New York City, Zann returned to Truro in 2008.

In 2008 she started a community campaign to restore a historic former academic building in downtown Truro, Provincial Normal College, into a cultural centre. She raised $62,000 for a feasibility study following which the four-story, 24,000-square-foot provincially designated Victorian brick building was repurposed to become the centre point of downtown Truro – the town's new Central Colchester Regional Library, with a skating rink in front during winter months.

== Political career ==
=== Provincial politics ===
She represented Truro-Bible Hill district in the Nova Scotia House of Assembly from 2009 until 2019 as a member of the Nova Scotia New Democratic Party and from June 9, 2019, until September 12, 2019, as an independent.

On April 8, 2009, Zann won the Nova Scotia New Democratic Party nomination in the riding of Truro-Bible Hill in anticipation of the 2009 provincial election. On the same day, an employee of the Liberal Party leaked a topless photo of her to the media from her appearance in The L Word. Zann was elected in the 2009 provincial election. and served as the ministerial assistant for the Department of Tourism, Culture, and Heritage.

During her first four years as a backbencher in the first NDP government in Nova Scotia, Zann was appointed ministerial assistant for three positions: culture & heritage, environment & climate change, and deputy premier – unsuccessfully working to reinstate the Nova Scotia Arts Council and improve the film tax credit for the film and TV industry.

As a first-time opposition member, Zann has been NDP spokesperson for education, environment, status of women, Human Rights Commission, Aboriginal affairs & truth & reconciliation, agriculture, advanced education, African NS affairs, and Gaelic affairs.

During her ten years as MLA, she introduced two successful bills. Bill 90 amended the Nova Scotia Provincial Exhibition Commission Act to increase the size of the board of directors to ten. Bill 74 changed the name of the new electoral district of Truro–Bible Hill to Truro–Bible Hill–Millbrook–Salmon River.

She was subsequently re-elected in the 2013 provincial election to represent the reconfigured electoral district, now called Truro-Bible Hill-Millbrook-Salmon River.

In that election, the NDP was reduced to seven seats in the legislature and third-party status. Zann served as the NDP critic for Aboriginal affairs, community culture and heritage, community services, education, Human Rights Commission / status of women, and seniors and disabled.

Zann introduced bill 111, the Environmental Racism Prevention Act, addressing the issue of environmental racism in Nova Scotia. The bill was not considered by the house.

On June 12, 2015, Zann announced her bid for the leadership of the Nova Scotia New Democratic Party. On February 27, 2016, Zann was defeated in her leadership bid, losing to Gary Burrill on the second ballot.

She sat as an independent member in Nova Scotia's legislature as she sought the nomination for the 2019 federal election.

=== Federal politics ===
She served as a Liberal in the 43rd Canadian Parliament, after winning the Cumberland—Colchester seat in the 2019 federal election.

On June 9, 2019, Zann announced she would seek the Liberal nomination to succeed retiring Liberal MP Bill Casey in Cumberland—Colchester for the 2019 federal election. She chose to leave the NDP for the Liberals because she believed the Liberals stood a better chance of winning. She sat as an independent member in Nova Scotia's legislature as she sought the nomination. Zann won the federal Liberal nomination on July 27, 2019, defeating three other candidates including Casey's constituency assistant.

She resigned her provincial seat on September 12.

She was elected to serve as the Cumberland-Colchester MP in October 2019.

She introduced one private member bill, Bill C-230, An Act respecting the development of a national strategy to redress environmental racism which sought to require the Minister of the Environment to develop a national strategy that would examine the link between race, socio-economic status and environmental risk. It was brought to a vote on March 24, 2021, and advanced to committee stage with Liberal, NDP and Green Party members voting in favour. However, the Parliament ended before the bill was brought up for a third reading.

In the 2021 federal election Zann lost her seat to Conservative candidate Stephen Ellis.

== Electoral record ==
=== Federal ===
2021 Canadian federal election: Cumberland—Colchester
Party	Candidate	Votes	%	±%	Expenditures
Conservative	Stephen Ellis	18,601	46.02	+10.34	$74,420.53
Liberal	Lenore Zann	13,822	34.20	-2.48	$83,751.17
New Democratic	Daniel Osborne	4,984	12.33	+0.34	$3,375.10
People's	Bill Archer	1,687	4.17	+2.84	$1,941.16
Green	Jillian Foster	1,045	2.59	-10.65	$813.26
Independent	Jody O'Blenis	278	0.69	+0.37	none listed
Total valid votes/expense limit		40,417	99.31		$109,531.81
Total rejected ballots		279	0.69	-0.29	
Turnout		40,696	60.05	-8.48	
Registered voters		67,768			
Conservative gain from Liberal		Swing		+6.41	
Source: Elections Canada

2019 Canadian federal election: Cumberland—Colchester
Party	Candidate	Votes	%	±%	Expenditures
Liberal	Lenore Zann	16,672	36.68	−27.05	$91,456.57
Conservative	Scott Armstrong	16,219	35.69	+9.23	none listed
Green	Jason Blanch	6,015	13.23	+9.67	$9,366.06
New Democratic	Larry Duchesne	5,451	11.99	+6.28	$3,860.15
People's	William Archer	608	1.34	New	none listed
Independent	Matthew V. Rushton	232	0.51	New	none listed
Veterans Coalition	Jody O'Blenis	144	0.32	New	none listed
National Citizens Alliance	Stephen J. Garvey	109	0.24	New	none listed
Total valid votes/expense limit		45,450	99.03		$104,050.86
Total rejected ballots		447	0.97	+0.59	
Turnout		45,897	68.54	−2.51	
Eligible voters		66,967			
Liberal hold		Swing		−18.14	
Source: Elections Canada

=== Provincial ===
2017 Nova Scotia general election
Party	Candidate	Votes	%	±%
New Democratic Party	Lenore Zann	3,455	43.95	
Progressive Conservative	Keltie Jones	2,512	31.96	
Liberal	Craig Johnson	1,894	24.09	

2013 Nova Scotia general election
Party	Candidate	Votes	%	±%
New Democratic Party	Lenore Zann	3,165	38.10	
Liberal	Barry J. Mellish	2,682	32.20	
Progressive Conservative	Charles Cox	2,470	29.70	

2009 Nova Scotia general election
Party	Candidate	Votes	%	±%
New Democratic Party	Lenore Zann	4,147	48.40	
Progressive Conservative	Hughie MacIsaac	2,607	30.42	
Liberal	Bob Hagell	1,651	19.27	
Green	Kaleigh Brinkhurst	164	1.91	–

== Filmography ==
=== Film (live-action) ===
Year	Film	Role	Notes
1980	Hounds of Notre Dame	Lila Petrie	
1981	Happy Birthday to Me	Maggie	
1981	Black Mirror	Julie	
1982	Visiting Hours	Lisa	
1982	Murder by Phone	Connie Lawson	
1983	American Nightmare	Tina	
1984	That's My Baby!	Sally	
1985	Def-Con 4	J.J.	
1985	Return	Susan	
1986	One Night Only	Anne McGraw	
1987	Prettykill	Carrie	
1987	The Girl	Viveka	
1988	Something About Love	Sylvia	
1989	The Amityville Curse	Unknown	Direct-to-video
1990	Back Stab	Unknown	
1993	Change of Heart	Carmen	
1994	Boozecan	Sunny	
1994	Cold Sweat	Ghost	
1995	Johnston... Johnston	Queen Bee	Short film
1996	Natural Enemy	Gina Knox	Direct-to-video
1998	Babyface	Margaret	
2007	Dirty Laundry	Linda	Short film
2008	Favorite Son	Unknown	
2010	Trigger	Beebee	
2014	Becoming Marilyn!	Herself	Documentary
2020	Stage Mother	Bevette	

=== Film (animated) ===
Year	Title	Role	Note
1991	Tooth Fairy, Where Are You?	Dottie	Television film
1999	Makai Tenshô: The Armageddon	Queen Kasuga	
2003	Rescue Heroes: The Movie	Wendy Waters	
2005	My Little Pony: Friends are Never Far Away	Star Catcher	Direct-to-video
2005	My Little Pony: A Very Minty Christmas	Star Catcher	Short film
2012	Bratz: Desert Jewelz	Alia	

=== Television (live action) ===
Year	Title	Role	Notes
1982	Something's Afoot	Hope	Television film
1986	Mania: The Intruder	Julie Somers	Television film
1989	Rin Tin Tin: K-9 Cop	Unknown	Episode: "Jail Bait"
1989	Love and Hate: The Story of Colin and JoAnn Thatcher	Lynne	Television film
1989	Last Train Home	Lily Manse	Television film
1990	On Thin Ice: The Tai Babilonia Story	Unknown	Television film
1991	Conspiracy of Silence	Soap Actress #1	Miniseries
1992	Teamster Boss: The Jackie Presser Story	Betty	Television film
1992	Beyond Reality	Diane	Episode: "Theatre of the Absurd"
1993	Gross Misconduct: The Life of Brian Spencer	Diane Delana	Television film
1993	The Hidden Room	Amy	Episode: "Transfigured Night"
1990–1993	Street Legal	Nina Pascaras / Jean Rhomer	Recurring role; 8 episodes
1994	RoboCop	Willa	Episode: "Sisters in Crime"
1994	Forever Knight	Amber	Episode: "Capital Offence"
1995	Rent-a-Kid	Elaine Loman	Television film
1996	Ed McBain's 87th Precinct: Ice	Angie	Television film
1996	Millennium	Ruthie Bangs	Episode: "The Well-Worn Lock"
1997	Police Academy: The Series	Bonnie	Episode: "Shopping with the Enemy"
1999	Lexx	The Dark Lady	Episode: "Woz"
1999	Pit Pony	L.B. Collins	Episode: "Famous"
2000	Personally Yours	Josie	TV movie
2001	Cold Squad	Laurie Peters	Episode: "The Box"
2001	Mysterious Ways	Beverly Wilcox	Episode: "A Time to Every Purpose"
2003	Andromeda	Senator Bayliss	Episode: "The Risk-All Point"
2004	Law & Order	Tina	Episode: "Veteran's Day"
2004	Kingdom Hospital	Harriet	2 episodes
2004	The Chris Isaak Show	Sharon Nesbick	Episode: "Suspicion"
2006	'Til Death Do Us Part	Nancy Seaman	Episode: "Pilot"
2007	Love Notes	Merry	Television film
2008	The L Word	Jackie	Episode: "Look Out, Here They Come!"

=== Television (animated) ===
Year	Title	Role	Notes
1992–1997	X-Men: The Animated Series	Rogue	Main role; 68 episodes
1993	Stunt Dawgs	Sizzle	
1993–1994	Cadillacs and Dinosaurs	Mikla	Main role; 13 episodes
1995	Spider-Man: The Animated Series	Rogue	2 episodes
1996	Vor-Tech: Undercover Conversion Squad	Unknown	Credited as Lenore Zahn
1998	Salty's Lighthouse	Aurora / Sunshine / Little Ditcher	
1998	Mythic Warriors	Persephone	Episode: "Persephone and the Winter Seeds"
1999	Arc the Lad	Announcer / Kids	
1999–2000	Avengers: United They Stand	Tigra	Main role; 13 episodes
1999–2002	Rescue Heroes	Wendy Waters	Main role; 32 episodes
1999	Dual! Parallel Trouble Adventure	Alice Sharome	Recurring role
1999	Magic Knight Rayearth	Caldina	Recurring role; English dub
2000	Gate Keepers	Satoko Takanashi	
2000	Dinozaurs	Dino Ptera	Recurring role
2000	Capertown Cops	Unknown	Recurring role; credited as Lenore Zahn
2000	Turtle Island	Ingrid and Wormy	
2001	Outlaw Star	Aisha Clan-Clan	English dub
2001	Mobile Suit Gundam	Crowley Hamon	English dub
2001	Alienators: Evolution Continues	Additional Voices	
2001–2002	Mary-Kate & Ashley in Action!	Renee La Rouge	Recurring role; 6 episodes
2001–2005	Dragon Tales	Lorca, Quanita and Isabella	12 episodes
2003–2004	MegaMan: NT Warrior	Roll	Recurring role
2003	The Mummy	Anck Su Namun	4 episodes
2003	Totally Spies	Ariel	
2004–2006	Dragon Booster	Kitt Wonn, Spynn	Recurring role; 39 episodes
2006–2008	Teenage Mutant Ninja Turtles	Chikara Shisho	Recurring role; 10 episodes
2007	Serial Experiments Lain	Reika	
2007–2009	Storm Hawks	Master Cyclonis, Oracle, Lark, Statue, Marge	Recurring role; 8 episodes
2008–2011	Animal Mechanicals	Island Owl	Recurring role; 73 episodes
2009–2011	WordWorld	Bear, Kangaroo, and Tiger (Season 1)	Main role
2024–present	X-Men '97	Rogue	Main role; 13 episodes

=== Video games ===
Year	Title	Voice role	Notes	Source
1996	X-Men vs. Street Fighter	Rogue / Birdy		
1998	Marvel vs. Capcom: Clash of Super Heroes	Rogue		
2000	The Misadventures of Tron Bonne	Digger		
2000	Marvel vs. Capcom 2: New Age of Heroes	Rogue / Birdy	Uncredited	
2004	The Fairly OddParents: Shadow Showdown	Titania		
2025	Marvel Rivals	Rogue		
