= Paul Schibli =

Canadian artist

- Born: Paul D. Schibli; Montreal, Quebec, Canada
- Occupations: Animator, storyboard artist, director, painter

Paul D. Schibli is a Canadian animator, storyboard artist, director and painter. He directed The Raccoons series as well as the feature film The Nutcracker Prince. Schibli wrote and illustrated the children's book Monsters Don't Count. He is an oil painter who has done floral work and landscapes.

== Works ==
=== Director ===
- The Christmas Raccoons (1980)
- The Raccoons (1987–1988)
- The Nutcracker Prince (1990)
- Tooth Fairy, Where Are You? (1991)
- The Teddy Bears' Christmas (1992)
- I Yabba-Dabba Do! (1993 - supervising director: overseas)
- All Dogs Go to Heaven 2 (1996 - sequence director)
- The Secret World of Og (2006)

=== Art Department ===
- The Raccoons: Let's Dance! (1984 - designer)
- The Care Bears Battle the Freeze Machine (1984 - storyboard artist)
- The Nutcracker Prince (1990 - storyboard artist)
- Tooth Fairy, Where Are You? (1991 - designer, storyboard artist)
- The Teddy Bears' Christmas (1992 - storyboard artist)
- Problem Child (1994 - storyboard artist)
- The Busy World of Richard Scarry (1996 - storyboard artist)
- The Little Lulu Show (1996 - storyboard artist)

=== Animation ===
- Wait Till Your Father Gets Home (1973 – animator, layout artist)
- The Happy Prince (1974 – animator)
- The Little Brown Burro (1978 – animator)
- The Christmas Raccoons (1980 – animation designer, animation director)
- The Raccoons on Ice (1981 - designer, animation director, character designer, original characters)
- The Raccoons and the Lost Star (1982 - designer, animation director, character designer, original characters)
- The Raccoons: Let's Dance! (1983 - animator, animation director, layout artist)
- The Care Bears Battle the Freeze Machine (1984 - animation director)
- The Nutcracker Prince (1990 - character designer)
- The Raccoons (1989-1991 - original animation design)
- Tooth Fairy, Where Are You? (1991 - animation layout artist)
- The Teddy Bears' Christmas (1992 - animation layout artist, character designer)
- The Town Santa Forgot (1993 - overseas animation director)
- Hollyrock-a-Bye Baby (1993 - overseas animation director)

=== Others ===
- The Country Mouse and the City Mouse Adventures (1998–1999; character adaptation)
