= The Railway Dragon =

- Created by: Patrick Granleese
- Written by: Patrick Granleese; Derek Diorio
- Directed by: Hilary Phillips; Gerald Tripp
- Voices of: Tracey Moore; Barry Morse
- Narrated by: Leslie Nielsen
- Music by: Edmund Eagan
- Country of origin: Canada
- Original language: English

Production
- Executive producer: Sheldon S. Wiseman
- Producer: Gerald Tripp
- Editor: Carla Densmore
- Production companies: Lacewood Productions; Hinton Animation Studios

Original release
- Network: CTV Television Network
- Release: December 31, 1988

Related
- The Birthday Dragon

The Railway Dragon is a 1989 Canadian television animated film. Leslie Nielsen featured as the narrator. The half-hour special premiered in the US on the Disney Channel.

== Plot ==
A little girl named Emily knows that there is something special in the railway tunnel close to her home, despite no one else thinking so. One day she decides to see for herself, exploring around the tunnel. After a brief scare due to a large rat, she tries to give it some food but the rat instead runs down a burrow. Emily accidentally slides down the burrow while investigating it and is amazed when she comes face to face with a centuries-old dragon. The dragon is at first grouchy and not happy with her been in his lair, which is full of 'treasure', although this is mainly discarded items from the trains. As the two talk more, they begin to become friends. Later, the dragon reveals there were once many other dragons long ago but there are now only a few left as they were hunted down by humans, as humans feared dragons because of their size. He also reveals that it is the 'Day of Tidings', a secret celebration for dragons, but that he will not be going as it is too dangerous to travel and that the Tidings are too far away. Emily, however, convinces him to go to the Tidings, with the dragon agreeing and also stating he will take Emily with him, much to her delight. However, she then realizes that she missed her dinner with her grandmother. Although she leaves, she agrees to meet the dragon at the mouth of the tunnel at moonrise so they can go together.

Upon returning home, Emily is sent to her room, although she later sneaks out and meets the dragon on top of the railway tunnel, although he states they won't be flying when there are 'better ways'. A few moments later, the pair jump off the tunnel and begin to ride on the roof of a train, with Emily going inside and getting some smoked meat sandwiches for the Dragon (due to him saying earlier there was nothing he savoured more than smoked meat, with him hating the new diesel trains making the meat taste like paraffin). Emily encounters the train's conductor but the Dragon distracts him, allowing both the Dragon and Emily to escape.

After hiding from two hunters (a father and son) and their bloodhounds, the pair continue on foot while continuing conversation. They soon reach the location, with the Dragon convincing the others (who have hidden because of being spooked by Emily) to show themselves, showing Emily how to shout tidings. Both Emily and the Dragons have a fun time playing various party games, dancing and eating popcorn. Later, Emily convinces the old dragon to fly after watching one of the other dragons flying, with him taking her for a fun ride in the sky despite having not flown for 100 years. With storm clouds approaching, the pair head for home. However, the dragon is shot in the wing by the hunters and crashes outside the railway tunnel, knocking Emily unconscious. Putting her out of harm's way, the Dragon scares off the hunters and their dogs before slumping down against the tunnel wall and seemingly disappearing.

Emily's father finds her later on and brings her home. In the days that follow, she fails to convince them of the dragon's existence because of the incident. Soon after, Emily searches the tunnel and the dragon's lair but is sad when she cannot find him, even after shouting tidings numerous times. However, the dragon re-appears (after using the camouflage trick the other dragons used with the trees earlier) and the two friends share a hug, with the narrator stating that it doesn't matter what others think, as things are true, if they are true in our hearts.

== Cast ==
- Chuck Collins as Dragon #1 / Hunter
- Noel Counsil as Father / Conductor
- Rick Jones as French Chef / Hunter's Son
- Tracey Moore as Emily
- Barry Morse as The Railway Dragon
- Leslie Nielsen as Narrator
- Beverley Wolfe as Mother

== Sequel ==
A sequel to the film, called The Birthday Dragon, was broadcast on television in 1992 before been released on VHS in 1993 by Family Home Entertainment. Tracey Moore and Barry Morse were the only ones who reprised their roles for the film.
