= Tracey Moore (actress) =

Canadian voice, television and film actress and voice director (born 1960)

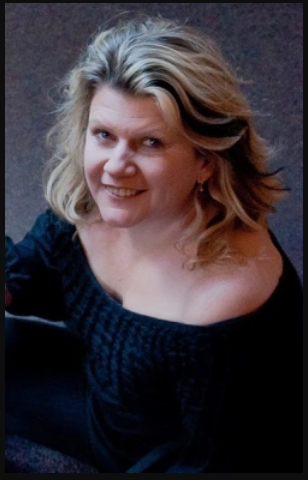
- Born: January 17, 1960 (age 66); Calgary, Alberta, Canada
- Occupations: Voice, television and film actress; voice director
- Years active: 1985–present
- Children: 1
- Website: https://kre8studio.com/

Tracey Moore (born January 17, 1960) is a Canadian voice, television and film actress and voice director. She is most noted as the voice of Princess Toadstool in The Adventures of Super Mario Bros. 3 and Super Mario World, and the singing voice of Strawberry Shortcake in Strawberry Shortcake's Berry Bitty Adventures.

She began her career primarily in musical theatre roles, most notably playing Anne Shirley in productions of Anne of Green Gables: The Musical in the 1980s. She has also had occasional live-action film roles, most notably in the 1990 film Defy Gravity; she was a Genie Award nominee for Best Supporting Actress at the 13th Genie Awards in 1992.

Moore was also briefly the voice of Serena/Sailor Moon in the North American version of the anime Sailor Moon for 13 nonconsecutive episodes (before Terri Hawkes was the established voice for the titular character) as well as the voices of Marvel characters in X-Men: The Animated Series, the Dryad in Anne of Green Gables: The Animated Series, the titular character in George Shrinks, and Ned Flemkin in Ned's Newt.

Moore toured in the United States playing Dorothy opposite Phyllis Diller's Wicked Witch of the West in The Wizard of Oz. She resides in Victoria, British Columbia, with her daughter.

== Filmography ==
=== Film ===
Year	Title	Role	Notes
1987	The Care Bears Adventure in Wonderland	Alice	
1988	Care Bears Nutcracker Suite	Hugs	direct to video
1989	The Teddy Bears' Picnic	Doc	direct to video
1994	Highlander: The Adventure Begins	Quentin's Mother	
1995	Highlander: The Last of the MacLeods	Female Favellan	
2006	My Little Pony: A Very Pony Place	Cheerilee	Also, Tracey performed the songs "Positively Pink" and "Get the Giggles"
2007	Care Bears: Oopsy Does It!	Share Bear	
2009	My Little Pony: Twinkle Wish Adventure	Narrator/Mayor/Announcer	direct to video
2010	Strawberry Shortcake: The Berryfest Princess	Strawberry Shortcake (singing)	direct to video
2010	Care Bears: Share Bear Shines	Share Bear	
2010	Care Bears: The Giving Festival Movie	Share Bear	
2010	Strawberry Shortcake: The Glimmerberry Ball Movie	Strawberry Shortcake (singing)	direct to video
2010	Care Bears to the Rescue	Share Bear	
2014	Strawberry Shortcake: Berry Best Friends	Strawberry Shortcake (singing)	direct to video

=== Television ===
Year	Title	Role	Notes
1987	Beverly Hills Teens	Various including Larke Tanner and Bianca Dupree	
1987	My Pet Monster	Princess	
1987–1988	The Care Bears Family	Cheer Bear, Shreeky & Baby Hugs	main role; 33 episodes
1989	The Railway Dragon	Emily	TV movie
1989	The Teddy Bears' Picnic	Doc	TV movie
1990	The Adventures of Super Mario Bros. 3	Princess Toadstool	Main role; 26 episodes
1991	Super Mario World	Princess Toadstool	Main role; 13 episodes
1991	The Tale of Peter Rabbit	Mopsy/Sparrow	TV movie; credited as Tracy Moore
1991	Rupert	Additional Voices, Rika	recurring roles; 13 episodes
1992	The Birthday Dragon	Emily	TV movie
1992	X-Men	Emma Frost / White Queen, Dark Phoenix	recurring roles
1994	Tales from the Cryptkeeper		(1 episode); "Cold Blood, Warm Heart/The Spider & the Flies
1994	Highlander: The Animated Series	Ave	(2 episodes); "The Last of the MacLeods", "A Taste of Betrayal"
1994–1997	The Busy World of Richard Scarry		recurring role; 39 episodes
1995	Sailor Moon	Sailor Moon (Serena)/Doom 'n' Gloom Girl	main role; 14 episodes; also the voice director for 11 episodes.
1997–2000	Ned's Newt	Ned Flemkin	main role
1997–1998	The Adventures of Sam & Max: Freelance Police	Darla "The Geek" Gugenheek	Main role; 13 episodes
1998-1999	Bad Dog	Little Vic Potanski	Main role; 26 episodes
1998-1999	Flying Rhino Junior High	Marcus Snarkis	
1998–1999	Mythic Warriors: Guardians of the Legend	Iolas' Sister/Weaver Woman #2/Nymph #2/Siren #1/Nymph No. 3	(5 episodes)
1998–2001	Rolie Polie Olie	Clock Mouse/Lady Bug	recurring role; seasons 1-5; (1 episode); "Zowie Soupy Hero"
1999	Redwall	Warbeak	main role; 13 episodes
1999	Tweenies	Milo (US version)	
1999	Something from Nothing	Mazel/Avremel/Sister Mouse #2/Boy No. 3	TV short; credited as Tracy Moore
2000	The Accuser	Elizabeth "Liz" Heath	
2000	Redwall: The Movie	Warbeak	TV movie
2000	Mattimeo: A Tale of Redwall	Warbeak	main role; 13 episodes
2000–2001	Anne of Green Gables: The Animated Series	Dryad/Helen/Wildflower	recurring roles; 7 episodes
2000–2002	Pelswick	Kate Eggert	main role; 26 episodes
2000–2003	George Shrinks	George Bernard Shrinks	main role; 40 episodes
2001–2004	RoboRoach	Additional voices	main role; 52 episodes
2002	Martin the Warrior: A Tale of Redwall	Queen Amballa	(3 episodes); "Rose of Noonvale", "Battlefield Marshank", "New Friends & Old Enemies"
2002–2006	Henry's World	Fraidy Begonia	main role; 25 episodes
2005	Coconut Fred's Fruit Salad Island!	Bingo Cherry	recurring role; 2 episodes
2007–2008	Care Bears: Adventures in Care-a-lot	Share Bear	Main role; 24 episodes
2009	Zigby	Zigby	Main role
2009–2013	Strawberry Shortcake's Berry Bitty Adventures	Strawberry Shortcake	singing voice

=== Casting and Voice Director ===
- Moore also worked as a voice director for Sailor Moon, Bad Dog, Mythic Warriors: Guardians of the Legend, Highlander: The Animated Series, Corduroy, and Atomic Betty as well as a casting director on Bad Dog and Tales from the Cryptkeeper.

Preceded by None	Voice of Sailor Moon; Eps. 1 – 11, 15, 21	Succeeded by Terri Hawkes
