= Tatamagouche Mountain, Nova Scotia =

Community in Nova Scotia, Canada

Coordinates: 45°37′54″N 63°16′08″W

Tatamagouche Mountain in Nova Scotia

Tatamagouche Mountain is a community in the Canadian province of Nova Scotia, located in Colchester County.
