= The Secret World of Benjamin Bear =

Canadian Animated children's television series

- Created by: Jill Brett; Cherylyn Brooks; Chris Schouten; Gerald Tripp; Johnathan Wiseman
- Directed by: Cory Morrison; Chris Schouten
- Voices of: Jonathan Crombie; Stuart Stone; Tracey Moore; Kenia Pena (S1-2); Tia Caroleo (S4); John Stocker; Thelma Farmer; James Watts; Michael O'Reilly; Kate Hurman; Terrence Scammell; Amanda Tripp; Emma Taylor Isherwood
- Composer: Edmund Eagan
- Country of origin: Canada
- Original language: English
- No. of seasons: 4
- No. of episodes: 52 (104 segments)

Production
- Executive producers: Ken Anderson (season 1 only); Sheldon S. Wiseman
- Producers: Ken Anderson; Cherylyn Brooks; Mark Edwards (season 1); Chantal Ling
- Running time: 22 minutes (11 minutes per segment)
- Production companies: Amberwood Entertainment; Secret Bear Productions; PASI; Pipeline Studios (Season 4 only); Super Sonics Post Production

Original release
- Network: Family Channel
- Release: September 15, 2003 – May 23, 2009

The Secret World of Benjamin Bear is a Canadian animated television series and a joint effort produced by Amberwood Entertainment, Secret Bear Productions, and produced with the participation of Bell Broadcast and New Media Fund, including an animation by Philippine animation studio PASI. It originally aired on Family Channel from 2003–2009. 52 episodes were produced over four seasons, with 13 episodes per season, two segments per episode.

The Secret World of Benjamin Bear is a continuation series following The Teddy Bears' Picnic (1989), The Teddy Bears' Christmas (1992), The Teddy Bears' Rescue (1997), and The Teddy Bears' Scare (1998) which were set in the mid-20th century with the young Simon and Sally Tanner, and follows the new adventures of Benjamin Bear, set years later in the 2000s where he is now owned by Max Tanner, the son of the now older Simon Tanner. Benjamin is accompanied by his teddy housemate and best friend Howie Bear who, following the same theme of the original Teddy Bears' series with Wally, is young and inexperienced, and must learn from Ben.

== Characters ==
=== Teddy Bears ===
- Benjamin "Ben" Bear (voiced by Jonathan Crombie) is the main protagonist of the series. He is orange-colored and wears a red vest. His owner is Max Tanner, and his best friend is Howie.
- Wally (voiced by Stuart Stone in The Teddy Bears' Picnic and The Teddy Bears' Christmas, and Amanda Tripp in The Teddy Bears' Scare) is a teddy bear who is an old friend of Ben's since The Teddy Bears' Christmas. He is owned by Simon's sister Sally. He is a light grey color and wears a blue with white stripes sailor collar drop cardigan. He was first seen in The Teddy Bears' Picnic.
- Doc (voiced by Tracey Moore) is a teddy bear that belonged to Amanda and only appeared in The Teddy Bears' Picnic. He is light brown with a yellow-orange shirt, has button eyes and a round little nose.
- Howie Bear (voiced by Kenia Pena (Seasons 1-2); Tia Caroleo (Season 4)) is Ben's best friend. He is yellow colored and wears white t-shirt and green overalls. His owner is Eliza Tanner. He resembles Corduroy.
- Edgar of Old (voiced by John Stocker) is a 200-year-old pale yellow bear and the first teddy bear ever made. He wears a navy blue vest and white collar. He is the leader of the teddy community. His owner is Miss Abby Periwinkle.
- Ruby Red (voiced by Amanda Tripp) is a friend of Ben's whom he has a crush on. She is dusty rose colored and wears a red ribbon around her neck. She is owned by a toy store owner named Maclarean.
- Holly Bear (voiced by Emma Taylor-Isherwood) is a panda teddy bear and a very close friend of Howie. Her owner is Lindsay.
- Sebastian Biggleboar (voiced by Terrence Scammell) is a pompous bear who considers himself better than everyone else and speaks with a British accent. He is brown colored and wears a blue bowtie. His owner is Bobbie.
- Raymond (voiced by Rick Jones) is a purple teddy bear with pink torso who was a carnival prize before being dumped on the street. After wandering around the woods nearby, he was found by Ben and Howie, and taken to MacLaren's toy store. Raymond considers Hector, the overweight employee of MacLaren's his "kid", even though he is an adult.
- Toot Sweet (voiced by Terrence Scammell) is a polar teddy bear with red and green scarf and hat, who runs Toots'. He sounds like Eugene the Elephant from Animal Crackers.
- The Clean-Up Crew are three small teddy bears who belong to three energetic children. They are brown colored and usually seen in black suits and sunglasses. It is their job to deal with big problems that arise in the teddy world.
- Winifred is a teddy who works in the teddy council. She is pink colored and wears glasses and pale blue ribbon around her neck.
- Trixie Belle is a Teddy Tech graduate whom Sebastian has a crush on. She is brown colored and wears an orange ribbon around her neck.
- Mrs. Crackers (voiced by Kate Hurman) is a female teddy bear who runs the library. She is beige colored and wears glasses, green shirt and bow on her head.
- Felix was Laura's old teddy and now he lives in Italy with his new owner, who is a girl named Antonia. He is golden yellow with purple stitch on his tummy.
- General (voiced by Michael O'Reilly) is a military teddy bear with an English accent. He is brown colored and wears military helmet and medals on his chest.
- Mr. Lister is a teddy bear in charge of the Teddy Relocation Center. He is grayish-brown colored and wears glasses and orange collar shirt with brown tie.
- Buzz is a teddy that appeared in the episode "Close the Door Ben". He is light brown colored and wears a green vest.
- Enrico is Ruby Red's friend who lives in Italy.
- Lily is a young teddy bear. She is part of the general's marching band. She is beige colored and wears yellow dress and bow on her head.
- Dr. Tiffany Tuff (voiced by Kate Hurman) is a teddy bear who is a physician. She runs the Teddy Hospital. She is brown colored and wears a lab coat and a pink bow on her head.
- Freddy (voiced by Terrence Scammell) is a teddy bear that was handmade from gray woolen socks.
- Gonzo (voiced by Michael O'Reilly) is a blue teddy bear who is very energetic.
- Bernie is a teddy bear with a blue cap.
- Mrs. Poppy
- Samantha
- Louie
- Albert
- Tatayoshi (voiced by Amanda Tripp) is a Japanese teddy bear with brown hair and a blue dress.
- Angus
- Frankie
- Woowly
- Bertie
- Happy
- Ravi
- Beeline
- Finningen
- Cory

=== People ===
- Max Tanner (voiced by Kenia Pena (Seasons 1-2); Tia Caroleo (Season 4)) is Simon's son, Eliza's brother and Benjamin's owner. Max was given Benjamin by his father, who was Benjamin's previous kid. In The Secret World of Benjamin Bear, his design resembles Steve from Curious George.
- Eliza Tanner (voiced by Emma Taylor-Isherwood) is Howie's owner. She is Max's younger sister and Simon's daughter.
- Simon Tanner (voiced by Ryan Lindsey – The Teddy Bears' Christmas, Michael Caloz – The Teddy Bears' Scare (young Simon) / Terrence Scammell (adult Simon)) is Max's father and Benjamin's previous owner.
- Sally Tanner (voiced by Elissa Marcus in The Teddy Bears' Picnic, Kylie Schibli in The Teddy Bears' Christmas, and Gabrielle Lazarovitz in The Teddy Bears' Scare) is Simon's younger sister.
- Simon and Sally's Parents (voiced by Liz Macrae (Mom) / Terrence Scammell (Dad) in The Teddy Bears' Scare): Although only mentioned and voice cameo in Teddy Bears' Christmas, and a brief speaking cameo from Dad in Teddy Bears' Picnic, they made an appearance in The Teddy Bears' Scare. They are Max and Eliza's grandparents.
- Laura Tanner (voiced by Thelma Farmer) is a kind and caring workaholic mother of Max and Eliza and the wife of Simon Tanner who was the owner of Felix.
- Betty (voiced by Samantha Rushforth): Only appearing in The Teddy Bears' Christmas, she was Simon and Sally's kind babysitter who had a part time job as being an elf in Santa's Workshop in Maclarean's Toy Store.
- Boy on Sled (voiced by Jonathan Cameron) only appeared in The Teddy Bears' Christmas.
- Bobbie is Sebastian's owner. She has a Doberman Pinscher named Chomper, who loves Sebastian.
- Amanda (voiced by Marsha Moreau) is a little girl that only appeared in The Teddy Bears' Picnic.
- Miss Abby Periwinkle is Edgar's owner. She is the only human who knows that teddy bears are all secretly alive. Miss Periwinkle had learn the secret life of teddy bears, after Edgar revealed all the secrets to her, when she was just a little girl.
- Mr. Maclarean (voiced by Terrence Scammell) is Ruby's owner. He is a Scottish man who owns a large toy store called "Maclarean's", and behaves like a child himself.
- Lindsay is Holly's owner and she is friends with Eliza.
- Store Clerk (voiced by Thelma Farmer) is a minor character who only appeared in The Teddy Bears' Christmas.
- Mr. Biggleboar (voiced by John Stocker) is Bobbie's single father, who after witnessing Sebastian being alive in "Lights, Camera, Caught", has been occasionally trying to prove the sentience of teddy bears ever since.
- Mr. Jones (voiced by Johni Keyworth) is an old but friendly Night Watchman who works in Maclarean's Toy Store. He only appeared in The Teddy Bears' Christmas.
- Mrs. Jones (voiced by Margot Kidder) is a friendly old lady who lives across the street to the Tanners. Simon, Sally, Ben and Wally thought she was a witch. She only appears in The Teddy Bears' Scare.
- Santa (voiced by Jim McNabb): Only appearing in The Teddy Bears' Christmas, Santa happily played his part in the Santa's Workshop in Maclarean's Toy Store.
- Hector (voiced by Michael O'Reilly) is an overweight employee of Maclarean's, who does maintenance work around the store. He enjoys eating donuts and is Raymond's "kid".
- Stanley (voiced by Tia Caroleo) is an energetic kid who has orange hair and wears a yellow sweater. He is Gonzo's owner.

=== Animals ===
- Slurp (specials) was the Tanner family's bulldog, Simon and Sally's pet dog when they were young children that appeared only in The Teddy Bears' Christmas and The Teddy Bears' Scare. Slurp posed as an antagonist to Ben and Wally.
  - Slurp (TV series) is the Tanner's family Bulldog that appears in the series. Unlike his senior, this Slurp is very playful and friendly, with humans and teddy bears alike.
- Chomper is Bobbie's dog. He only likes Sebastian and dislikes Ben and Howie. Sebastian enjoys seeing Chomper chase Ben and Howie around.
- Marigold is Lindsay's dog. She is very energetic and loves to disturb the teddies.
- Froth Moth is a fictional species of clothes moth that feeds on teddy bear stuffing. As a result, Froth Moths are the most feared creature in the teddy world.
- Champ is Mike's pet dog and loves to play teddy fetch with Trixie Belle.
- Patches is Eliza's cat. She likes to cause trouble with just about everything she can, especially Ben and Howie.
- Screech is Mrs. Jones' black cat who only appears in The Teddy Bears' Scare.

== Locations ==
- Maclarean's Toy Store is a toy store owned by Mr. Maclearrean. There is a teddy library, a place where the teddy council meets, and other secret teddy hiding places.
- Toot Sweet's Garden Cafe is a café, where the owner, Toot, is known for making honey shakes.
- Abby Periwinkle's House is the home of Miss Periwinkle. She lives there with her bear Edgar. There are different teddy hiding places in the house. Miss Periwinkle's garden is used for special occasions like Greeting Ceremonies.
- Tanner House is a house where the Tanner family lives. There are different teddy tunnels so Ben and Howie can get from "room to room" and "place to place" easily.
- Bobbie's House is a house where Bobbie's family lives. It is the neighboring home to the Tanner House. Chomper acts as a watch dog to the house at night.
- Teddy Hospital is in a real hospital. This is where the teddies go if they have teddy health problems, such as new stuffing or stitching.
- The Library

== Specials list ==
- The Teddy Bears' Picnic (1989)
- The Teddy Bears' Christmas (1992)
- The Teddy Bears' Rescue (1997)
- The Teddy Bears' Scare (1998)

== Episode list ==
=== Season 1 (2003) ===
1. Fuzz and Buzz; Game Over (15 September 2003)
2. Just for Laughs; Auctioning Edgar (22 September 2003)
3. Green-Eyed Monster; Last Minute Leader (29 September 2003)
4. Lights, Camera, Caught!; Over the Volcano (6 October 2003)
5. Happy Campers; Teddy Picnic (13 October 2003)
6. Maxwell's Dilemma; Abominable Bear (20 October 2003)
7. Ooey Gooey; Wrong Howie (27 October 2003)
8. Best Friends; Harry Hamster (3 November 2003)
9. Driving Miss Hilda Crazy; One Stormy Night (10 November 2003)
10. Cracking Up; Trouble for Toots (17 November 2003)
11. A Star is Born; Who Took the Teddifesto? (24 November 2003)
12. Quest for the Holly Bear; Bears Away (1 December 2003)
13. Cargo Cat; Perfect Match (8 December 2003)

=== Season 2 (2005) ===
1. The Big Scare; Raymond's Frisky Friend (1 March 2005)
2. Teddy Tech; Badminton Bet (8 March 2005)
3. Outbreak; Triple Trouble (15 March 2005)
4. General Alarm; Bouncing Bertie (22 March 2005)
5. Clean Up Kid; Lucky Raymond (29 March 2005)
6. Finding Felix; Froth Fright (5 April 2005)
7. Canine Chaos; There and Back (12 April 2005)
8. Edgar's Tale; Deep Secret (19 April 2005)
9. The General's Kid; Just Like Ben (26 April 2005)
10. Teddy Splat Spat; Close the Door, Ben! (3 May 2005)
11. Teddy Trails; Yo Ho Ho (10 May 2005)
12. Ben Between; Teddy Training (17 May 2005)
13. Happy Birthday Mrs. P; Top Teddy (24 May 2005)

=== Season 3 (2006) ===
1. Fixing Freddy; Bad Hair Daze (13 September 2006)
2. Lister Says; Sweet n' Sour (20 September 2006)
3. Fitting In; Itch to Switch (27 September 2006)
4. Edgar's Letter; Room at the Top (4 October 2006)
5. Teddy Tango; Sebastian Calling (11 October 2006)
6. Teddy Kite Flight; Hand-Me-Down Bear (18 October 2006)
7. Saving Sebastian; Tuff Love (25 October 2006)
8. Following Finnegan; Raymond's Place (1 November 2006)
9. Zowie Howie; Grow Seed Grow (8 November 2006)
10. Tunnel Trouble; Teddy Overdrill (15 November 2006)
11. Lister's Mistake; Teddy Return (22 November 2006)
12. Rocket Teddy; Teddy Tracker (29 November 2006)
13. The Raymond Reaction; Big Bear (6 December 2006)

=== Season 4 (2009) ===
1. Teddy Time; Lonesome at the Top (28 February 2009)
2. House Bound Bear; Howie Power (7 March 2009)
3. Teddy Flip Flop; Proudly Purple (14 March 2009)
4. Ben's Decision; The General's Bath (21 March 2009)
5. Teddy Slow Down; Going Home (28 March 2009)
6. Ben's Nose Knows; A Tickle Too Far (4 April 2009)
7. Helping Happy; Fishy Friendship (11 April 2009)
8. Blip Blork; Finders Keepers (18 April 2009)
9. A Teddy's Dream; Ben's Day Off (25 April 2009)
10. Teddy Trick; Sebastian's Chance (2 May 2009)
11. Freddie's First Snow; The Perfect Gift (9 May 2009)
12. Sebastian the King; The Trouble with Toots (16 May 2009)
13. Too Much Champ; Happy's Big Day (23 May 2009)

== See also ==
- Teddy bear
