= Batman action figures =

Model figurine of a DC Comics character

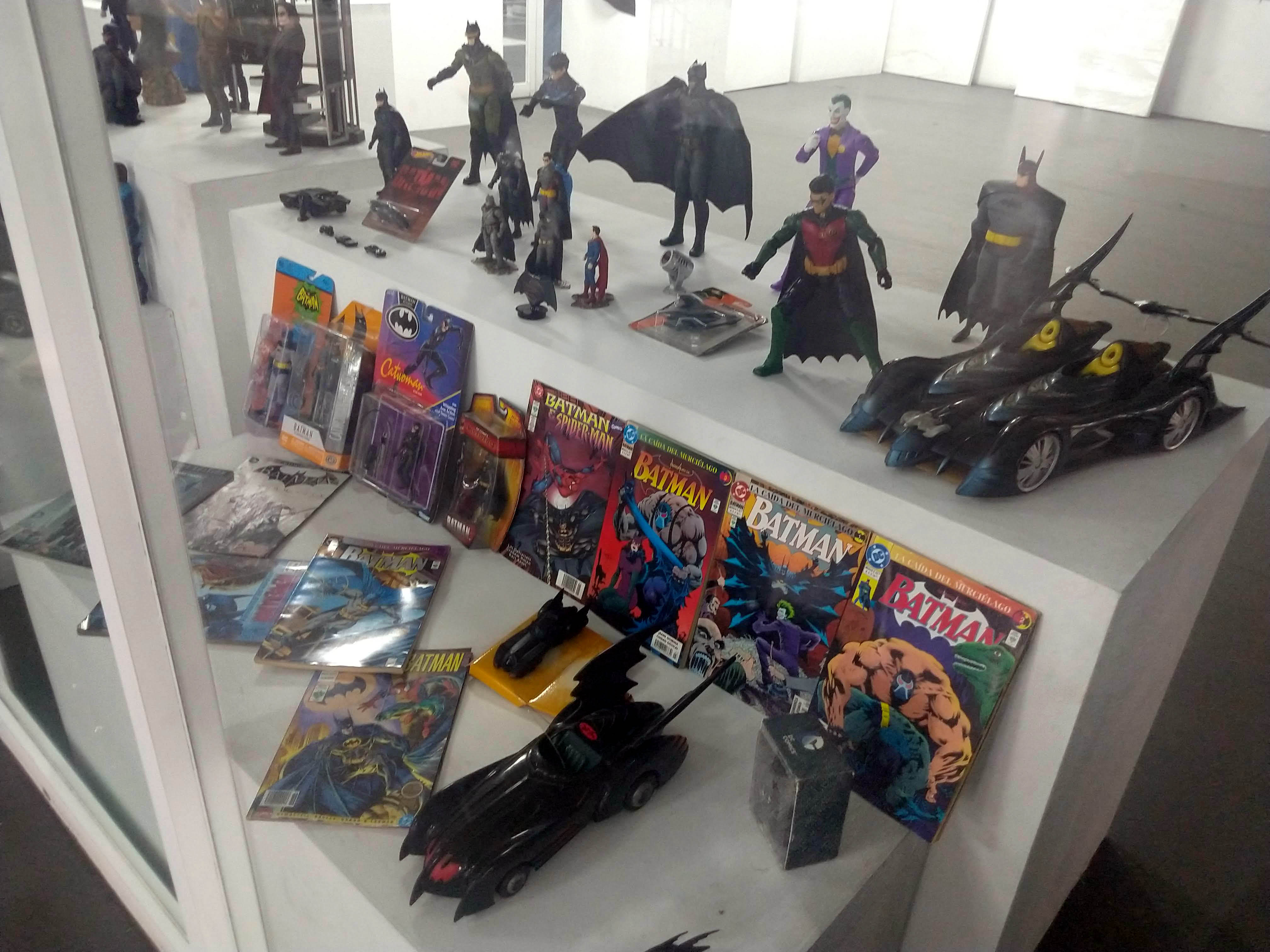
- Some Batman action figures, vehicles, and comics, exhibited in 2022
- Type: Action figures
- Invented by: DC Comics
- Company: Marx (1960s); Ideal (1966–72); Mego (1972–84); Kenner (1984–89, 1990–00); Toy Biz (1989–90); Hasbro (2000–03); Mattel (2003–19); McFarlane (2019–present)
- Country: United States
- Availability: Late 1940s–present
- Materials: Plastic, Lead
- Features: Batman

Batman action figures have been produced since the 1940s. These action figures, inspired by the character's appearance in comics and serials, were created by DC Comics and manufactured by various toy companies. These figures were made of various materials such as wood, tin, and plastic. They were typically between 6 and 8 inches in height and featured movable joints that allowed them to be posed in various positions.

== Early year ==
The first Batman action figures were lead figurines of Batman and Robin. These were then given away as carnival prizes at local fairs during the 1940s.

== Marx ==
The Marx Toy Company produced the first pose-able Batman action figure in the mid-1960s. It was about 4" tall (10 cm) and came with a multitude of accessories including cuffs, batarangs, and a fire extinguisher. Very few remain in existence, and they have been described as the "holy grail" for vintage Batman toy collectors.

== Ideal's Captain Action ==
In 1966, the Ideal Toy Company launched a line of superhero action figures called Captain Action in response to Hasbro's popular G.I. Joe line, which followed the standard action figure scale of 12". The Captain Action figure came dressed with a cloth superhero costume, hat, ray gun, and a sword, ready for kids to enjoy. Parents could also buy additional superhero costumes that were sold separately, and kids could take Captain Action's costume off and replace it with one of several superhero costumes based on famous comic book characters.

Also in 1966, the ABC Television Network launched a live-action Batman TV series. Because of Batman's growing success in the mid-'60s, a Batman costume was included in Captain Action's arsenal. This Batman costume was detailed with a horizontally striped cape as well as a black and gold chest emblem (the costume set was available with both metal and decal chest emblems). Batman's accessories included a blue Batarang, a flashlight, and a drill, which could all be attached to the figure's utility belt.

In 1967, Ideal released a partner figure for Captain Action, his youthful sidekick, "Action Boy". Ideal Toy's released only three costumes for Action Boy to change into, one of them being Robin, Batman's sidekick.

== Mego's World's Greatest Superheroes! ==
In 1972, the Mego Corporation made a landmark deal and secured the licenses to create toys for both National Periodical Publications (later DC Comics) and Marvel Comics. Similar to Ideal Toy's Captain Action line, these figures featured removable cloth costumes, unlike the Captain Action line, the costumes came with the figure instead of being sold separately. The bodies were a smaller 8" size and the heads and clothing were interchangeable. During this time period, Mego released the first comprehensive line of DC and Marvel character action figures and coined the term "World's Greatest Super Heroes!" to umbrella the name for all the figures released in this line. The popularity of this line of 8" figures created the standard scale for the 1970s and featured many Batman characters, including Batman, Robin, Catwoman, the Penguin, the Riddler, and the Joker.

The earliest Batman and Robin figures had removable masks, but these were easily lost. Mego found that it was less expensive to create a new sculpt for Batman with a molded on a mask and paint the mask onto Robin. Mego was a true pioneer in action figure development, responsible for creating the first carded action figure (for S. S. Kresge's), The first exclusive figures (Bruce Wayne and Dick Grayson for Montgomery Ward's) and expanded their line to include the 1966 Batman TV series-style Batmobile, the Batcycle. and the Batcopter, as well as playsets for Batman characters such as the Batcave and the Wayne Foundation. Mego Batman figures were offered from 1972 until 1983.

== Mego/Kenner transition ==
Realizing the success of the 8" line of figures, and always thinking of ways to reduce costs of production, Mego Corp. released a smaller plastic line of action toys called "Comic Action Heroes!" in 1975 that had the costumes molded onto the figure, thus eliminating the extra cost of creating the suits. The Comic Action Heroes were the first all-plastic smaller scale action figures. The line featured Batman, Robin, The Joker, and The Penguin as well as other DC Comics characters. Later, in 1979, Mego re-released the line under the new name Pocket Super Heroes, a name that would return more than 20 years later as part of DC Direct's superhero line of figures (see below). After Mego made the fatal mistake of not securing the licensing for Star Wars products, Kenner Products scooped up the licensing and banked on success for the next 30 years. The figures they made were also smaller and all plastic, thus creating a new standard size and style for the action figure.

== Super Powers Collection ==
In 1984, after Mego's demise, the Kenner toy company was granted the rights to produce DC Comics character all-plastic dolls in 5" scale, and soon after, the Super Powers Collection. Each figure, as the name implies, had a secret superpower that would trigger when the figure's arms or legs were squeezed. Kenner produced 3 different Super Powers lines.

During its time on the market, the Super Powers Collection released action figures of Batman, Robin, The Joker, The Penguin, and Mr. Freeze, as well as several other DC Comics characters. Toy shelves also reserved space for a 1980s comic book styled Batmobile and a Batcopter that would later be reproduced in black & gold for The Dark Knight Collection of 1990 (see Kenner Film Figures). Production of all Super Powers Collection figures ended before rumored Batman character figures such as Catwoman and Man-Bat could be produced.

== Toy Biz DC Super Heroes & Pacipa's Super Amigos ==
Since Kenner had stopped production of DC Comics character figures in 1986 when the Super Powers line folded, DC Comics granted the license to the up-and-coming toy company, Toy Biz, in 1989. Toy Biz first produced figures for the Batman tie-in, then released other DC Comics character figures under the name DC Comics Super Heroes, a name that would later be used again by different toy companies (see below). The Flash TV series character received a tie-in figure from Toy Biz as well.

Also in 1989, the South American toy company Pacipa bought old Super Powers molds to create a line of DC Comics character figures called "Super Amigos". Exclusive to South America, all of the figures were reproductions of Super Powers figures, but made with low-quality plastic and poor paint jobs. This collection also gave way to a Riddler action figure in the form of a repainted Green Lantern base sculpt. A rare piece, this figure is highly sought after by collectors.

Back in the US, the Toy Biz line brought some new figures to the shelves not previously featured in the Super Powers line including Two-Face and the Riddler. Like Pacipa's Super Amigos, the figures featured low-quality plastic, and the majority was slightly retooled reproductions of the Super Powers line from Kenner. Although the Batman brand of figures seemed to be initially popular in sales, the others were not as successful. DC Comics noticed the poor quality of the figures and cancelled the license, returning it to Kenner.

== Kidz Biz / Bikin Foreign Releases ==
A foreign release based on the Batman 1989 film was an 8" Batman figure in Australia by Kidz Biz and in Belgium by Bikin. These figures featured real clothing with removable plastic accessories, similar in style to the Mego figures that debuted nearly two decades earlier.

== Film figures ==
=== Batman ===
The same year that Toy Biz won and lost the rights to produce DC Comics figures, Kenner regained the rights and produced a line of Batman figures. Released in 1990, these were the first DC Comics figures produced by Kenner in four years.

Kenner's Dark Knight Collection consisted of several versions of Batman, set apart only by different paint jobs and unique accessories. A Quick-Change Bruce Wayne figure and two versions of the Joker made up the rest of the figures. The Dark Knight Collection also boasted several vehicles including a Batmobile and Turbo Batwing as well as role playing toys. Some items were inexplicitly reused from past Kenner lines such as RoboCop and the Ultra Police, SilverHawks, and Police Academy. Others, such as the Batcave Command Center and Jokermobile, were shown in the Kenner Action Toy Guide but postponed for future Batman lines.

=== Batman Returns ===
When the feature film Batman Returns hit theaters in 1992, Kenner renamed their toyline Batman Returns. This new line included several versions of the same Batman figure sculpt as seen in the previous Dark Knight Collection line. The film's villains, Catwoman and Penguin, received their own figures. Catwoman received a new sculpt, but the Penguin figure was a repainted sculpt from Kenner's Super Power's line.

At the same time Batman Returns hit theaters, Tim Drake became the newest Robin in Batman comics. Because of Robin's rejuvenated popularity, a new Robin figure which featured a sculpt based on the newest comic book design was introduced in the Batman Returns line, though Drake did not appear in the film.

=== Batman Forever ===
In 1995, Batman Forever was released featuring Val Kilmer as the Dark Knight. Breaking away from the repetitive base sculpt of the previous two collections, Kenner produced Batman Forever figures using a wider range of fresh sculpts.

Target later released their own series of exclusive Batman Forever action figures as well. These were simply repainted figures from the original line, and they came on a newly styled card.

=== Batman & Robin ===
For the 1997 release of Batman & Robin, the final Batman film of the '90s, Kenner released the Batman & Robin figure line. Unlike previous lines, the Batman & Robin line featured several versions of the film's villains, not just heroes. Kenner also released several hero/villain 2-packs and 12" figures.

== Batman Gets Animated ==
=== Batman: The Animated Series ===
Shortly after the 1992 premiere of Batman: The Animated Series, Kenner produced a line of figures based on the series. Like the previous two Batman movie lines, the first few lines of figures included several versions of Batman, and also included multiple versions of Robin and new villains including Clayface, Scarecrow, Poison Ivy, and others.

In 1993, another Batman film was released, an animated feature film called Batman: Mask of the Phantasm. Kenner produced Mask of the Phantasm figures using old Batman: T.A.S. molds and only a few new sculpts such as Jet Pack Joker and Phantasm.

As time went by, Kenner's Batman: T.A.S. line began losing steam, so Kenner retooled some of their figures, releasing Batman: T.A.S.: Crime Squad. This line had several Batman variations, but only included one Robin figure and no villain figures.

Later, Kenner renamed this line The Adventures of Batman & Robin. It included several figures that were not released as part of the Batman: T.A.S. line, including Harley Quinn.

Like Batman: T.A.S., The Adventures of Batman & Robin line started to lose steam as well, so Kenner released The Adventures of Batman & Robin: D.U.O. Force. Despite its introduction of a Batgirl figure, the collection primarily featured repaints of old molds with new accessories and quickly folded.

=== The New Batman Adventures ===
As Hasbro bought out Kenner, a new line of action figures were produced by Hasbro based on the new animated series, The New Batman Adventures. This line featured new sculpts based on the updated animated series from the WB network. The first Creeper and Mad Hatter figures were included in this line.

After the first line of figures was released, The New Batman Adventures line took on the subtitle Mission Masters. This line featured the new Riddler and Mr. Freeze sculpts. The second Mission Masters line featured repaints of old Batman: T.A.S. figures, including The Joker.

To move away from The New Batman Adventures line, Kenner/Hasbro released the third and fourth Mission Masters lines under the basic Batman title. Included were figures from Batman: The Animated Series, The New Batman Adventures, Kenner's Superman Adventures line, and some Batman Beyond (see below) figures. Also included was a new comic style Bruce Wayne/Batman figure, rumble ready Riddler and an animated style insect body Mr.Freeze.

Later, Hasbro released several Batman: T.A.S., The Adventures of Batman and Robin, and The New Batman Adventures repaints in the Spectrum of the Bat action figure line.

=== Batman Beyond ===
Hasbro released a new line of figures based on Batman Beyond. This line, like all Batman lines in the past, featured many versions of Batman, but only a few versions of the series's villains and no supporting characters.

Later, Hasbro released Batman Beyond: Bat-Links. Unlike Hasbro's earlier Batman Beyond toy line, this line was not based on the series, but had an Elseworlds computer theme.

A Batman Beyond: Return of the Joker tie-in line of figures were produced which included several The New Batman Adventures figures as well as Batman Beyond Figures.

== Comic figures ==
=== Legends of Batman ===
In 1994, Kenner released a whole new line of Batman action figures which included all new sculpts instead of reused molds of old figures. The Legends of Batman line of figures included several Elseworlds versions of Batman, but also included true to comic versions of several Batman characters including Knightquest Batman, KnightsEnd Batman, Nightwing, The Joker, Catwoman and The Riddler. This line never gained popularity, though, and was cancelled soon after its debut. Several years later, WB Stores were offered exclusive repainted sculpts of the Legends of Batman line of figures.

=== Legends of the Dark Knight ===
After the failed Legends of Batman line, Kenner gave the Elseworlds version of Batman figures one last shot by releasing Legends of the Dark Knight. Based on the popular comic of the same name, Legends of the Dark Knight featured all Elseworlds versions of Batman and other characters. The only character figures in this line to stay true to their comic images were Dark Knight Detective Batman, an online exclusive, and Man-Bat. Like Legends of Batman, this line never gained popularity and was quickly cancelled. Later, a few unproduced figures from this line were offered as online exclusives.

=== Superman: Man of Steel ===
Also in 1994, Kenner moved away from their focus on DC's Batman and released a Superman comic character line called Superman: The Man of Steel. This line featured several popular characters from the Superman comics, but also included several two-packs which featured Batman and Superman together. Two of the Superman/Batman figures later turned up as mail-away exclusives in the Batman: Total Justice line of figures. (see below)

=== Batman: Total Justice ===
In 1996, Kenner started production on a new line of DC Comics character figures. This line, like Legends of Batman and Legends of the Dark Knight, featured all new sculpts of popular DC Comics characters. To appeal to buyers, Kenner produced the line under the high selling Batman title, calling the line Batman: Total Justice. This line featured not only Batman, Robin, and The Huntress, but also included other DC Comics characters including Superman, Green Lantern, The Flash and others.

Even though this was the first line of DC Comics character figures released by Kenner since the Super Powers line folded 10 years earlier, some fans were disappointed. Despite remarkably detailed sculpts, the figures' static poses and "Fractal Armor" accessories caused unhappiness. Wanting more articulation and less gimmick, some abandoned the Total Justice line, and Kenner stopped production after the release of 14 figures.

=== JLA ===
Two years after the Total Justice line faded, the Hasbro toy company produced the same figures included in the Total Justice line, this time releasing them under the name JLA (a tie-in with the popular comic title). Several of the unproduced Total Justice figures were produced in this line, but no new Batman related characters were included. A redesigned Joker figure was included in a JLA box set.

=== Hasbro's DC Super Heroes ===
Returning to the comic roots of Mego's Comic Action/Pocket Hero's lines, Hasbro released a new line of 7" plastic dolls called DC Super Heroes. Unlike the earlier Toy Biz line by the same name, this line featured new sculpts with great detail. Only one line of figures were released, though, and they were very hard to find. The reason for the short life of a great line that had many possibilities remains unclear.

Between 1999 and 2002, Hasbro produced several 9" Mego-like figures in the DC Super Hero line, as well as Target Exclusives. This occurred as Mattel was taking over the line, which halted the line before it was completed. Batman figures included were the MasterPiece Batman box set with a Year One 1939 Batman Figure, Golden Age Collection featuring Batman and Robin, Silver Edition Removable Cowl Batman and Guardian of Gotham featuring a molded cowl head and a Bruce Wayne quick change. Villains offered were the Joker and Penguin.

=== Batman: Knight Force Ninjas ===
In 1998, Kenner produced a new line of Batman figures called Batman: Knight Force Ninjas. This line, like Legends of Batman and Legends of the Dark Knight, featured all new sculpts of Batman in an Elseworld theme. Notable figures were the first Azrael figure, and a new Killer Croc figure.

=== DC Direct ===
Fans and collectors wanted better figures, not just repaints, DC Comics started production on their own line of action figures. These highly articulated figures, based on popular DC Comics characters, feature many Batman characters, and also feature storyline inspired character figures including Elseworld figures.

DC Direct also released a new line of Pocket Super Heroes, mini action figures that kids could put in their pocket. The Pocket Super Heroes come in boxed sets, including a Batman boxed set featuring Batman, Bruce Wayne, Robin, Alfred Pennyworth, Catwoman, and Two-Face.

=== Batman around the world ===
To please fans around the globe, DC Comics gave a license to Japanese toy company Yamato to produce a line of Batman action figures. These figures were only released in Japan in 2003, but DC Direct released the same figures in America in 2004. Later, another Japanese toy company, Takara, created a new line of Batman action figures under their long lived Microman Toyline, which was sold in the U.S. market in the 1970s under the name Micronauts. Featuring more articulation than the Yamato line, these figures also saw their American debut in 2004.

== Kenner Ends, Mattel Begins ==
In 2003, Mattel won the rights to produce Batman and other DC Comics character figures from Hasbro. Before losing control, Hasbro released its final sets of Batman animated figures. Most figures were featured in two packs, and were store exclusives. K-Mart, Wal-Mart and Toys 'R' Us released these figures before Mattel took over production.

After Hasbro's line faded, Mattel quickly produced its own line of retooled Batman animated figures to tide fans over until it could release new figure lines. Some figures were new sculpts, while some were repaints of old Kenner/Hasbro sculpts.

=== Teen Titans ===
Around the same time as Mattel took over production of Batman and DC Comics character figures, Bandai released its own line of figures based on the Cartoon Network animated series Teen Titans. Teen Titans Go! features several Robin figures of different sizes.

=== The Batman ===
After the quickly released animated line faded, Mattel released a new Batman animated line based on The Batman. The Batman line of figures featured all new sculpts and more articulation than past animated lines.

After several waves of figures hit toy shelves, Mattel renamed the line The Batman: EXP. The EXP (EXtreme Power) hero figures come with a weapon that, when a power battery is connected and turned, reveals an "extreme power" feature.

When The Batman: EXP line faded, a new line of animated figures were announced. ShadowTek, a line featuring Robin and Killer Moth, hit shelves in late 2006. This line also includes re-released figures from earlier lines as well, a growing Mattel staple.

Later ShadowTek figures include other DC Universe heroes which appear in The Batman, including Superman, Hawkman, Green Lantern, The Flash, and Martian Manhunter.

In 2007, Mattel announced a large recall of toys, including toys from The Batman toy line, which featured lead paint and/or small magnets which could choke children.

=== Batman Begins ===
Mattel released a collection of figures based on Batman Begins. The line featured all new sculpts, but it had its share of problems. Most of the costumes and characters featured in the line did not match their film counterpart. Central characters such as Ninja Bruce Wayne, Henri Ducard, and Ra's al Ghul all featured identical body sculpts simply with different heads. Many figures had poor distribution, which caused fans to miss out on their favorite characters. In 2006, Mattel would release figures for Superman Returns which featured a similar scale and style as Batman Begins.

=== Four Horsemen's Batman ===
Realizing that fans wanted better quality figures based on their favorite comic characters, like the Toy Biz figure line Marvel Legends, Mattel released a new line of action figures designed by Four Horsemen studios based on the comic styled Batman universe of characters. The new Batman figures were taller than previously released Batman figures, and featured more articulation. While popular among collectors, a higher price tag in stores caused poor sales, which caused the line to quickly fade before the release of new figures (including Bane and Scarecrow) made it to American toy shelves. These figures but were released overseas, though, and American collectors could buy the figures online.

=== DC Superheroes ===
After the Four Horsemen styled Batman line folded, Mattel announced it would release more Four Horsemen styled Batman figures, as well as new Superman figures, with the new DC Comics Super Heroes line of figures. Unlike Toy Biz's earlier line of poor quality figures by the same name, the new figures were just what DC Comic fans were waiting for. The first line of figures included Batman, Killer Croc, and the unreleased Bane and Scarecrow figures from the Four Horsemen's previous Batman line. Used and unused molds from Mattel's Batman line would be used in later DC Super Heroes waves of figures, including the previously released Robin and a new Azrael and Catwoman sculpt.

=== DC Universe ===
When the DC Super Heroes line declined in popularity, Mattel quickly gained the rights to produce more DC Comics characters outside the Superman/Batman universe. The retitled line, DC Universe, hit toy shelves in 2008, featuring characters such as Red Tornado, Firestorm, Green Lantern, and Aquaman. Batman characters such as the Penguin, Harley Quinn, and Electric Superman Blue and Red were also announced for the line.

=== Justice League ===
Returning to the animated line, Cartoon Network's popular animated series, Justice League, also got its own line of figures produced by Mattel. The Justice League line features several Batman figures. The line was later renamed Justice League Unlimited.

In 2006, Mattel released several of the Justice League Unlimited figures under the name DC Super Heroes: Justice League Unlimited. These animated DC Super Heroes were released at the same time as the comic styled DC Super Heroes line of figures.

=== Exclusives ===
In 2003, 2 Batman figures, scale to the JLU figures, were exclusively released alongside the video game Batman: Rise of Sin Tzu video game. The two figures were a Batman with his original colors, and an exclusive Batgirl figure.

=== The Dark Knight ===
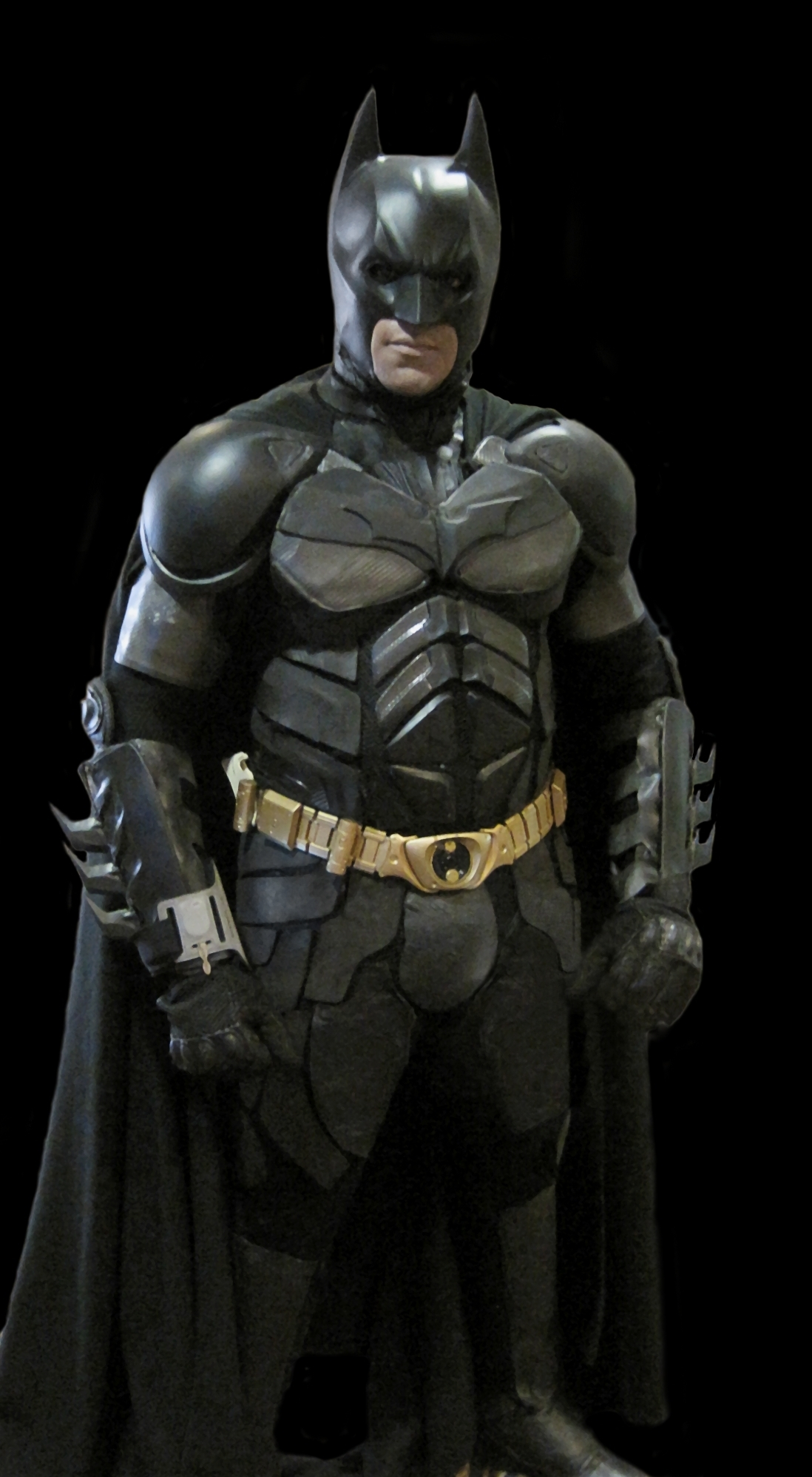
Cosplay of The Dark Knight film. The suit has been replicated in several action figures

In 2008, Mattel released a toy collection for The Dark Knight. Like the Batman Begins line, The Dark Knight line also featured 5-inch figures. The film's main villain, the Joker, bore little facial resemblance to Heath Ledger, displaying a simple, cartoon-like face. This likeness would be used throughout most of the film's marketing. A Two-Face figure was released in December 2008 along with Deathstroke and Firefly.

In a first for Batman action figures, a 6-inch line of figures was also produced called The Dark Knight Movie Masters. Designed by The Four Horsemen and displaying a much closer level of detail and more articulation than the 5-inch figures, Wave 1 of The Dark Knight Movie Masters were quickly bought up, making finding them in stores extremely difficult for several months. The line's Joker action figure became much desired among collectors due to Heath Ledger's death.

=== Matty Collector ===
Mattel began selling exclusive Batman: The Dark Knight and DC Universe figures exclusively on mattycollector.com in 2009, giving fans a chance to order items that are not found in stores.

=== Batman: The Brave and the Bold ===
Mattel also released a line of figures and playsets based on the series Batman: The Brave and the Bold.

=== Young Justice ===
Mattel released an action figure line based on Young Justice. The line included characters from the Batman universe, including Robin and Batman himself.

=== Arkham City and Arkham Asylum ===
An action figure line was released after the events and during the events of Arkham City and Arkham Asylum, which are still continuing now from 2009 to whenever the figures are ending. Places such as Toys "R" Us and the Big Bad Toy Store sell these action figures and many toy reviewers have used these action figures in their videos.

=== The Dark Knight Rises ===
An action figure line based on the film The Dark Knight Rises released 7 figures: Batman, Bane, Catwoman, John Blake, Alfred, Ra's al Ghul, and Jim Gordon.

=== Batman v Superman: Dawn of Justice & Justice League ===
Mattel released kid friendly figures from Batman v Superman: Dawn of Justice and Justice League. Each figure came with film-inspired weapons and featured less articulation and detail than the more expensive DC Multiverse figures.

=== DC Multiverse ===
Following the end of DC Universe Classics, 6-inch Batman figures began showing up in the successor DC Multiverse line. In addition to various comic iterations of the character, the line was home to figures of Ben Affleck's portrayal of Batman from the Batman v Superman: Dawn of Justice, Suicide Squad and Justice League films. For Batman's 80th anniversary in 2019, several special figures were released, celebrating the history of Batman.

=== True Moves ===
Mattel released many 12" DC Comics figures in the True Moves line, including figures from comics, television, and film. For Batman's 80th Anniversary in 2019, a 12" True Moves 1st Appearance Batman figure was released with a comic reprint of Batman's 1st appearance in Detective Comics #27.

=== Batman Missions ===
Batman Missions was a kid friendly action figure line featuring several popular Batman characters in comic inspired designs. A 12" True Moves line of Batman Missions figures was also released.

=== Dollar General / Family Dollar ===
Mattel released cheaper versions of their basic figures from the Batman Missions line in several "dollar stores" across America, including Dollar General and Family Dollar. The figures came in a small box, did not include any accessories, and had limited articulation.

== Mattel Ends, McFarlane & Spin Master Begins ==
In 2019, Mattel lost the license to produce DC Comics toys. The license was split between McFarlane Toys, which announced they would produce collector friendly action figures, and Spin Master, which announced they would produce the more kid friendly action figures.

=== McFarlane DC Universe ===
In January 2020, McFarlane released their first line of action figures based on DC Comics properties, including Batman and Superman. The figures stood taller than Mattel's DC Multiverse figures and features greater detail and more articulation, as well as more accessories.

=== Spin Master ===
In January 2020, Spin Master also released their 4" line of DC Comics and Batman action figures which came with mystery accessories.

== Funko Pop! ==
Funko released many of their Pop! Vinyl collector bobbleheads and figures based on various Batman properties, including television, film, and comic-inspired versions of the Dark Knight.
