= Police Academy (TV series) =

1988 American animated television series

- Also known as: Police Academy: The Animated Series
- Genre: Animated comedy police comedy
- Created by: Joe Ruby; Ken Spears
- Based on: Police Academy by Pat Proft & Neal Israel
- Directed by: Cosmo Anzilotti; Bill Hutton; Tony Love
- Voices of: Ron Rubin; Dan Hennessey; Howard Morris; Greg Morton; Len Carlson; Don Francks; Denise Pidgeon; Tedd Dillon
- Theme music composer: Scott Thomas Canfield
- Opening theme: "They Wear the Blue", performed by The Fat Boys
- Composer: John Debney
- Countries of origin: United States; Canada
- Original language: English
- No. of seasons: 2
- No. of episodes: 65 (list of episodes)

Production
- Executive producers: Joe Ruby; Ken Spears; Paul Maslansky
- Producer: Larry Huber
- Running time: 22 minutes
- Production companies: Ruby-Spears Enterprises; Warner Bros. Television

Original release
- Network: Syndication (United States)
- Release: September 10, 1988 – February 4, 1989

Police Academy (also known as Police Academy: The Animated Series) is a 1988 animated television series based on the Police Academy series of films. The show was produced by Ruby-Spears Enterprises for Warner Bros. Television. It aired weekdays and lasted two seasons for a total of 65 episodes.

Some episodes feature a crime boss named Kingpin. His keen intelligence, girth, and stature are very similar to the Marvel Comics character of the same name. Other new characters were added to the show as well. Among them were a group of talking police dogs called the Canine Corps. They were made up of Samson (the bulldog leader), Lobo (the noble yet clumsy husky), Bonehead (the dimwitted giant St. Bernard), Chili Pepper (the excitable chihuahua), and Schitzy (the only female, a Golden Retriever with an identity crisis). The theme song is performed by the Fat Boys, who also make an appearance in two episodes as House's Friends: Big Boss, Cool and Mark. Robert Folk's theme for the movies is used, uncredited, over the closing credits.

The animated series was popular in Europe, especially in Italy. It was also popular in the Arab world, where it was broadcast on Spacetoon and Al Aoula.

== Synopsis ==
The animated series takes place chronologically between the fourth and fifth films.

Thirteen characters are re-created for this animated version, including a team of Academy graduates led by Carey Mahoney, a rogue bachelor boy, who unconsciously—and consistently—makes life miserable for Captain Harris and his knucklehead assistant Sgt. Proctor.

Mahoney's friends include Moses Hightower (sound effects master Larvell Jones), trigger-happy Eugene Tackleberry, sweet and timid Laverne Hooks, hardened Debbie Callahan, colossal House, and the duo of reformed gang member Zed McGlunk and his best buddy, Carl Sweetchuck.

The show consists of the main chaeacters facing off against reoccuring villains such as Kingpin, Numbskull, The Claw, Mr. Sleaze, Lockjaw, and Amazona.

== Characters ==
- Cadet Carey Mahoney – The most clever among the officers. Mahoney is always ready to lend a hand to his companions. He is also the patrol partner of Larvell Jones.
- Cadet Larvell Jones – Mahoney's usual sidekick. He is a master of the martial arts and his main talent, beatboxing. He is also able to imitate all manner of noises, including sirens, gunfire, helicopters, and so forth.
- Cadet Carl Sweetchuck – The shortest member with a cowardlike personality. He is very accident prone and oblivious to the harm caused by his clumsiness.
- Cadet Zed McGlunk – The messy and unkempt hillbilly and former criminal. He usually drags his patrol partner, Sweetchuck along in his wily, but erratic pursuits.
- Cadet Moses Hightower – The group's strongman who is well known for his great size and strength. His stature often comes into play when the characters find themselves in situations in which bars must be bent or walls need to smashed through.
- Cadet Laverne Hooks – A small, soft-spoken, and passive woman. However, Hooks has shown herself capable of being extremely forceful and loud in situations in which she gets provoked. She is Hightower's patrol partner.
- Cadet Thomas "House" Conklin – A very obese man who is well known for his large frame, big appetite, and congenial nature. He patrols with Sweetchuck and Zed and often accompanies them in their escapades.
- Cadet Eugene Tackleberry – A weapons fanatic with a pronounced jawline who almost always wears sunglasses and a helmet. Tackleberry often uses the police's armored car, which he usually wrecks. He is fond of using a bazooka.
- Sergeant Debbie Callahan – The statuesque beauty of the group who is extremely resilient and has a beautiful singing voice. She has a weakness for her fellow patrol partner, Tackleberry.
- Captain Thaddeus Harris – The Police Academy's captain. Harris sometimes carries a walking stick around with him. He often tries to humiliate the officers in order to gain a promotion, but fails miserably.
- Sergeant Carl Proctor – Harris' dimwitted sergeant and sidekick who is almost always in the company of his captain.
- Sergeant Ernie Mauser - A sergeant and head of the K-9 corps. He became good friends with Mahoney and his gang. He acts similar to Hurst when facing up to Harris' shenanigans. He speaks in dog-like sounds.
- Commandant Eric Lassard – The easygoing and idealistic commandant.
- Finnegan - Commandant Lassard's loyal pet goldfish.
- The Professor – He is the inventor of numerous devices.
- K-9 Corps – A team of trained dogs. They can talk, but only to themselves and other animals.

=== Other characters ===
==== Villains (criminals) ====
- The Clown Gang - A trio of clown-themed criminals. Their plan is to sneak into the Police Academy and disguise themselves as new recruits for their looting schemes. They sometimes talk about their boss, Freddie The Fence.
  - Wiz - The trio's leader.
- The Claw - A wanted cat burglar who uses his gadgets to break into buildings and rob people of their jewelry. He speaks in cat-like sounds. He is a male parody of DC Comic's Catwoman.
  - Mouser - The Claw's loyal pet cat.
- Kingpin – The world's largest overlord in various episodes of the series. Together, him and the four escapees formed a supervillain teamup known as The Council of Crime. He is a parody of Marvel Comic's Kingpin. He is also drawn as overweight, bald, and always wearing a white suit.
  - Weasel & Wooley – Kingpin's low-level henchmen.
- The London Bridge Gang - A group of British crooks from London.
  - Hack London - The group's boss. His scheme is to use the Professor's new Supercar that they swiped so he could break into The Tower of London and steal the Royal Chalice.
  - Reggie McDuff & Leroy "Lugnut" Lonningan - London's henchmen. They stole the Supercar to get their boss out of jail.
- LeStarla - An obsessed fan who disguises himself as The Phantom of The Opera to kidnap an opera singer for his own selfish desires.
- Phoenix Amazona - An intelligent, but beautiful strongwoman who loves to take gold objects for money. She is Sweetchuck's former crush. She is also a parody of Marvel Comic's Titania.
  - Big Mike & Fuji - Amazona's wrestling henchmen.
- Seedy McLeech - An outlaw wanted by the old western town.
  - Snake, Maggot, & Annie Violey - McLeech's gang of bandits.
- Cleveland - A treasure hunter who impersonates a cursed mummy to scare everyone away and find King Fut's artifacts.
  - Kroak - One of Cleveland's henchmen.
- Numbskull - A not-too-bright thug who uses a few trick helmets to puncture through the walls of his robbery targets.
- Mr. Sleaze - An infamous crime boss with a weaponized necktie.
  - Beast - One of Sleaze's henchmen.
  - Foofoo - Sleaze's ugly, but loyal pet dog.
- The Highway Robbers - A gang of robbers and Zed's family.
  - Big Bertha - The leader of the Highway Robbers and Zed's aunt. She came up with the family recipe for Hokeyfenokee Stew.
  - Ned and Ed - Zed's long-lost cousins. They always race around the road in their souped-up hot rods.
- The Land Pirates - A gang of notorious gypsies.
  - Madame Zelda - A fake fortune teller and the gang's leader. She jinxes Sweetchuck with bad luck, until this so-called "curse" turns against her.
  - Lazlo & Grimsky - Two of Zelda's henchmen.
- Fredrick Wilhelm - A phony film director who wants to take a gigantic robot gorilla known as Awesome Ape for his heist ideas.
- The Magnificent Mystopholes - A crooked hypnotist who cures Hightower of his dentophobia and mesmerizes him to steal three special keys for a massive diamond known as the Cyclops' Eye.
  - Hunk - Mystopholes' short henchman.
- Lockjaw - A cyborg with crushing steel jaws that allows him to gnaw through anything inorganic. He used to have a crush on Callahan. He is a parody of He-Man & The Masters of The Universe's Trap Jaw.
- Dr. Vice - A doctor-turned-supervillain who overrode the space shuttle's controls so he could send his stolen paintings to the orbiting satellite. He is a parody of James Bond's Dr. No.
- Mr. Bimmelman - The owner of a toystore who is actually a spy plotting to steal top-secret documents with his dangerous and destructive toys. He is a parody of DC Comic's Toyman.
- Flung Hi - A martial artist and scientific genius with an arsenal of inventions he uses for his nefarious purposes.
- The Hang Ten Gang - A group of surfer-like thieves with hovering surfboards.
  - Brad - The group's leader.
  - Bambi - Brad's girlfriend.
  - Bull - Brad's friend who is as strong as Hightower.
- Kane - A high-tech crook who is trying to get specialized transistors hidden inside a rattle.
- Mr. Glitch - A suspected burglar who once stole a microchip from a space lab, but he drops it into Finnegan's fish bowl.
  - Cagey - Glitch's henchman.
- Waxen Wayne a.k.a. The Chameleon - The wax museum's curator and chemist who creates a special "wax formula" that allows him to mold his face into anyone he sees. He is a parody of Marvel Comic's The Chameleon.
- The Diamond Gang - A group of small-time gangsters. Their boss gave the Professor a Jeckyll-Hyde makeover, as well as altering his personality via Anti-Crime Formula so he can build weapons for them to pull off big jobs.
  - Sharky Diamond - The group's boss and grandson of Lucky Diamond.
- Muggsy Maggoy - A midget-sized mobster who was caught by the young Lassard after hiding one of the Emerald Wingtips which he took from a safe inside the jewelry store. 40 years later, he came out of retirement to finish the job.
- Skeets - A prison inmate at the state penitentiary who is the mastermind of the diamond thefts.
  - Louie - Skeets' henchman.
  - Lamar - One of Skeets' henchmen with size and strength equal to Hightower.
- The Neptune Gang - A group of criminals dressed as fish people to strip their victims of his or her valuables.
  - Mr. Bard a.k.a. King Neptune - The group's leader who dresses himself as a chef and the legendary king of the seas.
  - Romeo - Bard's henchman who dresses himself as a waiter and a fish man.
  - Juliet - Bard's henchwoman who dresses herself as a maid and a fish woman.
- The Gamester - A card-based villain who enjoys playing games, robbing everything, and leaving complex clues behind. He is a parody of DC Comic's Riddler.
  - Queenie - The Gamester's henchwoman and girlfriend.
  - Jester - The Gamester's henchman.

== Voice cast ==
=== Main ===
- Ron Rubin as Sgt Carey Mahoney
- Dan Hennessey as Officer Zed McGlunk / Sgt Eugene "Tack" Tackleberry
- Howard Morris as Officer Carl Sweetchuck / The Professor
- Greg Morton as Sgt Larvell Jones / Sgt Moses Hightower
- Len Carlson as Captain Thaddeus Harris
- Don Francks as Officer Thomas "House" Conklin / Lieutenant Carl Proctor
- Denise Pidgeon as Lieutenant Debbie Callahan / Sergeant Laverne Hooks
- Tedd Dillon as Commandant Eric Lassard

=== Additional ===
- R. Nelson Brown as Elwin Bixby
- Dorian Joe Clark
- Anthony Correa
- Gary Crawford
- Catherine Gallant
- Charles W. Gray
- Rex Hagon as Captain Ernie Mauser
- Elizabeth Hanna
- Suzette Myers as Anchor
- Greg Swanson
- Frank Welker
- Noam Zylberman as Bobby / Bill

== Episodes ==
=== Season 1 ===
No.	Title	Original release date
1	"The Good, the Bad, and the Bogus"	September 10, 1988
Captain Harris bungles an operation to catch the Clown Gang.
2	"The Phantom of the Precinct"	September 10, 1988
To stop a number of cat burglaries, Lassard brings a new squad in to save the day, the K-9 Corps.
3	"The Phantom of the Precinct"	September 10, 1988
Officers take extended leave because they fear a supposed phantom.
4	"Cops and Robots'"	September 10, 1988
Harris wants to replace human officers with the robots.
5	"Police Academy Blues"	September 17, 1988
Captain Harris replaces Lassard, who must step down at the academy. Mahoney and the gang aim to get Lassard reinstated.
6	"A Blue Knight at the Opera"	September 17, 1988
The officers are assigned to protect opera singer Mademoiselle Diva, after several assassination attempts.
7	"Worth Her Weight in Gold"	September 24, 1988
Unbeatable lady wrestler Amazona is on a crime spree in her free time. Sweetchuck offers to go undercover at her gym because he's fallen head over heels in love with her.
8	"For Whom the Wedding Bells Toll"	September 24, 1988
The Academy are assigned an undercover security mission at the wedding of a billionaire's daughter.
9	"Westward Ho Hooks"	September 24, 1988
Feeling unappreciated, Sergeant Hooks becomes the sheriff of a town being menaced by an outlaw gang.
10	"My Mummy Lies Over the Ocean"	October 1, 1988
Harris created "Operation Egypt" to protect a cursed mummy that is being returned to Egypt. Three crooks hope to steal the priceless artifact.
11	"Numbskull's Revenge"	October 1, 1988
Captured bank robber Numbskull swears revenge on Captain Harris. Numbskull is broken out by his accomplice, Ratzo.
12	"Proctor, Call a Doctor!"	November 16, 1988
Harris is in the hospital. Proctor becomes acting captain and is assisted by Sgt. Copeland. Mr. Sleaze kidnaps the Mayor.
13	"Little Zed & Big Bertha"	October 8, 1988
Zed discovers a couple of robbers are his own cousins and aunt. Zed gets hit on the head and, confused, he is tricked into joining the family's criminal activities.
14	"Curses on You!"	October 8, 1988
Sweetchuck arrests Madam Zelda for fraud, so she puts a spell on him. Now anyone close to Sweetchuck will have bad luck.
15	"Lights, Action, Coppers"	October 8, 1988
House is working security at Galaxy Studios, but the giant animatronic "Awesome Ape" is stolen and used to commit crimes.
16	"Camp Academy"	October 15, 1988
After Mahoney catches young Billy joyriding, he is sent to a camp for juvenile delinquents.
17	"The Tell Tale Tooth"	October 15, 1988
The Magnificent Mystopholes steals the Cyclops Diamond and plans to use it to hypnotize people to do his bidding.
18	"Mr. Sleaze Versus Lockjaw"	October 15, 1988
Mr. Sleaze swears revenge against Lockjaw when their criminal enterprises have the same target.
19	"Space Out Space Cadets"	October 22, 1988
The Space Program needs nine cops to fly an experimental space shuttle control vehicle into orbit, leading to some confusion about whether the gang landed on Mars.
20	"Sweetchuck's Brother"	October 22, 1988
Sweetchuck's brother Doug is an FBI agent who visits the Academy while on a case, leading to sibling rivalry.
21	"Karate Cop"	October 22, 1988
Jonesy loses his confidence after facing karate crook Flung Hi, so Mahoney arranged for Jonesy to get martial arts training.
22	"The Hang Ten Gang"	October 29, 1988
Zed develops a fear of water while buying a goldfish bowl for Lassard. The Professor gives the graduates new inventions to catch some criminal surfers that use hoverboards.
23	"Nine Cops and a Baby"	October 29, 1988
Mahoney's new neighbor asks him to babysit her niece. He gets his colleagues to help, but they don't realize that the crooks have hidden top secret transistors in the baby's rattle.
24	"Fish and Microchips"	October 29, 1988
Mahoney and Jones arrest Mr. Glitch, but can't find any evidence of theft from the Space Lab because Glitch fed the stolen microchip to Lassards' goldfish. After the fish is lost down the drain, the cops must find him.
25	"Precinct of Wax"	November 5, 1988
Kingpin hired Waxen "the Chameleon" Wayne to infiltrate the Governor's mansion. Wayne takes the Governor's place and orders the suspension of all police officers.
26	"Cop Scouts"	November 5, 1988
Mahoney, Billy, Gordo, and Sammie join the Cop Scouts to catch some young carjackers.

=== Season 2 ===
No.	Title	Original release date
1	"Professor Jekyll and Gangster Hyde"	November 5, 1988
The Professor invents a formula that turns criminals into honest people and vice versa. Sharky Diamond uses it on himself.
2	"Operation Big House"	November 12, 1988
Skeets oversees his criminal activities from jail, so Mahoney, Jones, Zed and Sweetchuck go undercover as inmates. Meanwhile, Lassard follows the first crook he ever arrested, Mugsy Malloy, who was just released from the same jail as Skeets.
3	"Kingpin's Council of Crime"	November 1, 1988
Kingpin and other prison escapees form a criminal organization. Their first planned heist: rob a train stocked with gold.
4	"Ship of Jewels"	November 12, 1988
Criminal King Neptune and his "minions of the seas" steal campaign funds from the mayor. Mahoney and his crew are on the case.
5	"Zillion Dollar Zed"	November 12, 1988
The Gamester attempts to rig the lottery, but is foiled by Zed. He becomes a millionaire and starts a new life of luxury.
6	"The Comic Book Caper"	November 19, 1988
Zed has a passion for comic books as the heroic Slimeboy. Meanwhile, three criminals disguise themselves as villains for a robbery.
7	"The Monkey Trial"	November 19, 1988
Zed makes friends with a monkey named Sally. Falcon, a bandit man-hawk hybrid, wants to get rid of the monkey because she knows of a secret tattoo.
8	"Rolling for Dollars"	November 19, 1988
Callahan is emotionally conflicted when she discovers that her old friend, Wheels Washowski, is one of the skating bandits terrorizing the city.
9	"K-9 Corps and the Peking Pooch"	November 26, 1988
The K-9 Corps investigate the theft of a museum's Peking Pooch, which is a treasure map of the Black Mountains. The dogs and the Cadets must stop the infamous thief, Fox.
10	"Santa with a Badge"	November 26, 1988
The cadets must prove a little girl's innocence after she is framed for stealing diamonds by the actual pair of thieves, but she's more concerned that other children believe in Santa Claus.
11	"Suitable for Framing"	November 26, 1988
Lady Fingers robs a jewelry store and frames Mahoney for the crime by using his fingerprints. The Professor and the cadets set out to prove Mahoney's innocence.
12	"Rock Around the Cops"	December 3, 1988
Jones becomes a rock and roll musician; Dread Ned, an arrogant and envious rocker, wants to get rid of Jones.
13	"Prince and the Copper"	December 3, 1988
Mahoney and the other officers guard the Indian Prince Merak, because the prince's sheikh uncle wants to capture the prince in order to steal his wealth.
14	"Now You Steal It, Now You Don't"	December 3, 1988
The magician Shandar uses a magic trick to make an armored truck disappear, but it was still empty. Bigger things start vanishing when the crew investigate the Magic Academy.
15	"Mad Maxine"	December 10, 1988
Harris is upset because the cadets have not yet caught Maxine and her warriors of the road.
16	"Trading Disgraces"	December 10, 1988
The grads are tested by Police Efficiency expert Krutchner. Harris suspends Tackleberry, and he is instructed to make Mr. Weazel a cop.
17	"Champ"	December 10, 1988
Lassard's niece Linda is going to the Olympic horse racing tryouts with her horse, Champ. Trouble arises when an Argentinean criminal uses one of Champ's horseshoes to smuggle gems into the US.
18	"Wheels of Fortune"	December 17, 1988
The Highway Robbers become new recruits in the police academy, which convinces Zed that his relatives have reformed. When the mayor's prized classic car is stolen by Mr. Sleaze, Zed's relatives are blamed. Zed and the cadets try to get the car back and prove Zed's family's innocence.
19	"The Wolf Who Cried Boy"	December 17, 1988
Zed and Sweetchuck discover a boy raised by wolves. Slick decides to train the wild boy to become a criminal.
20	"Snow Job"	December 17, 1988
Lassard and his cadets visit the mountains where they give ski lessons.
21	"A Bad Knight for Tackleberry"	December 24, 1988
Tackleberry no longer feels challenged by police-work. Gang leader Throttle wants revenge on Tack, and so he steals the Professor's latest invention: a helmet that can predict any opponent's next move. Throttle dresses up as a video game character called the "Black Knight" to fight Tack, kidnap Callahan, and take over the entire Academy.
22	"Supercop Sweetchuck"	December 24, 1988
Sweetchuck is hit on the head during a jewelry heist by the Humongo triplets, and now he thinks he's his favorite cop hero. He comes to believe that Commissioner Bates and Prof. Philper are his enemies.
23	"Deja Voodoo"	December 24, 1988
Sweetchuck and Zed are guarding the museum when Jaguar and his gang arrive. They steel a magical medallion and materials needed for voodoo dolls in their mission to control people.
24	"Flights of the Bumbling Blues"	December 31, 1988
Lassard's goldfish, Finnigan, was nabbed in a robbery on an airplane, so the graduates are put on guard in several other valuable airplanes to stop the thieves.
25	"Big Burger"	December 31, 1988
House discovers that the city's fast food restaurants are all being dominated by the Big Burger, and House vows to have him arrested.
26	"Fat City"	December 31, 1988
House will possibly leave the team after he fails to stop a theft. and others to explain who stole things. With his colleagues' help and House's friends, the Fat Boys, the group discovers the thief is Mr. Ego, a wealthy representative of high society.
27	"Elementary, My Dear Coppers!"	January 7, 1989
Zed and Sweetchuck set out to catch a diamond bandit after the kidnaping of a bride.
28	"Dr. Deadstone, I Presume"	January 7, 1989
Hightower discovers that a tattoo on his ankle is actually a secret map. Dr. Deadstone steals two pots of Shaba, and is trying to get hold of a mysterious diamond mine. Our heroes arrive in Africa to stop him.
29	"The Hillbilly Blues"	January 7, 1989
Zed and Sweetchuck returns to Zed's country to try to restore peace among his relatives, the Glunks and the Hagglepuss. As it turns out, the culprit behind the feud is Sheriff Hillbilly, who discovered a gold mine under land what is owned by the two families.
30	"Survival of the Fattest"	January 14, 1989
The Academy cadets try to protect The Fat Boys from a deranged fan.
31	"The Junkman Ransoms the Ozone"	January 14, 1989
John Lurid threatens to destroy the ozone layer with CFC-loaded rockets, unless the world pays him $50 million. It's up to the cadets to save humanity from global warming.
32	"Grads on Tour"	January 28, 1989
Mahoney and his friends get Mob Balsom into a federal prison, but he is then freed by another gang boss. In Yellowstone National Park, there's a showdown between the police and the bandits.
33	"Like Coppers, Like Son"	January 28, 1989
Gangster Clyde has developed an age-regression formula for only a short period, and uses it to escape prison with his friends, Bonnie and Butch. Now free, Clyde's first target is Tackleberry's grandfather.
34	"Ten Little Cops"	February 4, 1989
To get rid of the city's best policemen, Kingpin commissions writer Bagatha Crusties to write a novel that invites Mahoney and his friends to Bleak Island. The officers understand that it is a trap.
35	"Big Top Cops"	January 14, 1989
Hooks inherited her uncle's circus, but before she can takeover the family business, she must apprehend two criminals.
36	"Alpine K-9s"	January 21, 1989
Arriving in Europe, Callahan is coveted by Schubert Von Scheister, a prince with a large inheritance. The K-9 Corps try to rescue her.
37	"The Legend of Robin Good"	January 21, 1989
A criminal named Robin Good steals from the rich and keeps the spoils for himself, inverting the legend of Robin Hood.
38	"Hawaii Nine-0"	January 21, 1989
Mahoney and his friends are invited to a millionaire's mansion in Hawaii. The cadets have a great time until their host has been kidnapped.
39	"Thieves Like Us"	January 28, 1989
Mahoney much catch a thief by getting his former cellmate, Mulgrew, to help.

== In other languages ==
- Finnish: Poliisiopisto (Police Academy)
- Italian: Scuola di polizia (Police School)
- Spanish: Loca academia de policía/locademia de policía (Crazy Police Academy)
- Hungarian: Rendőrakadémia (Police College)
- Lithuanian: Policijos akademija (Police Academy)
- Arabic: أكاديمية الشرطة (Police Academy)
- Japanese: ポリスアカデミー (Police Academy)

== Other media ==
=== Home video releases ===
==== VHS ====
Police Academy was released through chronological volumes on VHS. At least 6 volumes were released, each including two episodes:

- 1° The Good, the Bad, and the Bogus + Cops and Robots
- 2° The Phantom of the Precinct + My Mummy Lies Over the Ocean
- 3° Worth Her Weight Gold + Westward Ho Hooks
- 4° Numbskull's Revenge + Mr. Sleaze Versus Lockjaw
- 5° Proctor, Call a Doctor! + Puttin' on the Dogs
- 6° Little Zed & Big Bertha + Lights, Action, Coppers

==== DVD ====
On December 11, 2012, Warner Archive released a DVD containing 30 episodes.

=== Action figures ===
Kenner produced a line of Police Academy action figures based on the animated series. Each features multiple points of articulation and comical accessories. Two accessories, included with Claw and Eugene Tackleberry, would be reused for the Joker figures in Kenner's Dark Knight Collection. Five of the vehicles and playsets planned were left unproduced; however, the Copper Corner playset would later be released through the Argentinian company Jocsa.

==== Series 1 (1988) ====
- Carey Mahoney and Samson Dog
- Claw with Mouser Cat
- Eugene Tackleberry with Armed Flak Vest
- Larvell Jones and Bullhorn
- Moses Hightower and Meter Reader Scooter
- Mr. Sleaze with Foofoo Dog
- Numbskull with Smashing Helmets
- Zed and Police Skateboard

==== Series 2 (1988) ====
- Captain Harris (mail-away)
- S.W.A.T. Eugene Tackleberry with Fistzooka
- Flung Hi with Crazy Karate Gear
- Kingpin with Thief-Trap Safe
- Karate Larvell Jones

==== Special Assignment Rookies (1989) ====
- Undercover Carey Mahoney
- Snack Attack House with Hoagie Blaster
- Stakeout Sweetchuck (mail-away)
- Sky Glidin' Zed with Hang Glider

==== Vehicles and playsets (1988) ====
- Crazy Cruiser
- Crash Cycle
- Precinct Police Station
- Copper Corner (released through Josco)

=== Comic books ===
Based on the cartoon series, Marvel Comics released six issues of a comic book series that published under the main company's name but also featured a "Star Comics Present' byline on the splash page.

== Stations ==
City	Station
Atlanta	WGNX 46
Baltimore	WNUV 54
Baton Rouge	WVLA 33
Bloomington	WYZZ 43
Boston	WLVI 56
Charlotte	WJZY 46
Chicago	WPWR 50
Cincinnati	WSTR 64
Cleveland	WBNX 55
Detroit	WXON 20
Dubuque	KOCR 28
Flint	WSMH 66
Fort Worth	KTXA 21
Green Bay	WGBA 26
Houston	KTXH 20
Huntsville	WZDX 54
Indianapolis	WXIN 59
Jacksonville	WNFT 47
Lexington	WDKY 56
Los Angeles	KCOP 13
Louisville	WBNA 21
Miami	WDZL 39
Milwaukee	WVTV 18
Minneapolis	KTMA 23
Montreal	CFJP 35
New York	WPIX 11
Norfolk	WTVZ 33
Oklahoma City	KOKH 25
Orlando	WKCF 18
Pensacola	WJTC 44
Philadelphia	WPHL 17
Phoenix	KUTP 45
Pittsburgh	WPTT 22
Providence	WPRI 12
Raleigh	WLFL 22
Red Deer	CKRD 6
Savannah	WJCL 22
Seattle	KTZZ 22
St. Louis	KDNL 30
Tampa Bay	WFTS 28
Toronto	CIII 41
Washington, D.C.	WDCA 20
Waterbury	WTXX 20
Winston-Salem	WNRW 45
York	WPMT 43
