= Batman: Rise of Sin Tzu =

2003 video game

- North American PlayStation 2 box art
- Developer: Ubi Soft Montreal
- Publisher: Ubi Soft
- Producer: Benoit Galarneau
- Designer: Mario Maltezos
- Artist: Daniel Marcoux
- Composer: Mathieu Vanasse
- Series: Batman
- Engine: RenderWare (GC, PS2, Xbox)
- Platforms: Xbox; PlayStation 2 Game Boy Advance; GameCube
- Release: October 16, 2003: Xbox; NA: October 16, 2003; EU: November 14, 2003 PlayStation 2; NA: October 16, 2003; EU: November 21, 2003 Game Boy Advance; NA: October 27, 2003 GameCube; NA: November 11, 2003; EU: December 5, 2003
- Genres: Action, beat 'em up
- Modes: Single-player, multiplayer

Batman: Rise of Sin Tzu is a 2003 action beat 'em up video game released for the Xbox, PlayStation 2, Game Boy Advance, and GameCube consoles. It was developed and published by Ubi Soft in conjunction with Warner Bros. Interactive Entertainment and DC Comics. The game is based on the television series The New Batman Adventures and features its voice cast reprising their roles. The story follows the Bat-Family (Batman, Nightwing, Batgirl, and Robin) as they face a new adversary, a superpowered Asian warlord called Sin Tzu, on the anniversary of Batman's parents' murder.

Batman: Rise of Sin Tzu was released in October 2003 to mixed reviews from critics. It was the final Batman video game based on the DC Animated Universe.

== Gameplay ==
Batman: Rise of Sin Tzu is a beat 'em up where players control either Batman (voiced by Kevin Conroy), Batgirl (Tara Strong), Robin (Scott Menville), or Nightwing (Loren Lester). While it can be played solo, the game also features a two-player cooperative multiplayer mode. Players can unlock upgrades for their character, such as new fighting moves, by completing levels and advancing through the game's storyline. There is also a challenge mode in which players (either cooperatively or competitively) take on groups of thugs without a storyline. The game features four difficulty settings: 'Easy', 'Medium', 'Hard', and 'Dark Knight', with the latter being an unlockable bonus.

The GameCube version includes support with the Game Boy Advance cable.

== Plot ==
On the anniversary of the murder of his parents, Thomas and Martha Wayne, Batman visits Crime Alley to pay his respects to them when he spots several civilians being kidnapped. After subduing the kidnappers, Batman learns of prison breakouts at both Arkham Asylum and Stonegate Prison and is called by Commissioner James Gordon (Bob Hastings), who asks him to meet at the courthouse to discuss the situation. However, Gordon is attacked by the Scarecrow (Jeffrey Combs) and exposed to his fear toxin; after defeating the Scarecrow, Batman is told by Gordon that more supervillains have broken out of prison and sets out to find them.

Notified that Clayface (Ron Perlman) has taken over the Gotham Chemical Factory, Batman defuses explosives planted across the rooftops of Gotham City and confronts Clayface, who reveals his plan to turn everyone in the city into clay creatures like himself. Batman follows Clayface to the chemical factory and, along the way, is informed by Gordon of a weapon of mass destruction being brought to Gotham. After defeating Clayface at the chemical factory, Batman again contacts Gordon and deduces that the person responsible for the prison breakouts is Sin Tzu (Cary-Hiroyuki Tagawa), an Asian warlord who was captured and sent to Arkham Asylum for further study.

Sin Tzu intercepts the transmission and declares that Gotham will become a new stronghold for his empire once Batman is defeated. Gordon then tells Batman that the doomsday weapon has arrived at the city docks, prompting the latter to intercept the cargo ship carrying it and bring it to the Batcave. As Batman finds the weapon, he is ambushed by Sin Tzu's men; he defeats them and attempts to disarm the weapon, only to discover it is actually Bane (Héctor Elizondo), another escaped supervillain, and that this was all part of Sin Tzu's plan to eliminate him. After defeating Bane, Batman discovers that Sin Tzu is hiding at Arkham Asylum and notifies Gordon, who has the police surround the asylum to prevent Sin Tzu's escape.

Batman infiltrates the asylum through the sewers and, along the way, is warned by Gordon about Sin Tzu's mind-control powers, which he used to manipulate the Scarecrow, Clayface, and Bane into fighting Batman. After making his way past Sin Tzu's men and several asylum inmates, including the Joker, Harley Quinn, Mr. Freeze, and Poison Ivy, who have been placed in suspended animation, Batman enters the asylum's lower levels, where he confronts and defeats Sin Tzu himself. Afterwards, he meets with Gordon a final time, who apologises for concealing Sin Tzu's existence but explains he had to do so for national security reasons. Batman understands and retreats to look over the city, where he reminisces of his vows to his loved ones and the memory of his parents' murder, which inspired him to become the man he is today.

== Marketing and release ==
One of the main draws to the game was its introduction of a new character to the Batman universe, similarly to how Batman: The Animated Series marked the debut of Harley Quinn, who became a mainstay of subsequent Batman stories. This new character, Sin Tzu, was designed by comic artist Jim Lee. However, Sin Tzu did not gain popularity as a character and was not seen in any other media, with the exception of the game's novelization, for thirteen years before making his comic debut in Suicide Squad Most Wanted: El Diablo and Killer Croc #3 (October 2016).

Batman: Rise of Sin Tzu was released on October 16, 2003, for the Xbox and PlayStation 2, on October 27 for the Game Boy Advance, and on November 11 for the GameCube in North America. In Europe, the Xbox version was released on November 14, 2003, the PlayStation 2 version was released on November 21, and the GameCube version was released on December 5. The game shipped with multiple editions, including a standard version containing just the game, boxed special editions for the Xbox and PlayStation 2 containing action figures, and a special GameCube edition that came with a bonus lithograph. Despite the special editions, Batman: Rise of Sin Tzu did not earn Greatest Hits, Player's Choice, or Platinum Hits on the PlayStation 2, GameCube, or Xbox, respectively.

== Other media ==
A novel based on the game, also titled Batman: Rise of Sin Tzu, was released in 2003. The novel, written by Devin Grayson and Flint Dille (who wrote the game's script), is told in the first person, with Clayface, the Scarecrow, a Stonegate inmate named Freddie Galan, Bane, a Hispanic thug named Ramon Domingo, Sin Tzu, Batman, Batgirl, Robin, Nightwing, and Alfred Pennyworth each providing the narration at different points.

Batman: Shadow of Sin Tzu was a year-long webcomic released bi-weekly on the DC Comics website, serving as a sequel to the events of Rise of Sin Tzu.

== Reception ==
Reception

Aggregate score
Aggregator	Score			
Aggregator	GBA	GameCube	PS2	Xbox
Metacritic	63/100	63/100	63/100	67/100

Review scores
Publication	Score			
Publication	GBA	GameCube	PS2	Xbox
1Up.com	N/A	N/A	N/A	7/10
Electronic Gaming Monthly	N/A	N/A	N/A	5.5/10
Game Informer	7/10	5/10	5/10	5/10
GamePro	N/A	N/A	3.5/5	N/A
GameSpot	N/A	7.5/10	7.5/10	7.5/10
GameSpy	2/5	N/A	2/5	2/5
GameZone	6.9/10	7/10	7.2/10	6.5/10
Hyper	N/A	69/100	69/100	69/100
IGN	5.5/10	6.5/10	6.5/10	6.5/10
Nintendo Power	3.4/5	3.4/5	N/A	N/A
Official U.S. PlayStation Magazine	N/A	N/A	2/5	N/A
Official Xbox Magazine (US)	N/A	N/A	N/A	6.1/10

Batman: Rise of Sin Tzu received "mixed or average reviews", according to review aggregator Metacritic.
