= List of Police Academy episodes =

Police Academy: The Series (or Police Academy: The Animated Series), is an American animated series produced by Ruby-Spears Enterprises in association with Warner Bros. Television, which was based on the franchise of the same name. Originally aired in syndication from September 10, 1988 from September 2, 1989, it was composed by 65 episodes divided into two seasons.

== Series overview ==
Season	Episodes	Originally released	
Season	Episodes	First released	Last released
1	26	September 10, 1988	October 15, 1988
2	39	October 22, 1988	September 2, 1989

== Episodes ==
=== Season 1 (1988) ===
No. overall	No. in season	Title	Written by	Original release date
1	1	"The Good, the Bad, and the Bogus"	Richard Merwin	September 10, 1988
When Captain Harris bungles an operation to catch the infamous Clown Gang, he is punished by being sent back to the Police Academy to train new recruits. Our favorite grads also return to the Academy under the watchful eye of Harris, but what happens when the Clown Gang enrolls as the Captain's new recruits? Safety Tip: Bicycle safety
2	2	"Puttin' on The Dogs"	Dorothy Middleton	September 11, 1988
To help combat a string of cat burglaries throughout the city, Commandant Lassard welcomes the latest addition to the Police Academy family, a group of police dogs known as the K-9 Corps. When the infamous Claw crashes a masquerade party and steals the Queen's crown during her royal visit, it's up to Mahoney and the gang to save the day, while trying to avoid Harris' and Proctor's attempts to shut down Lassard's pet project. Safety Tip: Using a pay phone in an emergency.
3	3	"The Phantom of the Precinct"	Michael Chain	September 12, 1988
More and more officers are being scared into taking extended leave, following ghostly encounters with the crooked Phantom. Captain Harris thinks this would be a great way to rid the force of a few certain individuals, and puts Mahoney and friends on the case. But when Sweetchuck is kidnapped by the Phantom, the team follows the trail to Hearse Castle, where they have to deal with a barrage of the Phantom's magic tricks to try and save their comrade. However, the secret to catching this ghastly ghoul might just rest with Sweetchuck himself. Safety Tip: What to do about entering a stranger's house.
4	4	"Cops and Robots"	Mark Jones	September 13, 1988
Captain Harris cooks up a hairbrained scheme to induct the Professor's new robots as police officers, replacing Mahoney and crew. But when Kingpin and his men abduct the Professor and force him to re-program the robots to aid his criminal activities, it's up to our heroes to make things right once again. Safety Tip: What to do in case of a house fire.
5	5	"Police Academy Blues"	Michael Maurer	September 14, 1988
When the London Bridge Gang swipes the Professor's Supercar during a police parade, Lassard is forced to step down as Commandant of the Academy, making way for his replacement - Commandant Harris. The British police call our favorite Academy grads for help, as they set out in search of the Supercar, in high hopes of getting their beloved former leader reinstated. Safety Tip: Crosswalk safety.
6	6	"A Blue Knight at the Opera"	Mark Edens	September 17, 1988
When the opera is plagued by numerous accidents, the team is called to protect opera singer Mademoiselle Diva. Mahoney's advances are rejected, as Diva is enamored with Tackleberry instead. During a performance attended by the Police Chief, Diva is kidnapped by the Phantom of the Opera. Lassard and House try to cover, making their stage debuts in the process. Safety Tip: Keeping parents informed of where you are.
7	7	"Worth Her Weight in Gold"	Richard Merwin	September 18, 1988
Callahan, Hooks and Zed are forced to pose as women wrestlers to combat alleged gold heist mastermind, strongwoman Phoenix Amazona; though our heroes' efforts may be jeopardized by Sweetchuck's apparent crush on the women's champion. Safety Tip: Safety around empty houses.
8	8	"For Whom the Wedding Bells Toll"	Mark Edens	September 19, 1988
A wealthy entrepreneur is intent on forcing his daughter to marry his business partner. While on duty at the reception, the grads meet Mahoney's childhood friend Ben, now the hired help, whom bride-to-be Debbie has fallen in love with instead. Ben's plans to save Debbie from her arranged marriage turn nasty, when the actors originally hired for a faux kidnapping decide to carry it out for real. Safety Tip: Using drugs, alcohol and cigarettes.
9	9	"Westward Ho Hooks"	Dorothy Middleton	September 20, 1988
Feeling stressed, overworked and underappreciated at the precinct, Hooks applies for, and lands, a new job as sheriff of an old western town. Upon arriving, she learns the town has been overrun by Seedy McLeech and his gang of assorted bandits. The Academy grads have their hands full as they saddle up to go after these crims, while trying to win Hooks back in the process. Safety Tip: Using 9-1-1.
10	10	"My Mummy Lies Over the Ocean"	Richard Mueller	September 21, 1988
To put an end to a curse, a museum curator seeks the help of the Academy grads to escort the mummy of an ancient Egyptian king, as it is shipped back to its rightful resting place, via a cruise liner. Our heroes also have to deal with not only a group of thugs who are trying to steal the mummy, but with the mummy itself who comes to life, causing panic on the cruise ship! Safety Tip: Don't hide from fires.
11	11	"Numbskull's Revenge"	Richard Merwin	September 24, 1988
During a bank robbery, the thick-headed Numbskull is caught by the equally cranial Captain Harris. However, Numbskull escapes from jail, seeking payback on Harris for his confinement. Harris is on the evening tv news, promising to catch Numbskull again, when a note from Numbskull hints at pulling off the biggest bank heist the city has seen yet. Will Harris be able to back up his words, or will he be eating them instead? Safety Tip: Babysitting tips.
12	12	"Proctor, Call a Doctor!"	Reed Shelly and Bruce Shelly	September 25, 1988
When Harris is injured and hospitalized, Proctor becomes Acting Captain for a day, and is forced to deal with a hostage crisis. The mayor has been kidnapped by Mr Sleaze, who wants his goons released from prison. The chase leads our heroes to an amusement park, where they scurry through loads of roller coasters, dodgem cars and haunted houses, in hot pursuit of the thugs. Safety Tip: Safety tips for staying home alone.
13	13	"Little Zed & Big Bertha"	Richard Merwin	September 26, 1988
When Zed tracks down the infamous Highway Robbers, he discovers them to be his long lost cousins, under the guidance of his Aunt Bertha. After they beat him up for being a cop, Zed suffers amnesia, and joins his family gang. Bertha sets out plans to rob an airplane full of money. But, when Sweetchuck & the team track them down, how will Zed respond? Safety Tip: Kitchen safety tips.
14	14	"Curses on You!"	George Hampton and Mike Moore	September 27, 1988
The PA grads have their hands full with a gang of notorious gypsies known as the Land Pirates, while also becoming victims of a string of curses set by the Pirates' fortune teller, Madame Zelda. When Mahoney gives Sweetchuck a 'magical orb' to offset the jinx, their luck seems to take a turn for the better, but is that really the case? Safety Tip: Making a homemade splint.
15	15	"Lights, Action, Coppers!"	Michael Maurer	September 28, 1988
Assigned to night duty at Galaxy Studios, movie buff House becomes caught up in a phony film director's plot to steal a giant animatronic robot of Awesome Ape, causing chaos throughout the city as the bad guys pull a string of heists using the monster movie star. Safety Tip: Halloween safety.
16	16	"Camp Academy"	Michael Chain	October 1, 1988
Commandant Lassard opens a new summer camp for underprivileged inner city youths, attended by the likes of rebellious teen Bobby & friends. Mahoney and crew have a difficult time gaining the youngsters' trust, but they have to unite as a team in order to stop a group of neighborhood criminals from trying to sabotage the camp's activities. Safety Tip: Using the buddy system.
17	17	"The Tell Tale Tooth"	Dorothy Middleton	October 2, 1988
When a massive diamond -- The Cyclops' Eye -- is brought to town for an exhibition, Harris is in charge of a security team protecting the diamond case, which can only be opened using a combination of three keys. Harris gives one to the Police Chief for safekeeping, one to Commandant Lassard, and keeps the third himself. But the Magnificent Mystopholes hypnotises Hightower under the pretense of curing his fear of dentists, while actually using him to steal the three keys to unlock the Cyclops' Eye diamond case, aiding his twisted plot of mass hypnosis. Safety Tip: What to do in case of shock.
18	18	"Mr. Sleaze Versus Lockjaw"	Reed Shelly and Bruce Shelly	October 3, 1988
Lt. Callahan becomes the object of affection for one Lockjaw, who is also embroiled in a bitter turf war with Mr. Sleaze after muscling in on his territory. When Sleaze captures Callahan so he can blackmail Lockjaw into handing him all of his stolen loot, it's up to our heroes to save Debbie (and the day, once again). Safety Tip: Halloween safety.
19	19	"Spaced Out Space Cadets"	Gary Greenfield	October 4, 1988
Along with Proctor, Harris is accidentally locked on board a space shuttle with our heroes, whom Harris has enrolled in a nine month space program. But moments after takeoff, the shuttle's controls are overridden by an unknown source. They are forced to land in the Amazon jungle, where Harris & Proctor, while looking for answers, are taken captive by mysterious tribesmen. Safety Tip: Halloween safety.
20	20	"Sweetchuck's Brother"	Pamela Hickey and Dennys McCoy	October 5, 1988
Sweetchuck hides from his FBI agent brother Doug when he comes to the Academy looking for assistance in nabbing a wanted spy. The grads discover Sweetchuck's insecurities, as Doug is bigger, stronger, more confident, and seemingly better at everything than his older brother. Dressed as criminals, Mahoney, Jones, Tackleberry & House set up a mock robbery in hopes that Sweetchuck will capture them, showing his brother just how tough he really is. But when their plans go awry, Doug is captured by the spy he's been looking for, and Sweetchuck finds himself in a very real situation. Safety Tip: Earthquake preparedness kits.
21	21	"Karate Cop"	Richard Merwin	October 8, 1988
Jones finds help from his old karate teacher Master Shiro, after his karate skills seem to be diminished, following a botched encounter with some Japanese bad guys at the local power plant. Master Shiro's former student Flung Hi (I kid you not) is carrying out his plans to harness various energy sources, in his ultimate quest to take over the city. Jones must train harder to regain his confidence, as he prepares to face his nemesis in the inevitable showdown. Safety Tip: Safety around downed power lines.
22	22	"The Hang Ten Gang"	Ken Knox	October 9, 1988
While shopping for a new goldfish for Commandant Lassard's birthday, Sweetchuck discovers that Zed has a fear of water. An eavesdropping Proctor eagerly relays this news to Captain Harris, who says this information is all he needs to oust Zed from the force. But first, they have to deal with a group of hoverboard riding burglars known as the Hang Ten Gang. After making off with both a ton of cash and Zed's girlfriend, the chase leads our heroes over land, air and (gasp)...water! Can Zed face his fear and beat these surfer dudes at their own game? Or will he have to endure the sounds of Harris and Proctor singing 'Goodbye'? Safety Tip: How to treat wounds.
23	23	"Nine Cops and a Baby"	Meg McLaughlin	October 10, 1988
Mahoney plays babysitter for the day, when asked to take care of the new neighbor's baby, Nellie. What he doesn't know is that high-tech criminals are trying to steal top-secret transistors hidden in Nellie's rattle, before Aunt Mona delivers them to the government. But when baby Nellie wanders out of the building with the rattle, a wild goose chase involving both crooks and cops ensues throughout the city. One must wonder, which poses a bigger challenge for the P.A. grads; nailing bad guys, or changing diapers? Safety Tip: Crime in the neighborhood.
24	24	"Fish and Microchips"	Reed Shelly and Bruce Shelly	October 11, 1988
When a suspected space lab burglar, Mr. Glitch, is taken in for questioning, he drops a stolen microchip into a goldfish bowl, where it is swallowed by Lassard's pet goldfish Finnegan. After Glitch is let go for lack of evidence, it's a race between cops and robbers to find the chip, after Finnegan is accidentally sent down the drain. Safety Tip: Electrical safety around the bathtub.
25	25	"Precinct of Wax"	Matt Uitz	October 12, 1988
Wax museum curator Waxen Wayne has a special formula that allows him to mold his face to look like anyone. Along with Kingpin, they devise a fiendish plot to do away with the governor, so that Kingpin can be free to do as he pleases throughout the city. After the governor is kidnapped and replaced with a lookalike (Waxen Wayne in disguise), the police are shocked to hear what the "governor" really wants -- no more cops! To make matters worse, Sweetchuck and Zed are also captured, as Kingpin prepares to transform the three into wax statues... Safety Tip: Stop, drop and roll
26	26	"Cop Scouts"	Francis Moss	October 15, 1988
Kingpin's people have stolen the crown jewels of Ruritania, hiding them in an Edsen car that is shipped to the city. However, Kingpin doesn't know which car contains the merchandise, so he hires teenagers to steal every Edsen in the city, until they can find the goods. Meanwhile, young Billy and his friends are the first to join Lassard's new Cop Scout program. Their mission is to help Mahoney and friends infiltrate the car theft ring, and bring the criminals to justice. Safety Tip: The poison prevention hotline.

=== Season 2 (1988–89) ===
No. overall	No. in season	Title	Written by	Original release date
27	1	"Professor Jekyll and Gangster Hyde"	Matt Uitz	October 22, 1988
The Professor invents a formula that turns criminals into honest people and vice versa as Sharky Diamond and his Diamond Gang use it to turn him into part of the wrong crowd. Safety Tip: Halloween safety.
28	2	"Operation Big House"	Doug Molitor	October 29, 1988
Mahoney, Jones, Zed and Sweetchuck go undercover in the state penitentiary to find the mastermind of the diamond thefts. Meanwhile, Lassard learns that his first arrest, Muggsy Maggoy, is being released by hunches that he maybe the missing link to the crime. Lassard tails him to prove his old man status is still worthy of being a cop, before the trail leaves him permanently retired. Safety Tip: Fire safety.
29	3	"Kingpin's Council of Crime"	Sean Roche	November 1, 1988
Kingpin and the rest of the escapees: Claw, Amazona, Lockjaw, Numbskull and Mr. Sleaze, form the council of crime, a criminal organization. They want to commit a big train robbery to steal the world's largest amount of gold. Safety Tip: What to do in case of a fall. Note: This episode was produced and aired in European countries (especially in Italy), but did not air in the United States until June 27th, 2024 when it aired for the first time on MeTV Toons.
30	4	"Ship of Jewels"	Len Levitt and Phil Baron	November 2, 1988
A criminal by the name of King Neptune and his minions of the seas have stolen campaign funds for the mayor's re-election. It's up to Mahoney and his crew to solve the case before it gets even fishier. Safety Tip: Electrical safety.
31	5	"Zillion Dollar Zed"	John Cooksey and Ali Marie Matheson	November 3, 1988
The Gamester's attempt to rig the lottery is foiled by Zed, who ends up becoming a millionaire and starts a new life of luxury with his poodle Eggplant. But Zed must quickly learn which is the most irreplaceable thing he has before the Gamester succeeds by taking back Zed's money. Safety Tip: Water rescue techniques.
32	6	"The Comic Book Caper"	John Cooksey and Ali Marie Matheson	November 4, 1988
Zed's got a passion for comic books as the heroic Slimeboy. Meanwhile, three criminals disguise themselves as villains: Dr. Moron, Miss Bomb and Marsupialman, in order to imitate the moves of the bad guys for a robbery. But Mahoney and his friends have a big surprise for the bad guys.
33	7	"The Monkey Trial"	Cherie Wilkerson	November 5, 1988
Zed befriends a monkey named Sally, but Falcon, a bandit man-hawk hybrid wants to get rid of the monkey, who knows of a secret tattoo. Safety Tip: Treating burns.
34	8	"Rolling for Dollars"	Reed and Bruce Shelly	November 8, 1988
Callahan happens to discover that her old best friend Wheels Washowski is one of the female skating bandits that's terrorizing the city. But can she forgive her own old friend for turning bad? Safety Tip: What to do if someone is choking.
35	9	"K-9 Corps and the Peking Pooch"	Richard Merwin	November 9, 1988
The K-9 Corps are investigating the theft of the museum's Peking Pooch by the infamous Fox, whereas it happens to be a treasure map that leads to the Black Mountains. But will the dogs, with the Cadets' help, be able to stop him? Safety Tip: Calling 911 or "0" (Operator) for assistance.
36	10	"Santa with a Badge"	Michael Chain	November 10, 1988
A little girl named Ginny asks Mahoney and his gang to help her friends to believe in Santa Claus, but first the cadets must prove her innocence after being framed for stealing diamonds by the actual pair of thieves. Safety Tip: Pool safety.
37	11	"Suitable for Framing"	John Vornholt and Steven Robertson	November 11, 1988
The uncatchable Lady Fingers robs a jewelry store and frames Mahoney for the crime by using his fingerprints. Can the Professor and the cadets prove Mahoney's innocence? Safety Tip: Safety when reaching out of reach places.
38	12	"Rock Around the Cops"	Unknown	November 12, 1988
Jones becomes a great rocker, but an arrogant and envious musician named Dread Ned wants to get rid of him, to win the grand prize at a rock concert. Safety Tip: Bicycle hand signals.
39	13	"Prince and the Copper"	Michael Chain	November 15, 1988
Mahoney and his friends must keep an eye on Prince Merak, after arriving from India. But the prince's uncle, a sheik wants to capture the prince in order to steal his wealth. Safety Tip: Finding the safest way to school.
40	14	"Now You Steal It, Now You Don't"	Michael O'Mahoney	November 16, 1988
Mahoney, Jones, Zed, Sweetchuck and House discover the incredible Shandar, a magician with a disappearing act, who stole an armored truck and hides out at a magic school. Then they must protect a ship carrying gold, but Harris and Proctor, try to follow them and take all the credit. Safety Tip: Preventing animal bites.
41	15	"Mad Maxine"	Gary Greenfield	November 17, 1988
A furious Harris is upset because the cadets have not yet caught Maxine and her gang. Safety Tip: Healthy snacking.
42	16	"Trading Disgraces"	Ted Field	November 18, 1988
Tackleberry is suspended and Harris is reassigned per the advice of an efficiency expert. Who or what could be behind this turn of events? Safety Tip: The effect of smoking cigarettes.
43	17	"Champ"	Matt Uitz	November 19, 1988
A trio of Argentinian bandits uses Lassard's granddaughter Linda's horse Champ to smuggle in diamonds into the U.S. After they steal the horse to retrieve the diamonds, it's up to our heroes to rescue Champ and stop the bandits. Safety Tip: Wearing seatbelts.
44	18	"Wheels of Fortune"	Douglas Booth	November 22, 1988
The Highway Robbers become new recruits in the police academy, a fact that makes Zed convinced his relatives have reformed, but when the mayor's prized classic car is stolen by Mr. Sleaze, Zed's relatives are blamed. Will Zed and the cadets get the car back and prove Zed's relative's innocence? Safety Tip: Dangers of empty fields.
45	19	"The Wolf Who Cried Boy"	Gary Greenfield	November 23, 1988
While the cadets are on the trail of Slick and his gang, Zed and Sweetchuck meet a boy raised by wolves. Zed decides to teach the boy as they should, while Slick and his gang are planning to commit a heist at the St. James Hotel. Safety Tip: Don't take candy or gifts from strangers.
46	20	"Snow Job"	Len Levitt and Phil Baron	November 24, 1988
Lassard and his cadets go up to the mountains where they give ski lessons. But a clever crime family's behind a series of avalanches as it's up to our heroes to stop them and save the day. Safety Tip: Stunts
47	21	"A Bad Knight for Tackleberry"	Sean Roche	November 25, 1988
Tackleberry becomes convinced that his good deeds are no longer working when he fails to hit the Black Knight. He decides to train with his uncle up in the mountains, while one of the Throttle Gang's members who's wearing a black knight costume attempts to attack Tackleberry.
48	22	"Supercop Sweetchuck"	Michael Chain	November 26, 1988
Sweetchuck becomes his favorite cop hero after getting hit on the head by accident during a jewelry heist by the Humongo triplets. Things take a turn when he believes that Commissioner Bates (the actual head of the Humongos gang) and Prof. Philper are his archenemies.
49	23	"Deja Voodoo"	Matt Uitz	May 17, 1989
Sweetchuck and Zed are assigned to guard the museum, when suddenly Jaguar and his gang arrive. They steal a magical medallion and materials needed for voodoo dolls and objects to control people.
50	24	"Flights of the Bumbling Blues"	Ted Field	May 24, 1989
Harris sternly warns Mahoney to arrest three hijackers consisting of Mr. Corak and his henchmen after a robbery on a plane happens. Meanwhile the cadets are on a mission to find Lassard's fish which ends up being kidnapped by the three villains, while Hightower conquers his fear of heights.
51	25	"Big Burger"	Gary Greenfield	May 21, 1989
House discovers that all the city's fast food joints are dominated by Big Burger, a wealthy joint owner of burgers, and House vows to have him arrested. Safety Tip: Never leave a pet dog inside a car when the weather is hot and summery
52	26	"Fat City"	Unknown	May 28, 1989
Although Harris is always on guard, House is likely to leave the team after failing to stop a strange theft. Mahoney and the others try to figure out who's behind these thefts. With their help, and House's old friends, the Fat Boys, they discover the thief is none other than Mr. Ego, a representative of the high society, extremely rich, powerful and smart.
53	27	"Elementary, My Dear Coppers!"	Unknown	June 4, 1989
Zed and Sweetchuck follow in Sherlock Holmes's shoes to catch the diamond bandit after kidnapping Samantha a soon to be bride. In the end, they find that the kidnapper of the bride is actually a woman.
54	28	"Dr. Deadstone, I Presume"	Sean Roche	June 11, 1989
Hightower discovers a tattoo on his ankle which is actually a secret map, and thinks there could be a treasure of sorts. Meanwhile Dr. Deadstone steals the two pots of Shaba, while he's also trying to get hold of a mysterious diamond mine. But our heroes, who've arrived in Africa, are there to stop him.
55	29	"The Hillbilly Blues"	Matt Uitz	June 18, 1989
Zed and Sweetchuck returns to Zed's country home to try to restore peace among his relatives, the Glunks and the Hagglepuss. Actually, the culprit behind the perpetual struggle is sheriff Hillbilly, who discovered a gold mine underneath a piece of land owned by the two families and planned to gain possession of it by pitting the families against each other.
56	30	"Survival of the Fattest"	Doug Molitor	June 25, 1989
Mahoney and co. are on guard duty to protect Princess Lontal of Sal who remains in the United States to see the Fat Boys, House's old friends. This however, earns the envy of the princess's bodyguard Noxo, who plans to marry her and take over the throne.
57	31	"The Junkman Ransoms the Ozone"	Sean Roche	July 1, 1989
John Lurid, a first-order junk environmentalist threatens to destroy the ozone layer with CFCs-loaded rockets, unless the world pays him a $50 million ransom. It's up to Mahoney and co. to save humanity from global warming.
58	32	"Grads on Tour"	Ted Field	July 8, 1989
Mahoney and his friends get Mob Balsom into a federal prison, only to be freed by a boss from another gang. High above the skies of South Dakota and Mount Rushmore a dogfight between the police and the bandits unfolds.
59	33	"Like Coppers, Like Son"	Unknown	July 15, 1989
A criminal gang leader named Clyde has developed an age-regression formula that can only last for a short period of time, and manages to escape prison together with his goons, Bonnie and Butch. But he's got to go up against Tackleberry and his energetic grandfather, his old nemesis.
60	34	"Ten Little Cops"	Richard Merwin	July 22, 1989
To get rid of the academy's best policemen on the street, Kingpin commissions Bagatha Crusties an author to write a novel along with inviting Mahoney and his friends to Bleak Island, along with trying to catch him. But the officers realize that it is a trap, and in the end they manage to stop Kingpin. Safety Tip: Children in parked cars
61	35	"Big Top Cops"	Sean Roche	July 29, 1989
Hooks inherits her uncle's circus, but before she can start going into business, she must apprehend two criminals that are employed with her uncle's circus, which makes their lives more difficult.
62	36	"Alpine K-9s"	Unknown	August 4, 1989
Arriving in Europe, Callahan is coveted by Schubert Von Scheister, a half prince who's trying to take up a large inheritance, to make an appeal. But Callahan ends up being kidnapped as it's up to our heroes and the K-9 Corps to rescue her, meanwhile Bonehead falls in love with a female St. Bernard. Safety Tip: Earthquake
63	37	"The Legend of Robin Good"	Richard Merwin	August 11, 1989
A criminal named Robin Good steals from the richest of the rich and keeps the loot for himself, with an unscrupulous journalist as an accomplice of his. Meanwhile Mahoney and his friends want to have a team of experts oppose the bill and the law.
64	38	"Hawaii Nine-0"	Gary Greenfield	August 18, 1989
Mahoney and his friends are invited by a millionaire to guard his mansion in Hawaii. The cadets feel almost like they're in paradise, but unfortunately the man's been kidnapped as it's up to our heroes to save the day. Safety Tip: Stuck elevator
65	39	"Thieves Like Us"	Richard Merwin	September 2, 1989
Tex happens to be robbing armored cars and stealing the loot as well. Mahoney knows there's one person who's the right man for the job: Tex's own cellmate Mulgrew. Safety Tip: Wear headphones while on a bicycle.
