= List of Nelvana programs =

This is a list of films, shows and specials involving production or distribution by the Canadian production studio Nelvana, a subsidiary of Corus Entertainment.

== Feature films ==
=== Theatrical ===
- Rock & Rule (1983) (with United Artists and Famous Players)
- The Care Bears Movie (1985) (with American Greetings and Those Characters from Cleveland, LLC)
- Care Bears Movie II: A New Generation (1986) (with LBS Communications and Those Characters from Cleveland, LLC)
- The Care Bears Adventure in Wonderland (1987)
- Burglar (1987) (live-action)
- Babar: The Movie (1989, with Ellipse Programme and The Clifford Ross Company)
- Malice (1993) (with New Line Cinema and Castle Rock Entertainment) (live-action; uncredited)
- Spaceman (1997) (live-action)
- Pippi Longstocking (1997) (with Svensk Filmindustri, IdunaFilm and TFC Trickompany)
- Babar: King of the Elephants (1999) (with TMO-Loonland Film GmbH)
- Heidi (2005) (with TV-Loonland AG, Telemagination and Corus Entertainment) (released theatrically in Germany)
- Franklin and the Turtle Lake Treasure (2006) (with StudioCanal, Alphanim, Les Studios DSO, Europool and LuxAnimation)

=== Direct-to-video ===
- The Legend of the North Wind (1997) (with Episa and Euskal Pictures International) (English dubbed version)
- Donkey Kong Country: The Legend of the Crystal Coconut (1999) (with Medialab Studio L.A. and WIC Entertainment Ltd.)
- Cardcaptors: The Movie (2000) (with Madhouse) (English dubbed version)
- Redwall: The Movie (2000) (with Alphanim, Molitor Productions and United Productions) (edit of Series 1 of Redwall)
- Franklin and the Green Knight (2000)
- Franklin's Magic Christmas (2001)
- The Little Bear Movie (2001) (with Wild Things Productions)
- Rolie Polie Olie: The Great Defender of Fun (2002) (with Sparkling* Animation)
- Rolie Polie Olie: The Baby Bot Chase (2003) (with Sparkling* Animation)
- Back to School with Franklin (2003)
- Rescue Heroes: The Movie (2003)
- Care Bears: Journey to Joke-a-lot (2004, with American Greetings, Mainframe Entertainment and Sparx Animation)
- Beyblade: Fierce Battle (2005, English dubbed version)
- The Care Bears' Big Wish Movie (2005, with American Greetings and Mainframe Entertainment)
- Mike the Knight: Journey to Dragon Mountain (2014) (with HIT Entertainment)

=== Other ===
- Voulez-vous coucher avec God? (1972)
- 125 Rooms of Comfort (1974) (titles)
- Jefferson Starship (1983) (with East Media for RCA VideoDiscs) (live-action)
- Grace Under Pressure Tour (1986) (rear screen films)
- Three Amigos (1986) (with HBO Pictures and L.A. Films) (animation)
- The Return of the North Wind (1994) (with Episa and Euskal Pictures International) (distribution licensing)
- Attack of the Killer B-Movies (1995) (live-action)

== Television specials ==
- Christmas Two Step (1975) (combining live-action and animation)
- A Cosmic Christmas (1977)
- The Devil and Daniel Mouse (1978) (with Canadian Broadcasting Corporation)
- How We Made The Devil and Daniel Mouse (1978)
- Star Wars Holiday Special (1978) (with Smith-Hemion Productions, Winters Hollywood Entertainment Holdings Corporation, The Star Wars Corporation and 20th Century Fox Television) (live-action; "The Faithful Wookiee" animated segment)
- Romie-0 and Julie-8 (1979)
- Intergalactic Thanksgiving (1979)
- Easter Fever (1980) (with Topcraft)
- Take Me Up to the Ball Game (1980)
- The Magic of Herself the Elf (1983) (with Scholastic Entertainment and Those Characters from Cleveland)
- Strawberry Shortcake: Housewarming Surprise (1983) (with MAD Productions and Those Characters from Cleveland)
- Strawberry Shortcake and the Baby Without a Name (1984) (with MAD Productions and Those Characters from Cleveland)
- The Get Along Gang (1984) (with DIC Audiovisuel) (pilot)
- Strawberry Shortcake Meets the Berrykins (1985)
- Atkinson Film-Arts television specials (distributor):
  - The Body Electric (1985)
  - Rumpelstiltskin (1985) (with Animated Investments, Inc., Telefilm Canada and CTV Television Network, Ltd.)
  - The Velveteen Rabbit (1985)
  - For Better or For Worse: The Bestest Present (1985)
  - Babar and Father Christmas (1986)
  - The Tin Soldier (1986)
  - The Nightingale (1987)
- The Great Heep (1986)
- Madballs: Escape from Orb! (1986)
- My Pet Monster (1986)
- The Wild Puffalumps (1987)
- The Rocket Boy (1987) (with Orion Television) (live-action)
- Spies, Lies & Naked Thighs (1988) (main title design)
- Care Bears Nutcracker Suite (1988)
- HBO Storybook Musicals (1991) ("The Tale of Peter Rabbit")
- The Rosey and Buddy Show (1992)
- Santa's First Christmas (1992) (with EVA Entertainment, Siriol Productions, and S4C)
- The Incredible Crash Dummies (1993) (with Lamb and Company, Tyco, and Fox Kids)
- The Santa Claus Brothers (2001) (with Sitting Ducks Productions and Film Roman)
- Miss Spider's Sunny Patch Kids (2003)
- Miss Spider's Sunny Patch Friends: The Prince, the Princess and the Bee (2006)
- A Franklin and Friends Adventure: Polar Explorer (2014)
- A Franklin and Friends: Deep Sea Voyage (2014)
- Lucky Duck (2014) (with Disney Junior)
- Thomas & Friends: Race for the Sodor Cup (2021) (with Mattel Television)
- Thomas & Friends: Mystery at Lookout Mountain (2023) (with Mattel Television)
- This Was Our Pact (TBA) (with Duncan Studio and Estuary Films) - direct-to-streaming

== Television series ==
Series	Creator(s) / Developer(s)	Year(s)	Production partner	Network	Notes
1970s
Small Star Cinema		1974–1975		CBC Television	
1980s
Mr. Microchip		1983		CBC Television	
20 Minute Workout	Ron Harris	1983–1985	Orion Entertainment Corporation; Chumcity	Citytv (Canada); Syndication (United States)	
Inspector Gadget	Bruno Bianchi; Andy Heyward; Jean Chalopin	1983	DIC Audiovisuel; Lexington Broadcast Services Company	First Choice Superchannel (Canada); FR3 (France); Syndication (United States)	season 1 only
The Edison Twins	Michael Hirsh; Patrick Loubert	1984–1986		CBC Television	
Ewoks	Paul Dini; Bob Carrau	1985–1986	Lucasfilm	Global (Canada); ABC (United States)	
Star Wars: Droids	Peter Sauder; Ben Burtt	1985–1986	Lucasfilm	Global (Canada); ABC (United States)	
The Care Bears Family	Linda Denham; Elena Kucharik	1986–1988	C.B.I.S. Productions; American Greetings	Global (Canada); ABC (seasons 1–2) / Syndication (season 3; United States)	
Madballs		1986–1987	AmToy	Direct-to-video	
Scholastic's Blue Ribbon Storybook Video		1986	Scholastic Productions; Karl-Lorimar Home Video	Direct-to-video	
Cricket's Club		1986–1987	Hi-Tops Video	Direct-to-video	
My Pet Monster	Peter Sauder	1987	Telefilm Canada	Global (Canada); ABC (United States)	
T. and T.	Michael Hirsh; Elia Katz; Patrick Loubert	1988–1990	Hal Roach Studios (season 1); Qintex Entertainment (seasons 2–3)	Global (Canada); Syndication (seasons 1–2) / The Family Channel (season 3; United States)	
Clifford the Big Red Dog		1988	Scholastic Productions	Direct-to-video	
Babar		1989–1991; 2001	The Clifford Ross Company; Ellipsanime (season 6); Kodansha (season 6)	CBC Television (seasons 1–3) / Family Channel (seasons 4–5) / TVO/Knowledge Network (season 6; Canada); Canal+ (seasons 1–5) / France 3 (France); HBO (United States)	
Beetlejuice	Beetlejuice by: Michael McDowell; Larry Wilson; (d): Tim Burton	1989–1991	Tim Burton Inc. The Geffen Film Company; Warner Bros. Television	Global (Canada); ABC (seasons 1–3) / Fox Kids Network (season 3; United States)	
1990s
Little Rosey	Roseanne Barr	1990	Little Rosey Productions, Inc.	ABC	
The Adventures of Tintin	Stéphane Bernasconi	1991–1992	Ellipse Programme	Global (Canada); FR3/France 3 (France); Nickelodeon/HBO (United States)	
Rupert		1991–1997	Ellipse Programme (seasons 1–3); TVS Television (season 1); Scottish Television (seasons 2–5)	YTV (Canada); France 3 (seasons 1–3; France); ITV (United Kingdom); Nickelodeon (United States)	
Fievel's American Tails	David Kirschner	1992–1993	Amblin Television; Universal Cartoon Studios	CBS	
Dog City	Peter Sauder; J.D. Smith	1992–1994	The Jim Henson Company	Fox Kids Network (United States); Global/YTV (Canada)	
Eek! The Cat/Eek! Stravaganza	Savage Steve Holland; Bill Kopp	1992–1997	Savage Studios Ltd. Fox Children's Productions	Fox Kids (United States); YTV (Canada)	
Family Dog	Brad Bird	1993	Amblin Television; Tim Burton Productions; Universal Television; Warner Bros. Television	CBS	
Cadillacs and Dinosaurs	Steven E. de Souza	1993–1994	Galaxy Films; De Souza Productions	YTV (Canada); CBS (United States)	
Tales from the Cryptkeeper	Libby Hinson; Ben Joseph	1993–1994; 1999	Fantome Animation (season 3)	YTV (seasons 1–2) / Teletoon (season 3; Canada); ABC (seasons 1–2) / CBS (season 3; United States)	
The Legend of the North Wind		1994	Episa and Euskal Pictures International	Trio	distribution licensing
RoboCop: The Series	Edward Neumeier; Michael Miner	1994	Rysher Entertainment; Skyvision Entertainment; Rigel Entertainment	CTV (Canada); Syndication (United States)	"Commander Cash" animated sequences
Free Willy	Patrick Loubert; Patsy Cameron; Ted Anasti	1994–1995	Regency Enterprises; Le Studio Canal+ Donner/Shuler-Donner Productions; Warner Bros. Television	Global (Canada); ABC (United States)	
Wild C.A.T.s	Jim Lee; Brandon Choi (d): Bob Forward; David Wise	1994–1995	WildStorm Productions	CBS	
The Magic School Bus	The Magic School Bus by: Joanna Cole; Bruce Degen; (d): Alison Blank; Kristin Laskas Martin; Jane Startz	1994–1997	South Carolina ETV; Scholastic Productions	PBS	
Nancy Drew		1995		Syndication	
The Hardy Boys	David Cole	1995–1996	Marathon Productions; Westcom Entertainment Group Ltd. France 2	Syndication	
The Neverending Story	Peter Sauder	1995–1996	CineVox Entertainment; Ellipse Programme	Family Channel (Canada); HBO (United States)	
Ace Ventura: Pet Detective	Ace Ventura by Jack Bernstein (d): Duane Capizzi	1995–1997	Morgan Creek Productions; Funbag Animation Studios	CBS	seasons 1–2 only
Jake and the Kid		1995–1997	Great North Productions	Global	
Little Bear	Little Bear by Else Holmelund Minarik and Maurice Sendak	1995–2001	John B. Carls Productions Inc. (seasons 2–5); Wild Things Productions (seasons 2–5); Hong Guang Animation (Suzhou) (season 5)	CBC Television (Canada); Nickelodeon (United States)	
Tales from the Crypt	William Gaines; Steven Dodd	1996	Tales from the Crypt Holdings; Geffen Television	HBO	animation for "The Third Pig"
Robin	Magnus Carlsson	1996	Happy Life; TMO Film GmbH	SVT1	
Gargoyles: The Goliath Chronicles	Greg Weisman	1996–1997	Walt Disney Television Animation; Buena Vista Television	ABC	animation production
Waynehead	Damon Wayans	1996–1997	Warner Bros. Television Animation	YTV (Canada); Kids' WB (United States)	
Blazing Dragons	Terry Jones; Gavin Scott (d): Peter Sauder; Erika Strobel	1996–1998	Ellipse Programme; Carlton Television	Teletoon (Canada); Canal+ (France); CITV (United Kingdom); Toon Disney (United States)	
Stickin' Around	Robin Steele; Brianne Leary	1996–1998		YTV (Canada); Fox Kids (United States)	
The Adventures of Sam & Max: Freelance Police	Steve Purcell	1997–1998		YTV (Canada); Fox Kids (United States)	
Pippi Longstocking	Paul Riley	1997	AB Svensk Filmindustri; TaurusFilm; TFC Trickompany Filmproduktion	Teletoon (Canada); ZDF (Germany); SVT1 (Sweden); HBO (United States)	
Ned's Newt	Andy Knight; Mike Burgess (d): Andrew Nicholls; Darrell Vickers	1997–2000	TMO-Loonland Film GmbH; Studio B Productions (season 2)	Teletoon (Canada); Fox Kids (United States)	
Donkey Kong Country	Donkey Kong by Nintendo; Donkey Kong Country by Nintendo and Rare (d): Jacques Goldstein; Philippe Percebois	1997–2000	Medialab Studio L.A. (season 1); Hong Guang Animation (season 2); WIC Entertainment; Nintendo	Teletoon (Canada); France 2/Canal+ (France); Fox Kids (United States)	
Franklin	Franklin the Turtle by Paulette Bourgeois; Brenda Clark	1997–2004	Big Bang Digital Studios; Neuroplanet (Note: Known as Neurones for seasons 1-4) (seasons 1-5); LuxAnimation (season 6); Alphanim (season 6)	CBC Television (season 1) / Family Channel (seasons 1–5) / Treehouse TV (season 6; Canada); TF1 (France); Nickelodeon / Nick Jr. (United States)	
Rolie Polie Olie	William Joyce	1998–2004	Métal Hurlant Productions (seasons 1–5); Sparx* (seasons 1–5); Sparkling Animation (season 6)	CBC Television (Canada); La Cinquième/France 5 (France); Disney Channel (United States)	
Birdz	Larry Jacobs	1998–1999		CBS	
Dumb Bunnies	Dav Pilkey (d): Dale Schott	1998–1999	Yoram Gross-Village Roadshow; Hong Guang Animation (Suzhou); Scottish Television Enterprises; Scholastic Inc.	CBS	
Anatole		1998–2000	Valentine Productions s.a.r.l. Scottish Television Enterprises	CBS	
Mythic Warriors: Guardians of the Legend	Myth Men Guardians of the Legend by: Laura Geringer; Peter Bollinger	1998–2000	Marathon Productions; Hong Guang Animation (Suzhou); Scholastic Inc. Scottish Television Enterprises (season 1); CBS Television (season 1)	CBS	
Flying Rhino Junior High	Ray Nelson, Jr.	1998–2000	Big Daddy Productions; Flying Rhinoceros, Inc. Neurones Animation; Scottish Television Enterprises; CBS Productions	Teletoon (Canada); TF1 (France); CITV/Scottish Television (United Kingdom); CBS (United States)	
Bob and Margaret	David Fine; Alison Snowden	1998–2001	Snowden Fine Animation; SilverLine Productions (season 2); Philippine Animation Studio Inc. (seasons 3–4); National Film Board of Canada	Global (Canada); Channel 4 (United Kingdom); Comedy Central (United States)	
Elliot Moose	Elliot Moose by Andrea Beck (d): Jed MacKay	1999–2000		TVOntario	
George and Martha	James Marshall	1999–2000	Wild Things Productions	YTV (Canada); HBO Family (United States)	
Blaster's Universe	Blaster Learning System by Knowledge Adventure (d): Jamie Tatham; Dale Schott	1999–2000	Hong Guang Animation; CBS Productions; Knowledge Adventure	Teletoon (Canada); CBS (United States)	
Redwall	Brian Jacques (d): Steve Roberts	1999–2001	Molitor Productions; United Productions (season 1); Alphanim (season 1); TV-Loonland AG (seasons 2–3)	Teletoon (Canada); France 2/France 3 (France); Ki.KA (Germany); PBS (United States)	
Rescue Heroes	Fisher-Price	1999–2002	Hong Guang Animation (Suzhou) (season 1)	Teletoon (Canada); CBS (United States)	
2000s
Cardcaptors	Clamp	2000–2017	Madhouse; Nippon Animedia	Teletoon (Canada); Kids' WB (United States)	English dub
Maggie and the Ferocious Beast	Michael Paraskevas; Betty Paraskevas (d): Betty Quan	2000–2002		Teletoon (Canada); Nick Jr. (United States)	
Bookworm Bunch
Corduroy	Betty Quan	2000–2001	Sichuan Top Animation	PBS Kids	
Timothy Goes to School	Rosemary Wells	2000–2001	Silver Lining Productions; Animation Services Hong Kong Limited	PBS Kids	
Seven Little Monsters	Maurice Sendak	2000–2003	Wild Things Productions; Hong Ying Animation (seasons 1–2); Philippine Animation Studio Inc. (season 3)	PBS Kids	
George Shrinks	William Joyce	2000–2004	Jade Animation	PBS Kids	
Marvin the Tap-Dancing Horse	Michael Paraskevas; Betty Paraskevas	2000–2002	Hong Guang Animation (Suzhou)	PBS Kids	
John Callahan's Pelswick	John Callahan (d): Andrew Nicholls; Darrell Vickers	2000–2002	Suzhou Hong Ying Animation Corporation Limited; Nickelodeon Productions	CBC (Canada); CCTV (China); Nickelodeon (United States)	
Taina	Maria Perez-Brown	2001–2002	Dorado Productions; Nickelodeon Productions	Nickelodeon	international distribution
The Fairly OddParents	Butch Hartman	2001–2005	Frederator Incorporated; Nickelodeon Animation Studio	Nickelodeon	international distribution; seasons 1–5 only
John Callahan's Quads!	John Callahan (d): Andrew Nicholls; Darrell Vickers	2001–2003	SBS independent Animation Works; Media World Features; Film Victoria; ScreenWest; Lotteries Commission of Western Australia	SBS (Australia); Teletoon at Night (Canada)	
The Sausage Factory	Henry Pincus	2001–2002	Peace Arch Entertainment; MTV Original Productions	The Comedy Network (Canada); MTV (United States)	
Pecola	Naomi Iwata	2001–2002	Yomiko Advertising; Milky Cartoon	Teletoon (Canada); TV Tokyo (Japan); Cartoon Network (United States)	
Braceface	Melissa Clark	2001–2004	Jade Animation	Teletoon (Canada); Fox Family (2001–2002; United States)	
Committed	Michael Fry (d): Howard Nemetz	2001–2002	Philippine Animation Studio Inc.	CTV	
Medabots		2001–2004	Bee Train Production	YTV (Canada); Fox Kids (2001–2002) / ABC Family (2002–2004; United States)	
Cyberchase	Sandra Sheppard	2002–2006	WNET New York; Flying Minds Entertainment (season 4)	PBS Kids	seasons 1–5 only
Beyblade; Beyblade V-Force; Beyblade G-Revolution		2002–2005	Madhouse; Nippon Animedia	YTV (Canada); ABC Family (United States)	
Beware of Dog	Rob Gilmer	2002	Alexander/Enright and Associates	Animal Planet	
Moville Mysteries	Guy Vasilovich	2002–2003	Suzhou Hong Ying Animation Corporation Limited	YTV	
Max & Ruby	Rosemary Wells	2002–2020	Silver Lining Productions (seasons 1–5); 9 Story Entertainment (seasons 3–5); Chorion (seasons 4–5); Atomic Cartoons (seasons 6–7)	Treehouse TV (Canada); Nick Jr. (United States)	
Clone High	Phil Lord; Christopher Miller; Bill Lawrence	2002–2003	Doozer; Lord Miller Productions; Touchstone Television	Teletoon at Night (Canada); MTV (United States)	season 1 only
The Berenstain Bears	Stan & Jan Berenstain	2002–2003	Agogo Entertainment	Treehouse TV (Canada); PBS Kids (United States)	
My Dad the Rock Star	Gene Simmons	2003–2004	Carrere Group	Teletoon (Canada); Nickelodeon (United States)	
Jacob Two-Two		2003–2006	9 Story Entertainment (season 5)	YTV (Canada); Qubo (United States)	
Pandalian		2004–2005	Studio Kuma; Planet Entertainment	YTV (Canada); Funimation Channel (United States)	
6teen	Jennifer Pertsch; Tom McGillis	2004–2010	Fresh TV (seasons 3–4)	Teletoon (Canada); Nickelodeon/Cartoon Network (United States)	
Delta State		2004	Alphanim; Deltanim Productions Inc. DQ Entertainment; LuxAnimation; Cofimage 13	Teletoon (Canada); France 2/Canal+ (France)	
Miss Spider's Sunny Patch Friends	David Kirk; Nadine van der Velde	2004–2009	Callaway Arts & Entertainment; AbsoluteDigital Pictures	Teletoon/Treehouse TV (Canada); Nickelodeon (United States)	
The Backyardigans	Janice Burgess	2004–2013	Nickelodeon Animation Studio	Treehouse TV (Canada); Nickelodeon (United States)	
Being Ian	Ian James Corlett	2005–2008	Studio B Productions	YTV (Canada); Qubo (United States)	
Funpak		2005		YTV (Canada); Qubo (United States)	
Jane and the Dragon	Martin Baynton	2005–2006	Weta Productions	YTV (Canada); Qubo (United States)	
Class of the Titans	Chris Bartleman; Michael Lahay	2005–2008	Studio B Productions	Teletoon (Canada); Qubo (United States)	
Di-Gata Defenders	Greg Collinson	2006–2008	LuxAnimation	Teletoon (Canada); 4Kids TV (United States)	
Grossology	Grossology by Sylvia Branzei (d): Simon Racioppa; Richard Elliott	2006–2009	Flypaper Press	YTV (Canada); Discovery Kids (season 1); Qubo (season 2; United States)	
Ruby Gloom	Martin Hsu (d): Carolyn Hay	2006–2008		YTV (Canada); Qubo (United States)	
Z-Squad	Jin Choi	2006–2007	Enemes	SBS (South Korea); Pop Girl (United Kingdom); KidsCo (internationally); Direct-to-video	
Handy Manny	Roger Bollen; Marilyn Sadler (d): Rick Gitelson	2006–2013		Playhouse Disney (seasons 1–3) / Disney Junior (season 3)	
Horrid Henry	Francesca Simon	2006–2007	Novel Entertainment	CITV	distributor; series 1 only
The Future Is Wild	Joanna Adams (d): Steve Sullivan	2007–2008	IVL Animation	Teletoon (Canada); Discovery Kids (United States)	
My Friend Rabbit		2007–2008		Treehouse TV (Canada); Qubo (United States)	
Wayside	John Derevlany	2007–2008		Teletoon (Canada); Nickelodeon (United States)	
Bakugan Battle Brawlers; Bakugan Battle Brawlers: New Vestroia; Bakugan: Gundalian Invaders; Bakugan: Mechtanium Surge		2008–2012	Sega Toys; Spin Master; TMS Entertainment; Japan Vistec (season 1); Sega Corporation	Teletoon (Canada); Cartoon Network (United States)	
Guess with Jess	Ivor Wood	2008–2010	Classic Media	Treehouse TV (Canada); PBS Kids Sprout/Qubo (United States)	
Willa's Wild Life	Dan Yaccarino	2008–2009	Futurikon; Googly Digital Media	YTV (Canada); TF1/Piwi (France); Qubo (United States)	
Hot Wheels Battle Force 5		2009–2011	Nerd Corps Entertainment; Mattel	Teletoon (Canada); Cartoon Network (United States)	
Pearlie	Wendy Harmer	2009–2010	Sticky Pictures	Network Ten (Australia); YTV (Canada); Qubo (United States)	
Spliced	Simon Racioppa; Richard Elliott	2009–2010		Teletoon (Canada); Jetix (Latin America); Qubo (United States)	
2010s
Beyblade: Metal Fusion; Beyblade: Metal Masters; Beyblade: Metal Fury; Beyblade: Shogun Steel		2010–2014	Tatsunoko Production (season 1); SynergySP (seasons 2–4)	YTV (Canada); Cartoon Network (United States)	
Babar and the Adventures of Badou	Michael Stokes	2010–2015	TeamTO; Guru Studio (season 1); Pipeline Studios (season 1); LuxAnimation (seasons 1–2)	YTV (Canada); TF1/Disney Junior (France); Disney Junior (United States)	
The Adventures of Chuck and Friends	Adam Beechen	2010–2012	Hasbro Studios	The Hub	
Sidekick	Todd Kauffman; Joey So	2010–2013		YTV (Canada); Cartoon Network/Qubo (United States)	
Mr. Young	Dan Signer	2010–2013	Thunderbird Films; Gravy Boat Productions	YTV	
Life with Boys	Michael Poryes	2011–2013	Helion Pictures	YTV (Canada); TeenNick (United States)	
Scaredy Squirrel	Scaredy Squirrel by Mélanie Watt (d): Matt Ferguson; Jillian Ruby	2011–2013		YTV (Canada); Cartoon Network/Qubo (United States)	
Mike the Knight	Alexander Bar	2011–2017	HIT Entertainment	Treehouse TV (Canada); CBeebies (United Kingdom); Nick Jr. (United States)	
Bubble Guppies	Jonny Belt; Robert Scull (d): Janice Burgess	2011–2016	Nickelodeon Animation Studio	Nickelodeon	seasons 2–4 only
Franklin and Friends	Franklin the Turtle series by Paulette Bourgeois and Brenda Clark (d): Jeff Sweeney	2011–2013	Infinite Frameworks	Treehouse TV (Canada); Nickelodeon/Nick Jr. (United States)	
Detentionaire	Daniel Bryan Franklin; Charles Johnston	2011–2015		Teletoon	
BeyWheelz	Katsumi Hasegawa	2012	SynergySP	YTV (Canada); Cartoon Network (United States)	
Oh No! It's an Alien Invasion	Philippe Ivanusic-Vallée; Peter Ricq	2013–2015		YTV (season 1)/Teletoon (season 2)	
The Day My Butt Went Psycho!	The Day My Bum Went Psycho by Andy Griffiths (d): Mark Steinberg	2013–2015	Scholastic Entertainment; Studio Moshi; Brain Bender Pty Ltd.	Nine Network (Australia); Teletoon (Canada); Qubo/Netflix (United States)	
BeyWarriors: BeyRaiderz	Shinzo Fujita	2014	SynergySP d-rights	YTV (Canada); Cartoon Network (United States)	
BeyWarriors: Cyborg	Katsumi Hasegawa	2014–2015	SynergySP d-rights	Toonami	
Trucktown	Jon Scieszka	2014–2017	Lemon Sky Studios	Treehouse TV	
Little Charmers	Jennifer Dodge; Irene Weibel (d): Carolyn Hay	2015–2017	Spin Master Entertainment; Atomic Cartoons	Treehouse TV (Canada); Nickelodeon/Nick Jr. (United States)	
The Stanley Dynamic	Ken Cuperus (d): Jocelyn Hamilton; Jamie Piekarz	2015–2017	Amaze	YTV	
Fresh Beat Band of Spies	Nadine Van der Velde; Scott Kraft (d): Michael Ryan	2015–2016	6point2 Nickelodeon Animation Studio	Nick Jr.	
Ranger Rob	Alexander Bar (d): Andrew Sabiston; Carolyn Hay	2016–2021	Studio Liddell	Treehouse TV/Ici Radio-Canada Télé (Canada); Tiny Pop (United Kingdom); Universal Kids (United States)	
The ZhuZhus	ZhuZhu Pets by Russ Hornsby (d): Hugh Duffy	2016–2017	Cepia LLC; Corus Entertainment	YTV (Canada); Disney Channel (United States)	
Hotel Transylvania: The Series	Hotel Transylvania by; Todd Durham; Sony Pictures Animation; (d): Mark Steinberg	2017–2020	Sony Pictures Animation; Corus Entertainment	Teletoon (Canada); Disney Channel (United States)	
Mysticons	Sean Jara (d): Nelvana Limited; The Topps Company; Michael Eisner (uncredited)	2017–2018	Topps Animation	YTV (Canada); Nickelodeon (season 1); Nicktoons (season 2; United States)	
Wishfart	John Hazlett; Lienne Sawatsky; Daniel Williams	2017–2018	Wishfart Productions Inc.	Teletoon (Canada); CITV (United Kingdom)	
Bravest Warriors	Pendleton Ward (d): Breehn Burns; Will McRobb; Chris Viscardi	2017–2018	Frederator Studios	VRV (United States); Teletoon (Canada)	season 4 only
ReBoot: The Guardian Code	Michael Hefferon; Sean Jara	2018	Mainframe Studios	YTV (Canada); Netflix (United States)	distributor
Esme & Roy	Dustin Ferrer; Amy Steinberg	2018–2021	Sesame Workshop	Treehouse TV (Canada); HBO (season 1) / HBO Max (season 2; United States)	
Go Away, Unicorn!	Emily Mullock (d): Dan Signer	2018–2019	Sonar Entertainment	YTV (Canada); Disney Channel (United States)	
Miss Persona		2018–2021	Balloon House Productions	Treehouse TV	
Bakugan: Battle Planet; Bakugan: Armored Alliance; Bakugan: Geogan Rising; Bakugan: Evolutions	Spin Master; Sega Fave	2018–2023	TMS Entertainment; Man of Action Studios; Spin Master Entertainment	Teletoon/Cartoon Network (Canada); Cartoon Network (seasons 1–2) / Netflix (seasons 3–5; United States)	
Super BOOMi	Trevor Lai	2019–present	Up Studios; Tencent	Treehouse TV (Canada); Tencent Video (China)	distributor
Corn & Peg	Chris Hamilton	2019–2020		Treehouse TV (Canada); Nickelodeon (United States)	
Super BOOMi Hockey Hero	Trevor Lai	2019	Up Studios; Tencent; National Hockey League	Tencent Video	distributor
D.N. Ace	Matthew Wexler (d): John Derevlany; Andrew Harrison	2019–2020	Yeti Farm; Wexworks Media	Teletoon	
Agent Binky: Pets of the Universe	The Binky the Space Cat series by Ashley Spires (d): Carolyn Hay; Hugh Duffy	2019–2024	Redknot	Treehouse TV	
The Remarkable Mr. King	Geneviève Côté	2019–2020		Treehouse TV	
2020s
Ollie's Pack	Pedro Eboli; Graham Peterson	2020–2021	Corus Entertainment	YTV (Canada); Nickelodeon (United States)	
The Dog & Pony Show	Josh Selig	2020–2021	Discovery, Inc. Little Airplane Productions; Redknot	Treehouse TV (Canada); Discovery Kids (Latin America)	
The Hardy Boys	Steve Cochrane; Jason Stone	2020–2023	Lambur Productions	YTV (Canada); Hulu (United States)	
Bluey	Joe Brumm	2021–2024	Ludo Studio	ABC Kids	licensing agent; season 3 only
Thomas & Friends: All Engines Go	Britt Allcroft; Rick Suvalle	2021–2025	Mattel Television	Cartoon Network (2021–2023) / Netflix (2024–2025; United States); Treehouse TV (Canada)	
Super Wish	Vanessa Esteves; Adrian Thatcher	2022	Redknot; Discovery, Inc.	YTV (Canada); Discovery Kids (Latin America)	
Best & Bester	Joonas Utti; Anttu Harlin; Kyle Hart	2022–2023	Gigglebug Entertainment; Eye Present	YTV (Canada); Yle TV2 (Finland); Nickelodeon (United Kingdom)	distributor licensing agent
Builder Brothers Dream Factory	Drew and Jonathan Scott	2023	Sinking Ship Entertainment; Scott Brothers Entertainment	Treehouse TV	
Zokie of Planet Ruby	Brian Morante	2023	Atomic Cartoons; Corus Entertainment	YTV (Canada); Nickelodeon (internationally)	
Geek Girl		2024–present	RubyRock Pictures; Aircraft Pictures	Netflix	
Barney's World	Sheryl Leach; Kathy Parker; Dennis DeShazer	2024–2025	Mattel Television	Treehouse TV/StackTV (Canada); Cartoon Network/HBO Max (United States)	
Hamsters of Hamsterdale	Zach Smith	2024–present	Corus Entertainment	Treehouse TV (Canada); Nick Jr. (internationally)	
Mermicorno: Starfall	Simone Legno	2025	Toikido; Atomic Cartoons; Thunderbird Entertainment	YTV (Canada); Cartoon Network (Southeast Asia); HBO Max (internationally)	licensing agent
Piñata Smashlings		2025–present	Toikido; Corus Entertainment	YTV	
Millie Magnificent		2026–present	Corus Entertainment	Treehouse TV (Canada); ABC Kids (Australia)	

== Short films ==
- Queen Street West (1973)
- Apple Cider Time (1975)
- Maple Spring (1977)
- Nishnawbe-Aski: The People and the Land (1977) (animation)
- Shoppin' for Clothes (1988)
- Journey to the Planets (1993) (animated sequences)
- Stickin' Around (1994) (CBS interstitial series)
- The Larry Lard Show (1996) (pilot)
- Mr. Lucky (1996) (post-production)
- Jean-Luc & Dondoozat (1998) (short series; with Bibo Films, Canal+ and Télétoon)
- The Most Magnificent Thing (2019)
- Toon Bops (2019–present) (short series)
- Jelly (2023)

== Commercials ==
- 7 Up (early 1990s)
- Bauer Athletic Footwear (1982)
- Cadbury's Dairy Milk (1982)
- Cap'n Crunch/Blockbuster Video (1994)
- CBC Radio (two spots)
- Chef Boyardee (early 1990s)
- CIBC (mid 1990s)
- Cow Brand
- Dellcrest Children's Center (1979) (live-action PSA)
- Garfield Ravioli (1994)
- Green Park (early 1990s)
- The Guardian
- Heinz Scarios (1980, 1982)
- Honeycomb (early 1990s)
- IBM (1993)
- Imperial Oil (1978)
- M&M's (early 1990s)
- Ocean Spray (1990s)
- Ontario Dental Association (four spots; 1994)
- Ontario Hydro (1979, 1981)
- Philishave Lift and Cut
- Planters (1981, early 1990s)
- Purina Butcher's Blend (1981, 1983)
- Purina Puppy Chow (1980)
- Raid (1982)
- RE/MAX
- Rice Krispies (early 1990s, 1994)
- Shreddies (1989, 1992)
- Stay Alert Stay Safe (1990)
- Tetley Tea (early 1980s)
- Toronto City Cycling Committee (1989)
- Toronto Star (early 1980s)
- WHSmith
- White Swan (1991)
