= Franklin's Magic Christmas =

2001 film by John van Bruggen

- Directed by: John van Bruggen
- Written by: Betty Quan
- Based on: Franklin and Harriet by Paulette Bourgeois; Brenda Clark
- Starring: Noah Reid; Elizabeth Saunders; Richard Newman; Bryn McAuley; Luca Perlman; Kristen Bone; Mari Trainor; Donald Burda; Joyce Gordon; Eric Peterson; Araby Lockhart; Chris Wiggins
- Production company: Nelvana
- Distributed by: Kaboom! Entertainment; Universal Pictures Home Entertainment
- Release date: November 6, 2001
- Running time: 55 minutes
- Country: Canada
- Language: English

Franklin's Magic Christmas is a 2001 Canadian direct-to-video animated Christmas film written by Betty Quan and directed by John van Bruggen. The film's runtime of 55 minutes is somewhat shorter than Franklin and the Green Knight. The second Franklin film, it was released on November 6, 2001, has since aired on the Nick Jr. Channel in the United States and on Canada's Family Channel, and has also been available on Comcast Video on Demand. The film is loosely based on the book Franklin and Harriet.

== Plot ==
Franklin the Turtle, his little sister, Harriet (introduced in the previous film, Franklin and the Green Knight), and their parents, Mr. and Mrs. Turtle, plan to spend Christmas with their maternal grandparents (Mrs. Turtle's parents) at Faraway Farm, a farm far away from Woodland where Mrs. Turtle grew up. As the family gets ready to leave, they sing the first and third verses of Deck the Halls. Franklin immediately becomes annoyed with Harriet when she throws a snowball at him, causing him to drop a large pile of presents. Franklin's best friend Bear and his little sister Beatrice come to collect Franklin's pet goldfish, Goldie, and Franklin accidentally leaves his favorite stuffed toy dog Sam behind. Franklin thinks that Harriet dumped Sam in the snow on purpose, when in reality Beatrice had found Sam and Bear had failed to give it back to Franklin before they left. Franklin is still annoyed with Harriet when they get to Faraway Farm, and he becomes even more annoyed when he learns that he and Harriet will be sleeping in the same room. Later that evening, his grandmother, Jenny, tells a strange story from her childhood about a reindeer. This story involves a flashback showing young Jenny and her father (Mrs. Turtle's grandfather and Franklin and Harriet's great-grandfather). Jenny admits that she might have imagined things just as Mr. Turtle takes a family portrait, in which Franklin gives a sad look because he still misses Sam. Jenny then shows Franklin Sirius outside, and then sings Twinkle Twinkle Little Star to him to help him sleep.

The next day, as Franklin feeds the chickens, Jenny lets him in on a little surprise; she is fixing up an old sleigh for Grandfather Turtle. Franklin decides to help, and Jenny introduces him to her neighbors, the Collies, who collect the polish for the sleigh. That night, an ice storm strikes, causing a blackout, and while Franklin is checking the attic closet for candles, he comes across the bell from Jenny's story, revealing that she was not imagining the story after all.

Franklin shows the bell to Jenny the next morning (Christmas Eve), and suggests that they use the bell for his grandfather's sleigh. Jenny has Harriet help with the sleigh, but Harriet spills the beans at lunch, much to Franklin's frustration, although fortunately, his grandfather does not overhear. Later, Mr. and Mrs. Turtle go to check on the Collies while Franklin and Harriet continue to work on the sleigh. Despite Franklin telling her not to do so, Harriet rings the bell, and just like in Jenny's story, a reindeer appears. Franklin runs to the house to tell Jenny. In the process, Franklin distracts Grandfather Turtle, who slips on a puddle of ice and breaks his leg. Back in the house, Jenny examines him and tells him to rest. Grandfather Turtle comforts Harriet when she cries and when Franklin says that he feels guilty, Grandfather Turtle tells him it was simply an accident. Jenny sends Franklin and Harriet to their room while she cares for Grandfather Turtle.

Franklin decides to use the sleigh to go back to Woodland and find Bear and Beatrice's mother, Dr. Bear. He eventually discovers that Harriet has come along, hidden in the back. Rosie the horse, who is pulling the sleigh, is just as surprised as Franklin, and runs away, leaving the two young turtles stranded and lost in the woods. Back at the farm, Jenny finds a note that Franklin wrote saying that he is going back to Woodland to find Dr. Bear. Mr. and Mrs. Turtle soon return home from the Collies'; they discover what has happened and they and the grandparents become worried about Franklin and Harriet. Meanwhile, Franklin angrily gives his little sister an angry earful for her disobedience, which causes her to start crying. Franklin then comforts her & he apologises to her for yelling at her. Harriet then reveals that she has the bell. With Franklin's approval, she rings it, and this time two reindeer come. One of them has the same exact bell as the one Franklin and Harriet have. Franklin realizes that the bell must belong to the other reindeer and that this is why he always comes whenever somebody rings it. With the bell back, the original reindeer creates a harness seemingly out of nowhere. With the help of the two reindeer, Franklin and Harriett soon arrive at the Bears' house and fetch Dr. Bear. Back at the farm, Jenny and Mr. and Mrs. Turtle decide to split up and try to find the children. Rosie returns to the farm and they all see Franklin, Harriet, and Dr. Bear arrive by sleigh. Dr. Bear gives Grandfather Turtle a cast for his leg and also returns Sam to Franklin, much to his delight.

That night, Franklin and Harriet see Santa Claus and the reindeer out the window. The film ends with Franklin and Harriet wishing each other a Merry Christmas.

== Voice actors ==
- Noah Reid as Franklin Turtle
- Bryn McAuley as Harriet
- Richard Newman as Mr. Turtle
- Elizabeth Saunders as Mrs. Turtle
- Joyce Gordon as Grandmother Turtle
- Eric Peterson as Grandfather Turtle
- Kristen Bone as Jenny
- Richard Newman as Jenny's father
- Luca Perlman as Bear
- Kristen Bone as Beatrice
- Mari Trainor as Dr. Bear
- Donald Burda as Mr. Bear
- Chris Wiggins as Mr. Collie
- Araby Lockhart as Mrs. Collie

== See also ==
- List of Christmas films
