= Franklin and the Turtle Lake Treasure =

- French theatrical release poster
- Directed by: Dominique Monféry
- Written by: John van Bruggen
- Based on: Franklin the Turtle by Paulette Bourgeois; Brenda Clark
- Produced by: Cynthia Taylor
- Starring: Louise Cheka; Ariane Aggiage; Ivanah Coppola; Isabelle Volpe; Doug Murray; Kevin Sommier
- Edited by: Patrick Gonidec
- Music by: Ray Parker; Tom Szczesniak
- Production companies: Alphanim; Nelvana Limited; StudioCanal; Europool
- Distributed by: Mars Distribution
- Release dates: September 6, 2006 (Canada); December 20, 2006 (France)
- Running time: 85 minutes
- Countries: Canada; France
- Language: English
- Box office: $4.1 million

Franklin and the Turtle Lake Treasure (Franklin et le trésor du lac in France and Benjamin et le Trésor du lac in Canadian French) is a children's animated adventure drama film based on the TV series Franklin. The first Franklin film shown in theaters in Canada and France, it was the last production in the Franklin series to be traditionally animated. The film was written by John van Bruggen and directed by Dominique Monféry. According to van Bruggen, the film takes Franklin on "a much greater adventure than any of the past Franklin films, including Franklin and the Green Knight." The film's runtime stands at 85 minutes, making it the longest film of the series. The film served as the series finale to the television series, since no new episodes were produced after its release.

The film centers around Franklin's granny falling ill during a visit from Franklin's Aunt Lucy, an archaeologist. Aunt Lucy knows about a special talisman that may cure the illness and joins Franklin on a quest to find it, with his friends Bear, Beaver and Snail. They are also accompanied by Aunt Lucy's goddaughter, Samantha (Sam), whose personality clashes with Franklin's.

The film was released direct-to-video on September 6, 2006. It was distributed by Mars Distribution and Universal Pictures while StudioCanal handled international sales. The working titles for the film were Franklin and the Secret Talisman and Franklin and Granny's Secret.

The film was Patricia Gage's final performance before her death in 2010.

== Plot ==
The Turtle family gathers at Franklin's grandmother's house to celebrate the visit of Franklin's paternal aunt, archaeologist Lucy, who brings her goddaughter, Samantha (Sam) along. Franklin and Sam find it difficult to get along due to Sam's mischievous nature and her boastfulness about being a year older than Franklin.

Franklin finds a hand-drawn map of Turtle Lake among Lucy's old belongings, and recognizes that it was made by his grandmother. At Franklin and Sam's urging, Granny tells them that as a child, she lived at Turtle Lake with her parents. One day, she found a secret place and buried her valuables inside a painted tin box, then drew a map to it, but never got the chance to open it again. A few days later, while she camped at the lake, a forest fire began that destroyed their house and killed her parents. She went to live with her aunt's family and has not been back to Turtle Lake since.

Overwhelmed by the painful memories, Granny is taking ill and the Turtles check on her. When she mentions her buried box, Franklin thinks it may be their only hope to cure her. With Lucy's guide, Franklin and Sam, along with Franklin's friends, Bear, Beaver, and Snail travel to Turtle Lake searching for the box at the ruins of Granny's old home, but they not find it. They soon meet a local turtle woman who shows them a turtle talisman, a similar that Granny had in her box. She explains that the talismans has strong psychic power, which Franklin assumes is the real reason why Granny wanted them to find her box.

The next day, they meet Little Crow, an orphan bird, who shows them the box's location, but they find that someone has already dug it up. Little Crow later kidnaps Snail and takes her to his falcon chick friends so they can play with her. Franklin and Sam volunteer to rescue Snail, but their personalites clashes again. After they figuring out how to work together, admitting that their differences has gotten the best of them, they reach the top of the mountain where the falcon nest lies. The Falcon Mama, having discovered her chicks' antics, lets Snail go with Franklin and Sam, and decides to adopt Little Crow into their family after being convinced of his good intentions. This also restores the group's faith in their mission, so they continue searching for the box.

Following the advice the old turtle woman gave them that "the treasure is under the rainbow", they reach a mountain pass and wait for the rain. They find a cave, where they meet a grizzly bear named Grizzly. He reveals that he found the box long ago with a metal detector and added to his collection of found items, but does not remember where he put it. Eventually, they find the box under a crystal chandelier that divides the sunlight into a rainbow. Grizzly then helps them travel across the river with his canoe and the group heads home.

Returning home, they give the turtle talisman to Granny, but it does not effect her. However, when they show her other contents of the box, including a picture of her and her parents, she slowly starts to recover, stating that she finally got back the only memento she had left from her parents. The Turtle family happily celebrates her recovery.

Later that evening, Lucy announces she will be staying in Woodland for some time to be with her family, while Franklin and Sam say goodbye and hope to meet again someday. Franklin gives Sam the Turtle Lake map so she can always remember their adventure, and Sam kisses Franklin in return.

== Cast ==
- Cameron Ansell as Franklin
- Marc McMulkin as Bear
- Leah Cudmore as Beaver
- Tajja Isen as Samantha. Isen also voices a younger version of Granny Turtle in the flashback scenes.
- Kristen Bone as Snail
- Doug Murray as Grizzly
- Corinne Conley as Granny Turtle
- Shauna Black as Aunt Lucy
- Hannah Endicott-Douglas as Little Crow
- Elizabeth Saunders as Mrs. Turtle
- Richard Newman as Mr. Turtle
- Bryn McAuley as Harriet
- Patricia Gage as the Old Turtle
- Mari Trainor as Dr. Bear
- Helen Taylor as Mrs. Falcon
- Isaac Pustil, Emma Pustil, and Joshua Isen as the Baby Chicks

== Versions ==
Franklin and the Turtle Lake Treasure is available in French and English versions, which have different case covers. The film's French title is Franklin et le trésor du lac, and it was released in Canadian and French theaters in 2006. On May 22, 2007, HBO Video released the film on DVD in the United States. It received a G rating from the MPAA although it was not theatrically released in the US.

== Reception ==
Anna Hart of the Empire called it an "Unecessary spin-off of a fairly lame children's animation."

The film grossed $4.1 million in the territories where it was released theatrically.
