= Back to School with Franklin =

- Screenshot from the film
- Directed by: Arna Selznick
- Written by: John van Bruggen
- Based on: Franklin the Turtle by Paulette Bourgeois; Brenda Clark
- Produced by: Yvette Kaplan
- Starring: Cole Caplan; Bryn McAuley; Kristen Bone; Carolyn Scott; James Rankin; Leah Cudmore; Annick Obonsawin; Valerie Boyle; Elizabeth Saunders (as Elizabeth Brown); Scott Beaudin; Amanda Soha; Vivien Endicott-Douglas; Luca Perlman; Richard Newman; Ruby Smith-Merowitz
- Production company: Nelvana
- Distributed by: Kaboom! Entertainment; Universal Pictures Home Entertainment
- Release date: August 19, 2003
- Running time: 46 minutes
- Country: Canada
- Language: English

Back to School with Franklin is a 2003 Canadian animated comedy film directed by Arna Selznick. The film, as the third Franklin film, was released direct-to-video on August 19, 2003 and was later released on DVD. The film is 46 minutes long, making it the shortest Franklin film.

Cole Caplan takes over for Noah Reid as the voice of Franklin the Turtle, ushering in the sixth season of the program, which would not make its way to the United States until September 5, 2004 on Noggin. He is joined by Bryn McAuley, who has voiced his sister Harriet since the first film and Carolyn Scott as the voice of a replacement teacher Miss Koala.

== Plot ==
The main plot focuses around Franklin Turtle and his friends starting a new year of school after a fun and relaxing summer, only to find out that their teacher Mr. Owl is absent because he got called away on a family matter the night before. Their replacement teacher, Ms. Koala from Australia, pulls up on a motorbike and at first Franklin finds her weird. She uses phrases such as "fair dinkum" and wants to create a brand-new soccer team. Soon, however, he and everyone else in the class are won over by her "can-do" attitude and by the time Mr. Owl returns, Ms. Koala leaves; but not before the class draws her a final farewell picture on the blackboard.

Meanwhile, Franklin's younger sister, Harriet is upset because her best friend (Franklin's best friend Bear's younger sister) Beatrice has gone to preschool, meaning that she cannot play with her most of the time on weekdays. Her spirits are raised when she meets Beaver's younger brother Kit (Amanda Soha), but Kit is a bit reclusive and may not be ready to play with her, especially after an incident on the playground slide that results in them both getting hurt.

Franklin excited to be back to school does not realize the number of changes that he would have to experience on his first day of the school year. Franklin and his class overcome their fears of change and eventually accept the fact that they were going to have an interim teacher.

Franklin's sister Harriet is going through an emotional time knowing that her friend was starting school meaning she will not be able to play with her during the day anymore. Harriet is introduced to Beaver's little brother Kit. Their personalities do not match at first, nevertheless becoming friends.

Franklin hands over his favorite blue blanket to his little sister, to help keep her calm. She later copies the actions of her brother handing them to her new friend Kit during his troubles.

== Voice Cast ==
Cole Caplan	Franklin Turtle
Richard Newman	Mr. Turtle
Elizabeth Saunders	Mrs. Turtle
Bryn McAuley	Harriet Turtle
Amanda Soha	Kit
Carolyn Scott	Miss Koala
James Rankin	Mr. Owl
Leah Renee Cudmore	Beaver
Valerie Boyle	Mrs. Beaver
Kristen Bone	Snail
Vivien Endicott Douglas	Goose
Luca Perlman	Bear
Ruby Smith-Merovitz	Badger
Scott Beaudin	Fox
Annick Obonsawin	Skunk

== Songs ==
- Doin' Nuthin (Can Be a Busy Thing)! - written by Norm Hacking; performed by Emilie-Claire Barlow, Demetrious Matthews (as Dimitrius Matthews) and Brittany Kay.
