= Franklin and Friends =

CGI children's television series (2011–2013)

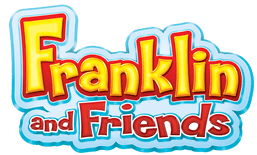
- Also known as: Franklin and Friends: Into the Woods
- Genre: Animation; Children's television series; Fantasy
- Based on: Franklin the Turtle series by Paulette Bourgeois and Brenda Clark
- Developed by: Jeff Sweeney
- Voices of: Graeme Jokic; Elizabeth Saunders (as Elizabeth Brown); Richard Newman; Camden Angelis; John Stocker
- Theme music composer: Bruce Cockburn
- Opening theme: "Franklin and Friends" performed by Bruce Cockburn
- Ending theme: "Franklin and Friends" (instrumental)
- Composer: John Welsman
- Countries of origin: Canada; Singapore
- No. of seasons: 2
- No. of episodes: 52

Production
- Running time: 23 minutes
- Production companies: Infinite Frameworks; Nelvana

Original release
- Network: Treehouse TV (Canada); Mediacorp (Singapore)
- Release: March 4, 2011 – December 22, 2013

Franklin and Friends is a CGI animated children's television series produced by Nelvana. The second adaptation and spin-off of the classic characters from the Franklin the Turtle series of children's books written by Paulette Bourgeois and illustrated by Brenda Clark (the first being Franklin, which was also co-produced by Nelvana Limited, the series was announced by Nelvana Limited on September 28, 2010). The series also serves as a reboot of the 1997 animated television series. The series premiered on Treehouse TV on March 4, 2011. The series’ theme song, "Franklin and Friends", is a revamped version of the original series theme ("Hey It's Franklin").

After 2 years of airing, the final episode of the series aired on December 22, 2013. 52 episodes were produced in total.

== Broadcast and release ==
The series debuted on Treehouse TV on March 4, 2011. It premiered in the United States on Nickelodeon on February 13, 2012. It later began airing on the Nick Jr. Channel from March 1, 2012, to March 29, 2019. The series ended on December 22, 2013. Starting on June 18, 2022, it aired as part of Univision's Planeta U block. On March 9, 2024, all 52 episodes were uploaded to YouTube by the official Franklin YouTube channel.

== Episodes ==
=== Season 1 (2011–2012) ===
No. overall	No. in season	Title	Original release date
1	1	"Franklin and the Gecko Games / Franklin's All Ears"	March 4, 2011
Franklin and Beaver compete to be Gordon the Gecko's sitter, putting their friendship to the test!; Franklin and Snail do some snooping into their friends' suspicious behaviour.
2	2	"Franklin and the Snow Princess / Franklin and the Firefly Festival"	March 5, 2011
When Beaver suffers an accident, Franklin leads his friends in creating a skating throne that allows Beaver to go on.; Bear doesn't think he has a dance for the Firefly Festival.
3	3	"Franklin's Special Job / Franklin Needs a Reminder"	March 11, 2011
Franklin looks for a job but discovers that making Harriet feel important is the most special job of all.; Franklin learns not to take advantage of his friendship with Bear to get out of trouble!
4	4	"Franklin Helps Out / Franklin's Partner"	March 18, 2011
Keeping promises is important. Franklin fulfils a promise to help Aunt T with her chores & has unexpected fun.; Good partners make decisions together. Franklin & Bear combine their ideas to make a bumpy buggy.
5	5	"Franklin and the Pinecone Pass / Franklin and the Creepy Clock"	March 25, 2011
When Bear enjoys playing Rabbit's new game, Franklin fears that Bear has found a new best friend!; After Harriet hears a scary story, Franklin must help her get over her fear.
6	6	"Franklin and the Mystery of the Berry Bogie / Franklin Sees a Storm"	April 1, 2011
Leaders bring people together. Franklin must get the Super Cluepers to work together.; Change can be difficult, but exciting. A storm hits Woodland destroying the tree fort.
7	7	"Franklin and the Mystery of the Blue Begonia / Franklin, the Planner"	April 8, 2011
Mr. Groundhog's Blue Begonia gets mysteriously picked and the Super Cluepers assemble to solve the enigma.; Franklin gets everyone to merge their plans for the new Tree Fort into one grand structure.
8	8	"Franklin's Ups and Downs / Franklin's New Teacher"	April 15, 2011
When Franklin can't master his new Pogo Paws and Bear can't remember the new club.; Franklin is upset when Mr. Owl is to be temporarily replaced.
9	9	"Franklin and Snail Mail / Franklin the Moose-eratops"	April 22, 2011
With the help of Mr. Mole's train set, Franklin helps Snail see the World.; Franklin and Bear take things too far when deciding to be Moose-eratops.
10	10	"Franklin Finds the Treasure / Franklin and the Tunnel Team-Up"	April 29, 2011
Franklin urges Bear and their Dads forward in a search for buried treasure.; Bear and Mr. Owl take on Franklin and Mr. Groundhog in a Bumpy Buggy race.
11	11	"Franklin and the Snow Dragon / Franklin Gets Bugged"	May 6, 2011
Franklin is excited to be spending three days at Bear's house but soon misses his own home.; Franklin brings Fox and Beaver together to make a great bug habitat.
12	12	"Franklin In the Stars / Franklin and Sam"	May 13, 2011
Franklin's plan of star gazing with Aunt T's telescope is ruined by clouds.; Franklin has to think of a substitute when Harriet takes a liking to Sam and refuses to give him up.
13	13	"Franklin and the Bumpy Buggy / It's Father's Day, Franklin!"	June 17, 2011
Franklin and Bear create the first Bumpy Buggy.; Franklin is excited at making the perfect Father's Day gift for Mr. Turtle that he spends the day creating one and paying no attention to Dad.
14	14	"Franklin and the Wonder / Franklin, the Little Bubble"	September 16, 2011
You can help others overcome fears with a little creative thinking. Franklin & Aunt T help Rabbit overcome his fear.; It is important to fix your mistakes. Franklin sabotages Aunt T's party.
15	15	"Take Harriet with You / Franklin's New Hat"	September 23, 2011
Franklin and Bear are asked to watch their little brothers and sisters, throwing a wrench into their plans.; Harriet makes Franklin an enormous and awkward Spring Festival hat and Franklin must confess that he wrecked it.
16	16	"Franklin and the Shadow Show / Franklin's Fishing Trip"	September 30, 2011
Mrs. Turtle arrives in Franklin's class to help but must divide her time with everyone & has little left to help Franklin.; Franklin decides to share his fort with Harriet on a family camping trip.
17	17	"Franklin Flies His Kite / Franklin's Flying Lesson"	October 7, 2011
Franklin is disappointed when his kite doesn't compare to his Dad's and decides to try to fly his Dad's kite.; Franklin thinks that Goose should fly and pushes his hesitant friend into trying.
18	18	"Franklin and Harriet's Buggy / Franklin Changes the Rules"	October 14, 2011
Franklin builds Harriet a Bumpy Buggy, but forgets to listen to what she wants.; When Beaver's game of pirate treasure finders has too many rules, Franklin proposes a new game - no rules.
19	19	"The Super Cluepers Big Small Case / Franklin and the Mystery Muddle"	October 21, 2011
The Super Cluepers set out to solve a REALLY big and exciting case.; Franklin sends the Super Cluepers on a practice mission to hone their skills.
20	20	"It's Halloween Franklin! / Franklin the Adventurer"	October 28, 2011
Franklin and Beaver help each other conquer their fears to navigate Aunt T's spooktacular Halloween Maze.; Bear and Franklin elect to camp out like real adventurers - doing everything by themselves.
21	21	"Franklin and the Super Sleepover / Franklin and the Snoring Situation"	November 4, 2011
The Beaver family arrives for a stay with the Turtles. Franklin feels put out that his routine is being disturbed.; The Submarine Squad game grinds to a halt due to Bear dozing off.
22	22	"Franklin the Engineer / Franklin Needs to Notice"	November 11, 2011
Franklin has to admit he's in over his head and asks Mr. Mole for help when fixing the model train set.; Goose's ballet jump saves the magic show that Franklin and Bear stage for Mother's Day.
23	23	"Franklin's Spaceship / Franklin and the Missing Monarch Mystery"	November 18, 2011
Franklin is so excited about playing Space Ship, he doesn't listen to the Snail.; Franklin & the Super Cluepers find that sitting quietly is a better way to solve the mystery.
24	24	"Franklin the Dinosaur Hunter / Franklin Paints a Picture"	November 25, 2011
Franklin, Bear and Rabbit find a time capsule full of strange artefacts.; In his exuberance, Franklin ruins Beaver's painting.
25	25	"Franklin's Christmas Spirit / Franklin's Campout"	December 20, 2011
When everyone drops out of carolling, Franklin decides to sing anyway.; Mr. Turtle substitutes for Bear on Franklin's Campout, and Franklin has to learn to be flexible in his expectations.
26	26	"Franklin and the Amazing, Stupendous Circus Trick / Franklin's Earth Day"	January 13, 2012
Franklin learns to spin plates from Aunt T and is surprised to learn that the class thinks he can do more.; Franklin's over-zealousness nearly ruins the classes' Earth Day project.

=== Season 2 (2013) ===
No. overall	No. in season	Title	Original release date
27	1	"Franklin and the First Snowfall Festival / Franklin and the Bumpy Fire Buggy"	September 29, 2013
Franklin has trouble when he plays in the winter games, but things improve when he starts believing in himself!; Franklin and friends create a new invention that helps their fire department on a rescue!
28	2	"Franklin and the Adventure on Planet Zorb / Franklin and the Two Unicycles"	September 29, 2013
Franklin's friends want to play different games, but they figure out a way to join Spaceship and Pixies!; Bear and Franklin figure out a unique way to avoid sharing a bicycle ... although maybe sharing is better!
29	3	"Franklin's Firefighter Flapjacks / Franklin and the Missing Mega Machine"	October 5, 2013
When Bear and his Dad don't show up to the firefighter flapjack breakfast, it's up to Franklin to find them.; Submarine Rescue Guys Franklin and Bear lose their new toy, so they dive into their imaginations instead.
30	4	"Franklin's School / Franklin Plays Hoppity Bop"	October 6, 2013
Franklin's playing school, but Harriet and Bee won't pay attention! How can he make the class more exciting?; When Franklin and his friends let Bear win a game of Hoppity Bop, are they really making Bear feel better.
31	5	"Franklin and the Lost Lost Tooth / Franklin and the Karate Klub"	October 12, 2013
Franklin helps Fox find his misplaced baby tooth and learn about how his friends know they're growing up.; Goose and Franklin want to teach themselves tough karate moves, but they don't want to learn the basics first!
32	6	"Franklin and the Woodland Fuzzies / Franklin and Beaver's Show and Sing"	October 13, 2013
Franklin wants his friends to play with the toys he invented, but there's a time and place for everything.; When Beaver loses her voice, she and Franklin come up with a new plan for their Show-and-Tell project!
33	7	"Franklin and the Nature Nuts Hike / Franklin and the Terrible, Terrible Dragon"	October 19, 2013
Franklin hopes to find a rare meteor on his class nature hike, but what else will he find?; Franklin and his friends are taking turns acting out a story, but he doesn't want anyone else playing his part!
34	8	"Franklin and the Drum Circle / Franklin Takes Flight"	October 20, 2013
Everyone has a special beat for the Drum Circle, except Franklin - until he finds his beat was with him all along!; Franklin wants his friends to help him build his plane, but forgets that they may want to fly it too!
35	9	"Franklin Gets a Hole-in-One / Franklin and the Radio"	October 26, 2013
Franklin learns that having a good time is more important than winning when he plays his first game of mini-golf!; Franklin gives his old radio to Fox, but when Fox fixes it up, Franklin suddenly wants it back!
36	10	"Franklin's Big Breakfast / Franklin Switches It Up"	October 27, 2013
It's time for the Turtles' Big Family Breakfast, and "Chef" Franklin tries to make it all by himself!; Franklin and Fox switch roles in the school play and find that trying new things is easier when working together.
37	11	"Franklin and the Sculpture Garden / Franklin and the Silly Stakes"	November 2, 2013
Franklin's giraffe sculpture doesn't turn out just right, but a change of perspective makes a big difference!; Franklin and Bear lose a game and have to stay tied together until dinnertime! Can they become a better team?
38	12	"Franklin the Post Turtle / Franklin's Wild Paper Chase"	November 3, 2013
After going with Mr. Heron to deliver the mail, Franklin sets up his own postal service called Turtle Mail!; Franklin loses Snail's get-well card and must chase it all over town with his friends! Will it ever reach Snail?
39	13	"Super Clueper's Case of the Missing Carrots / Franklin and the Pickle Problem"	November 9, 2013
When all of Rabbit's carrots go missing, it's up to Franklin and the Super Cluepers to solve the case!; Franklin finds himself in a pickle when he tells Beaver he likes pickles, even though he really doesn't!
40	14	"Who's Who in Woodland, Franklin? / Franklin the Inventor"	November 10, 2013
While doing their Who's Who in Woodland project, Franklin and Bear assume they already know all there is to know about Mr. Groundhog.; Franklin and Fox decide they want to be inventors, they find that tinkering and experimenting are just as important to the process as following a plan.
41	15	"Franklin and the Acorn Alley Picnic / The Super Clueper's Case of the Missing Hat"	November 13, 2013
Franklin wants his picnic to be exactly the same as last year's, but sometimes it's better to make new memories.; When Franklin loses his lucky baseball cap, the Super Cluepers make it their mission to find it!
42	16	"Franklin and the No-Sleep Sleepover / Franklin the Farmer"	November 17, 2013
Bear and Franklin stay up late to hear a Submarine Rescue Guys radio show, but can they keep themselves awake?; Franklin and Bear work together to come up with a clever plan to keep crows away from Mr. Groundhog's tomatoes!
43	17	"Coach Franklin / Franklin's Day With Dad"	November 23, 2013
Franklin becomes Bear's personal Stickball coach, but their constant practicing may be a little too intense.; When Franklin's dad gets busy helping others, Franklin learns that a day with Dad is special no matter what.
44	18	"Franklin and the Heat Wave / Franklin's Rocket Team"	November 24, 2013
A heat wave makes it too hot for Franklin's friends to play tag, but a change in the plan may be just what they need!; Franklin wants Rabbit to play Rocket Time with him, but Rabbit keeps playing Tea Time with Harriet instead!
45	19	"Franklin's Dynaroo Day / Franklin and Harriet In Space"	November 30, 2013
Franklin and Beaver pretend to be superheroes, and have a little trouble working together to save the day!; When Franklin's friends are too busy to play, Franklin explores space with Harriet instead!
46	20	"Franklin's Big Box / Franklin Lends a Hand"	December 1, 2013
Franklin thinks Aunt T has forgotten his present when she sends him an empty cardboard box, and learns about imagination; Franklin gets caught up helping people.
47	21	"Franklin Follows the Leader / Franklin's Wilderness Trip"	December 7, 2013
When Goose becomes team leader, Franklin and Beaver learn that listening is just as important as leading.; Franklin and Fox go on a camping trip with their dads and learn some great tips from someone unexpected.
48	22	"Franklin, Back in the Saddle / Franklin's Backwards Day"	December 8, 2013
After falling off his bike, Franklin is scared to get back on. But with some help from friends, he faces his fear.; It's Backwards Day, but Goose isn't enjoying it. Can Franklin help her appreciate the new holiday?
49	23	"Franklin Makes Some Noise / Super Cluepers' Case of the Missing School Bell"	December 14, 2013
After spraining his ankle, Franklin needs help from his friends to adjust to the situation.; When the Super Cluepers have trouble finding objects that have mysteriously vanished, the gang gets creative!
50	24	"Super Clueper's Case of the New Friend / Franklin's Woodland Night"	December 15, 2013
The Super Cluepers are off to find the new Woodland family of skunks and make a new friend!; Franklin and friends are spending the night under the stars! And Skunk, the nighttime expert, is coming along!
51	25	"The Super Cluepers and the Mysterious Mark / Franklin vs The Ninjaroos"	December 21, 2013
The Super Cluepers discover another group of junior detectives.; When Franklin and friends discover the last page of their Dynaroo comic missing, they set out on a search to find it, and the ending they've been so looking forward to reading.
52	26	"Franklin and the Four Seasons"	December 22, 2013
Franklin and his friends have an exciting school project to write the songs about the four seasons. But when every idea Franklin and Snail get for their spring song seems to be already taken by one of the other groups, they struggle with the assignment. It is only through true perseverance do they finally hit upon their very own unique idea, a spring song that celebrates all the seasons!

=== Specials (2014) ===
No.	Title	Original release date
1	"A Franklin and Friends Adventure: Polar Explorer"	June 14, 2014
2	"A Franklin and Friends Adventure: Deep Sea Voyage"	June 14, 2014
