= Franklin (TV series) =

Children's television show

- Based on: Franklin the Turtle by Paulette Bourgeois; Brenda Clark
- Directed by: Arna Selznick; Chad Hicks; Andrew Tan; Gary Hurst (season 6)
- Voices of: Noah Reid; Cole Caplan; Cameron Ansell; Bryn McAuley; Elizabeth Saunders (as Elizabeth Brown); Richard Newman
- Theme music composer: Bruce Cockburn
- Opening theme: "Hey, It's Franklin!" performed by Bruce Cockburn
- Ending theme: "Hey, It's Franklin!" (instrumental)
- Composers: Ray Parker; Thomas Szczesniak
- Countries of origin: Canada; France (Note: Season 3 is the only season not produced in France.)
- Original language: English
- No. of seasons: 6
- No. of episodes: 78 (156 segments) (list of episodes)

Production
- Executive producers: Michael Hirsh (seasons 1–5); Patrick Loubert (seasons 1–5); Clive A. Smith (seasons 1–5); Marc Minjauw (seasons 1–5); Paul Hannequart (seasons 1–5); Paul Robertson (season 6); Scott Dyer (season 6); Doug Murphy (season 6); Emmanuèle Petry (season 6); Christian Davin (season 6); Clément Calvet (season 6)
- Producers: Ruta Cube (seasons 1–2); Ariane Payen (seasons 3–4); Pierre Urbain (seasons 5–6)
- Running time: 23 minutes (11 minutes per segment)
- Production companies: Nelvana Limited; Neuroplanet (seasons 1-5) (Note: Known as Neurones for seasons 1-4); Alphanim (season 6); LuxAnimation (season 6)

Original release
- Network: CBC Television (Canada season 1); Family Channel (Canada seasons 1–5); Treehouse TV (Canada season 6); TF1 (France season 6)
- Release: November 3, 1997 – August 8, 2004

Franklin is a Canadian animated preschool educational children's television series, based on the Franklin the Turtle books by Brenda Clark and Paulette Bourgeois, and co-produced by Nelvana Limited. It was followed up by a CGI adaptation, Franklin and Friends.

The animated series has also produced several book adaptations, and the television films Franklin and the Green Knight (2000), Franklin's Magic Christmas (2001) and Back to School with Franklin (2003), alongside a theatrical movie: Franklin and the Turtle Lake Treasure (2006), all of which were co-produced by Nelvana Limited.

== Premise ==
Franklin follows the eponymous young anthropomorphic turtle who lives in a small village called Woodland with his friends. His television stories and books always begin, "[Franklin] could count by twos and tie his shoes". Episodes of the series follow Franklin's adventures as he goes to school, plays, learns and grows in the world around him, sometimes with the helping hand of an adult such as his parents, Mr. and Mrs. Turtle.

== Episodes ==
Season	Episodes	Originally released	
Season	Episodes	First released	Last released
1	13	November 3, 1997	January 26, 1998
2	13	September 7, 1998	November 30, 1998
3	13	October 11, 1999	February 21, 2000
4	13	May 8, 2000	July 30, 2000
5	13	April 29, 2002	July 22, 2002
6	13	May 22, 2004	August 8, 2004

== Setting and characters ==
=== Characters ===
The main character of the series is Franklin. Almost all events are presented directly from his point of view, with some exceptions. There are no stories in which Franklin is absent, but in some episodes other characters serve as the main focus.

Franklin likes swimming, arts and crafts (especially drawing), and shoofly pie. Franklin has a blue blanket and a blue plush dog with short purple ears named Sam. In earlier seasons, Franklin sleeps with his blanket and Sam. He has been known to be afraid of the dark and thunderstorms. When Franklin is scared by thunderstorms, Sam and his blue blanket help keep him calm because he might otherwise panic or have a meltdown.

Characters who are part of Franklin's family includes his parents Mr. and Mrs. Turtle, and his younger sister Harriet. Mr. and Mrs. Turtle are presented as gentle, loving parents who provide direction and guidance for Franklin and reasonable discipline when needed. His sister, Harriet, was born in the film Franklin and the Green Knight and was featured in stories in the fifth and sixth seasons of the program. Franklin's extended family includes his paternal grandmother, who lives nearby, and his maternal grandparents, who live on a remote farm (as shown in Franklin's Magic Christmas).

In the film Franklin and the Turtle Lake Treasure, Franklin's paternal aunt Lucy and her goddaughter Sam chose to settle in Woodland, as well. Sam has parents but they let her stay in Woodland so she could visit her Godmother, Lucy. In the CGI series, his paternal aunt Teeny ("Aunt T" or "Aunt Turtle") is introduced. In later episodes, Franklin's maternal aunt and uncle and his maternal cousin are introduced.

Franklin's best friend is Bear, who is a grizzly bear who loves to eat and, in later seasons, has a sister named Beatrice. Franklin's other close friend is Snail, a garden snail who considers Franklin his best friend. One of Franklin's other friends who appears most often in the series is Beaver. Franklin's other friends who appear most often in the series are Goose, Rabbit, Fox, Badger, Raccoon, and Skunk. Mr. Owl is Franklin's primary teacher, but was temporarily replaced by Miss Koala in the film Back to School with Franklin when Mr. Owl was called away on a family emergency.

Other friends who appear include Mr. Mole, Mrs. Muskrat, Coach Porcupine, Moose, Otter, Wolvie, and Bat.

Characters of Goose's family include a mother and father who are revealed to be divorced in Franklin and Friends. Goose's extended family, as seen in "Franklin Migrates", includes her paternal grandmother (who is called Granny) and her maternal grandfather (who is called Grandpa), her maternal aunt and uncle, and her younger maternal cousin, Giselle.

Other characters are seen on the show less often—sometimes appearing in just a few episodes.

- Turtle Household – Franklin, his parents, Mr. and Mrs. Turtle, and Harriet.
- Granny Turtle – Franklin's paternal grandmother who talks a lot and has a nice attic.
- Grandma Jenny Turtle - Franklin's maternal grandmother who has lived her entire life on Faraway Farm.
- Grandpa Turtle - Grandma Jenny's husband and Franklin's maternal grandfather.
- Great-Grandpa Turtle – Shown once on Franklin's Magic Christmas when Grandma Jenny was telling a story about him.
- Great-Grandma and Great-Grandpa Turtle – The parents of Granny who died in a wildfire. Great-Grandma was a great berry picker, and Great-Grandpa was a great fisherman.
- James Turtle – The legal father/stepfather of Grandpa Turtle, the legal father-in-law of Grandma Jenny Turtle, the legal grandfather/step-grandfather of Mrs. Turtle, and the legal great-grandfather/step-great-grandfather of Franklin and Harriet. James died.
- Ivana Turtle – The mother of Grandpa Turtle, the mother-in-law of Grandma Jenny Turtle, the paternal grandmother of Mrs. Turtle, and the great-grandmother of Franklin and Harriet. She was married to James and Bricklin.
- Bricklin Turtle – The biological father of Grandpa Turtle, the father-in-law of Grandma Jenny Turtle, the paternal biological grandfather of Mrs. Turtle, and the great-grandfather of Franklin and Harriet. Grandpa Turtle is Bricklin's biological son.

=== Setting ===
The series takes place in Woodland, a small village in eastern North America inhabited by anthropomorphic animal characters, including Franklin and his family. The village is small enough that most residents know one another and meet regularly. The village is shown to have a small shopping district, roads (with every bit of traffic), and at least one community schoolhouse. It is implied that Woodland is located in the Canadian province of Manitoba; however, this has never been officially confirmed by the show's creators.

- Shopping District – Woodland is known for its substantial shopping district, which includes an ice cream shop, Mr. Mole's hardware store, a pharmacy, a grocery market, a coffee shop, a bookstore, and more. Franklin and his friends sometimes travel here with their parents, with each other, or even by themselves.
- Oakwood School – The schoolhouse in Woodland where Mr. Owl works and Franklin goes to school.
- Tree Fort - A treehouse Franklin's friends built in the episode "Franklin's Fort". At the time, Franklin was afraid of heights, but he overcomes his fear at the end of the episode after he helps a tiny bird. Franklin and his friends would then use it for their activities and to hang out. In the episode "Franklin Plays It Safe", it broke due to falling out of its tree when the branch holding it broke. However, a new one is built at the end.
- Pond – A pond Franklin and his friends are often shown hanging out around, which is attached to a stream. They sometimes swim, sit by the pond, or participate in other activities.
- Woods – Woodland is surrounded by forests on at least one end. A character named Gopher, who appeared in the film Franklin and the Green Knight, is known to live here.
  - Oakwood Ravine – A ravine located within the woods and connected distantly to the playground.
- Nature Trail – The Nature Trail has a picnic ground, the Monarch Meadow, and the Blueberry Hill Lookout.
- Village Park – A park where the child characters go skateboarding.
- Playground – A playground for the younger child characters such as Harriet, Kit, and Beatrice. It has a slide, swings, and monkey bars.
- Tamarack Play Park – An amusement park never seen on the program but is referenced. When Franklin is unable to travel there with all his friends, he creates "Turtle Play Park".
- Faraway Farm – The farm far away from Woodland, where Franklin's maternal grandparents live. Franklin and his family spend Christmas here with his maternal grandparents in the special episode Franklin's Magic Christmas.
- Turtle Lake – An area featured only in the TV special Franklin and the Turtle Lake Treasure. Franklin's Granny lived in this area but lost her home and parents in a fire.
- Woodland Town Hall – The Woodland Town Hall hosts the production of "Sleeping Beauty", which Franklin and his class play in "Franklin's Starring Role".
- Thrill Hill – A steep hill that the older child characters in town like to skateboard down. In one episode, Franklin accidentally skateboards down it and is dared to do it again. At first, he agrees but does not take the dare.
- Blueberry Hill – A hill within a nature park with the most extensive view of the village and its surroundings when the sky is not too cloudy. The name likely references the song.

=== Sports and games ===
Several episodes of the series feature characters playing baseball, but the sport only makes sporadic appearances in later episodes. In these later episodes, ice hockey and soccer are featured more often. In one episode, when Franklin and Bear went to sign up for football, spaces had run out, so they were signed up for basketball instead.

Owing to the show's Canadian roots, ice hockey has an important role in Franklin. It is featured in several stories, including one in which Skunk is taught how to play by Franklin and Bear. Franklin also meets a couple of his professional hockey icons in the fifth and sixth seasons of the program.

In addition to sports, the characters enjoy many other games and activities. Franklin becomes his school's chess champion. Harriet and Beatrice enjoy playing tag and hide-and-seek. Franklin and his friends enjoy playing knights.

== Production ==
=== Development ===
The development design of the character of Franklin was the achievement of Canadian Animation artist and Illustrator Kurt Lehner, which he worked on during his time at the Nelvana studio in 1997. These designs were studies taken directly from the Franklin the Turtle book series itself. Though Lehner did not continue to work with the "series" design team which was hired after the development process, at that time he was also given the privilege of designing Beaver, Rabbit, and Skunk.

In December 2001, Neuroplanet liquidated, leaving 80 employees unemployed. Two former employees of Neuroplanet, Lilian Eche and Ariane Payen, founded LuxAnimation, which animated the show for the 6th and final season.

In May 2004, new episodes of the series began airing on the Canadian network Treehouse TV. Franklin and many of his friends had new voice actors in these new episodes, including actor Grant Eubanks. Many of the show's strongest writers and staff members remained on board, however. Some premises in the new episodes include Franklin facing a flood, worrying about the old treehouse, and earning a badge in a group called the Woodland Trailblazers. For the sixth season, Funbag and other animation studios joined in the development of Franklin. The most recent film in the series is Franklin and the Turtle Lake Treasure. The film was written by John van Bruggen and directed by Dominique Monféry. The 76-minute film premiered in theaters in 2006 and had its debut on Noggin on New Year's Eve 2007, as part of a celebration of the network's conversion to a 24/7 format.

=== Format ===
Franklin is traditionally animated with some computer aid, especially in the later seasons. Franklin is closed-captioned.

Franklin mostly aired with two 11-minute stories, except on CBC in Canada, which splits the stories apart and shows one at a time. The Franklin DVD and video releases include individual stories grouped together as part of a theme, rather than complete episodes. Unlike many animated children's programs, Franklin has no interstitial segments or end-tags featuring the characters. The scenes shown in the animated opening introduction were changed after the show's first season. Many of these scenes featured Otter, a character who left the series early in the first season and was only seen once more in later seasons.

Differences in the colouring of the cartoon can be spotted from season to season. The more recent feature films, most noticeably Back to School with Franklin have a somewhat different look from the television series. The film Franklin and the Turtle Lake Treasure had considerably higher production value, with more colour differentiation between the other turtles, higher quality animation, an overall brighter look, and painted backgrounds.

== Release ==
=== Broadcast ===
In Canada, the series aired on CBC Television, Family Channel, and Treehouse TV.

In the United States, it aired on CBS as part of their Saturday-morning CBS Kidshow block from October 3, 1998 to January 2, 1999. It later returned to CBS as part of Nick Jr. on CBS for 2 years from September 16, 2000, to September 7, 2002. It also aired on Nickelodeon as part of the Nick Jr. programming block from January 11, 1999, to July 30, 2004. It aired on the Noggin channel from October 4, 1999, until September 25, 2009, and returned to Noggin on August 26, 2015, after the brand was relaunched as a streaming service. It was available on the Noggin streaming service until September 30, 2018. It also aired on the Nick Jr. Channel from September 28, 2009, until June 14, 2013. Seven years later, it moved to Qubo and aired from January 1, 2021, until February 28 of the same year, when the network ceased operations.

In the United Kingdom, Franklin aired on Sky One from March 21, 1998, until May 27, 2000, Channel 4 from November 1, 1998, until August 31, 2004, Tiny Living from April 2001 to May 2002, Nick Jr. from 1999 to 2008, Five in 2004, and Tiny Pop in 2012 (in which it was dubbed with British voice actors on those channels, replacing the original Canadian soundtrack) in 2007. It has also been broadcast in India on Pogo, along with another animated series, Angelina Ballerina.

In Australia, it aired on ABC.

In the Arab World, it aired on Spacetoon from 2004 to 2015.

=== Home media ===
Title	Release date	Format
Franklin Plays the Game	July 14, 1998	
Franklin and the Secret Club	July 14, 1998	
Franklin's Halloween	September 1, 1998	
Franklin's Valentines	January 12, 1999	
Franklin and the Tooth Fairy	July 20, 1999	
Franklin Goes to School	July 20, 1999	
Franklin's Christmas Gift	October 12, 1999	
Franklin's Birthday Party	February 8, 2000	
Franklin Plants a Tree	February 8, 2000	
Franklin in the Dark	June 6, 2000	
Franklin's Blanket	June 6, 2000	
Franklin's Summer Vacations	July 17, 2001	
Franklin's Reading Adventures	July 17, 2001	
Franklin Family Bonds	April 16, 2002	
Franklin The Show Must Go On	April 16, 2002	

== Reception ==
The show was well-received by critics and parents. Joly Herman of Common Sense Media stated in a review, "Franklin is a show that takes for granted respect for elders and vice versa. There's no whining, fighting, yelling, provocation, or aggravation. Franklin ultimately sets a good example of responsible TV programming, and it is a rare show that celebrates the innocence of childhood."

== In other media ==
=== Books and movies ===
Franklin television stories are mostly based on books in the original Franklin Adventure series. The practice of adapting television stories from books was dropped in the program's second season, though elements and dialogue from some of the books are incorporated into later stories. Although, many Franklin television stories have been made into books in the Franklin TV Storybook and Franklin First Readers series. Usually written by Sharon Jennings, these adaptations are shortened versions of what is seen on TV.

On September 11, 2000, Franklin's younger sister Harriet was introduced in the direct-to-video and DVD movie Franklin and the Green Knight. The two shared an adventure on November 24, 2001, in Franklin's Magic Christmas. Back to School with Franklin was released direct-to-video on August 19, 2003, which involved Harriet befriending Beaver's younger brother Kit, and new character Mrs. Koala introduced as a teacher to Franklin and his friends.

=== Live tours ===
Franklin has been seen in numerous touring stage shows, including "Franklin's Big Adventure", "Franklin's Class Concert", "Franklin's Family Christmas Concert", and "Franklin's Carnival Of Animals". Produced by Koba Entertainment and presented by Paquin Entertainment, these stage shows featured a number of songs including "Come See the World", "What I Do in the Morning" and "The Dinosaur Song".

In 2009, a new touring show, "Franklin and The Adventures of the Noble Knights", was developed, and is currently touring in France. The show is also produced by Koba Entertainment, and presented by Paquin Entertainment. The Director/Choreographer is Patti Caplette. This show toured in Canada in 2010. A soundtrack CD featuring the songs from the programme is now available.

=== Video games ===
Three educational video games, Franklin's Activity Center, Franklin's Reading World and Franklin Learns Math were published by Sanctuary Woods, Multimedia Corporation and released for PC in 1995 and 1996. In 2000, Nelvana and Knowledge Adventure, Inc. developed two PC games, Franklin the Turtle Goes to School and Franklin the Turtle's Clubhouse. In 2004, Nelvana also developed an educational PC game called Franklin the Turtle After School. Between 2005 and 2006, The Game Factory released Franklin the Turtle and Franklin's Great Adventures in 2005, and Franklin's Birthday Surprise on April 18, 2006.

=== CGI series ===
On September 27, 2010, Nelvana announced that it had begun production on a new all-CGI Franklin series called Franklin and Friends. The series has been ordered for 52 episodes and the characters that return in the series are Bear, Fox, Rabbit, Beaver, Goose, Snail and, naturally, Franklin. Additionally, the series features a new regular character, Franklin's paternal aunt named Aunt T., described as "quirky". The series "features special themes, including fun mysteries, Woodland events and outdoor activities." This is a Canada-Singapore joint venture between Nelvana and Infinite Frameworks Pte. Ltd.

The series officially premiered on Treehouse TV on March 4, 2011. A US release date had been announced on the Nick Jr. Channel Franklin webpage for February 13, 2012. It also premiered in Singapore on Mediacorp on February 15, 2012.
