= Franklin and the Green Knight =

- Directed by: John van Bruggen
- Written by: Betty Quan
- Based on: Franklin the Turtle by Paulette Bourgeois; Brenda Clark
- Produced by: Merle Anne Ridley
- Starring: Noah Reid; Elizabeth Saunders (as Elizabeth Brown); Luca Perlman; Kyle Fairlie; Ali Mukaddam; Olivia Garratt; Shirley Douglas; Kristen Bone; Juan Chioran; Paul Essiembre; Jonathan Wilson; Richard Newman; Ruby Smith-Merovitz; James Rankin; Gary Krawford; Valerie Boyle; Adrian Truss; Elizabeth Hanna; Catherine Disher; Paul Haddad; Jim Jones; Debra McGrath; Annick Obonsawin
- Music by: Ray Parker; Tom Szczesniak
- Production company: Nelvana
- Distributed by: Kaboom! Entertainment; Universal Pictures Home Entertainment
- Release date: October 17, 2000
- Running time: 77 minutes
- Country: Canada
- Language: English

Franklin and the Green Knight (also known as Franklin and the Green Knight: The Movie) is a 2000 Canadian animated adventure film directed by John van Bruggen and written by Betty Quan. The first Franklin film, Franklin and the Green Knight was released direct-to-video on October 17, 2000, and was later released on DVD. The film has a runtime of 77 minutes and follows Franklin setting out to help spring arrive with the help of his friend, Snail. It has since aired on Noggin and Nick Jr. in the United States in 2004, and Canada's Family Channel.

== Plot ==
Franklin Turtle is excited about the coming of spring and the baby his parents will get, but it is still winter. Franklin's mom tells him about the Green Knight to cheer him up when he had brought spring to the kingdom and an idea of how to bring spring himself.

== Voice actors ==
- Noah Reid as Franklin Turtle
- Luca Perlman as Bear
- Olivia Garratt as Goose
- Kyle Fairlie as Rabbit
- Kristen Bone as Snail
- Leah Cudmore as Beaver
- Richard Newman as Mr. Turtle
- Elizabeth Saunders (as Elizabeth Brown) as Mrs. Turtle
- Juan Chioran as Green Knight
- Paul Essiembre as Squire
- Jonathan Wilson as Goblin
- Gary Krawford as Lynx
- Ruby Smith-Merovitz as Badger
- Ali Mukaddam as Fox
- James Rankin as Mr. Owl
- Corinne Conley as Granny Turtle
- Valerie Boyle as Mrs. Beaver
- Adrian Truss as Mr. Beaver
- Elizabeth Hanna as Mrs. Fox and Eagle
- Catherine Disher as Mrs. Goose
- Paul Haddad as Mr. Fox
- Jim Jones as Mr. Gopher
- Debra McGrath as Mrs. Warbler
- Annick Obonsawin as Armadillo
- Shirley Douglas as Narrator

== Songs ==
- "Brothers and Sisters" by Leah Cudmore, Laura Lynn, Luca Perlman, Noah Reid, Liz Soderberg and Cassandra Vasik
- "Spring Where Are You?" by Kristen Bone, Leah Cudmore, Laura Lynn, Luca Perlman, Noah Reid, Liz Soderberg and Cassandra Vasik
- "I Wonder" by Noah Reid and Kristen Bone
- "Franklin Theme" by Bruce Cockburn (Ending credits)
