= List of Franklin episodes =

This is a list of episodes from the children's television series Franklin.

== Series overview ==
Season	Episodes	Originally released	
Season	Episodes	First released	Last released
1	13	November 3, 1997	January 26, 1998
2	13	September 7, 1998	November 30, 1998
3	13	October 11, 1999	February 21, 2000
4	13	May 8, 2000	July 30, 2000
5	13	April 29, 2002	July 22, 2002
6	13	May 22, 2004	August 8, 2004

== Episodes ==
=== Season 1 (1997–98) ===
No. overall	No. in season	Title	Written by	Original release date
1	1	"Franklin Plays the Game / Franklin Wants a Pet"	Peter Sauder	November 3, 1997
Franklin's soccer team has never scored a goal before. With the help of coach Porcupine, the team learns to work together and to have fun as a team.; Franklin tries to prove to his parents that he is responsible enough to own a pet.
2	2	"Hurry Up, Franklin / Franklin's Bad Day"	Nicola Barton / Bob Ardiel	November 6, 1997
Franklin tries to hurry to get to Bear's birthday party on time. Snail is upset that he is normally too slow to attend parties.; Franklin becomes very upset after his close friend Otter moves away; but has trouble expressing his emotions, which result in the turtle having a tumultuous day until his father consoles him.
3	3	"Franklin Goes to School / Franklin Is Lost"	Bob Ardiel / Frank Diteljan	November 10, 1997
Franklin and Snail are nervous about the first day of school but finally had fun together when they meet their schoolteacher, Mr. Owl.; In a game of Hide-n-Seek, Franklin and Fox get themselves lost in the forest.
4	4	"Franklin Has a Sleepover / Franklin's Halloween"	Nicola Barton / Frank Diteljan	November 13, 1997
Franklin invites Bear over to his house for their very first sleepover. However, Bear has trouble adjusting to the sleeping arrangement away from home and feels homesick.; Bear volunteers to be the first person to walk through the annual Haunted House. But when he ends up sick in bed with a cold, Franklin warily volunteers to be the first one to walk through. Franklin and his friends later find out that the ghost they have been seeing at the Halloween party is actually their schoolteacher, Mr. Owl.
5	5	"Franklin Rides a Bike / Franklin Is Messy"	Maureen Paxton / Bob Ardiel	November 20, 1997
Franklin tries to learn to ride a bicycle without training wheels, but this proves to be harder than he anticipated.; Franklin learns a valuable lesson in picking up after himself.
6	6	"Franklin Fibs / Franklin's Blanket"	Nicola Barton	November 27, 1997
Franklin makes up a lie that he can eat 76 flies "in the blink of an eye".; Franklin is worried because his blue blanket goes missing the day before a sleepover at his Aunt Turtle's house.
7	7	"Franklin Is Bossy / Franklin's Fort"	Nicola Barton / Bob Ardiel	December 8, 1997
Franklin's bossy attitude doesn't bode well with his friends.; Franklin's friends build a tree fort to which Franklin tries to overcome his fear of heights.
8	8	"Finders Keepers for Franklin / Franklin's New Friend"	Bonnie Chung / Peter Sauder	December 15, 1997
When Franklin finds a lost camera, he is torn between "finders-keepers". His opinion later changes when he loses his stuffed dog, Sam, and the roles are reversed.; A new friend, Moose, comes to school, but because he's different, Franklin doesn't know if he can be friends with him.
9	9	"Franklin's School Play / Franklin and the Secret Club"	Maureen Paxton / Bob Ardiel	December 25, 1997
Franklin gets stage fright during a production of The Nutcracker.; All of Franklin's friends are allowed to join Porcupine's exclusive club; however, Franklin and Snail are not allowed and feel left out.
10	10	"Franklin and the Red Scooter / Franklin in the Dark"	Bob Ardiel / Peter Sauder & Bob Ardiel	January 5, 1998
Franklin unsuccessfully tries to earn money to buy a scooter, but eventually makes a temporary swap for Rabbit's.; At bedtime, Franklin is afraid to go into his small, dark shell. To help, his mother tells him the story of "Little Turtle", and his father gives Franklin a jar of fireflies to use as a nightlight.
11	11	"Franklin and the Tooth Fairy / Franklin Takes the Blame"	Nicola Barton	January 12, 1998
When Bear loses his first baby tooth, Franklin learns about the tooth fairy; but because turtles don't have teeth, Franklin becomes discouraged and tries to trick the tooth fairy with a pebble.; Franklin offers to take care of Mr. Mole's flower garden while he is away on holiday. However, Franklin ends up neglecting to water the garden and tries to hide his mistake, which only makes things worse.
12	12	"Franklin's Christmas Gift / Franklin's Granny"	Maureen Paxton / Nicola Barton	January 19, 1998
Franklin has to decide which gift he will give to the toy drive for Christmas.; Franklin visits his Granny for the day but would rather be playing with his friends. Franklin later learns how much his visits mean to his Granny, and that there is much more to her than he thought.
13	13	"Franklin and the Baby / Franklin Goes to Day Camp"	Bonnie Chung / Frank Diteljan	January 26, 1998
Bear struggles to adjust when his new baby sister is born. With reassurance from his parents, Bear learns to adjust and comes to enjoy the role of being a big brother.; At day camp, Bear spending more time with Possum makes Franklin feel left out, until Bear consoles him.

=== Season 2 (1998) ===
No. overall	No. in season	Title	Written by	Original release date
14	1	"Franklin's Visitor / Franklin's Not-So-Broken Bone"	Mark Mayerson / Nicola Barton	September 7, 1998
Franklin finds a fish friend for Goldie, and Mr. Mole's grandson visits Franklin as well. However, the new fish and Mr. Mole's grandson become a little mischievous and don't share Franklin and Goldie's interests to play.; After learning that Skunk is receiving a lot of attention due to her broken arm, Franklin lets Bear put a papier-mâché cast on his arm so he can get the same, but it proves to be a hindrance.
15	2	"Franklin's Gift / Franklin Growing Up Fast"	Nicola Barton / Patrick Granleese	September 14, 1998
Seeing his friend's Mother's Day gifts that have a use makes Franklin think his isn't special enough, until his mother sees it for herself.; Franklin feels he has grown up overnight. Bear makes him have second thoughts about growing up, but Franklin's parents tell him it doesn't happen that quickly.
16	3	"Franklin the Spy / Franklin's Library Book"	Ken Ross	September 21, 1998
Franklin's and Bear's serious spy business ruins Badger and Beaver's puppet show, but the two make it up to them.; Franklin forgets his library book which gets ruined in the rain, but is afraid to confess until his parents tell him what responsibility is.
17	4	"Franklin's Kite / Franklin and the Babysitter"	Bonnie Chung / Nicola Barton	September 28, 1998
Franklin damages his kite and lets Fox take it. Franklin and Bear learn from Fox's father how to reuse junk into something useful.; Franklin avoids his substitute babysitter Mrs. Muskrat. They come to like each other after getting out of a locked closet.
18	5	"Franklin and the Broken Globe / Franklin's Valentines"	Ken Ross / Nicola Barton	October 5, 1998
Goose becomes pessimistic thinking she broke the class globe, until Franklin and Bear admit their folly.; Franklin's Valentines are lost and ruined from a breeze, but his friends understand what happened and he makes some Friendship cards the next day.
19	6	"Franklin's Family Treasure / Franklin's Music Lessons"	Patrick Granleese / Mark Mayerson	October 12, 1998
Franklin carelessly trades away his grandfather's old penny whistle. Granny and Franklin follow a trail to get it back.; Franklin and Beaver take piano lessons from Granny to impress Ms. Panda. Beaver excels, but Franklin doesn't have the patience.
20	7	"Franklin Takes a Trip / Franklin's Bicycle Helmet"	Ken Ross / Nicola Barton	October 19, 1998
Franklin and his parents go on a vacation, where he expects it to be somewhere with fun rides, but is disappointed to discover it's at a pioneer village. As it happens, he enjoys all the different chores, while his parents are exhausted, but are content that Franklin likes it after all.; Franklin hides his bike and helmet thinking he'll be laughed at, but is told that he needs to wear it if he wants to pass the safety course.
21	8	"Franklin's Birthday Party / Franklin's Nickname"	Frank Diteljan	October 26, 1998
Franklin thinks it won't be much fun to hold his birthday party at home, but his parents help make the party extra special.; Franklin and his friends get a nickname, which soon escalates into a bad name game.
22	9	"Franklin and Otter's Visit / Franklin's Collection"	Ken Ross / Patrick Granleese	November 2, 1998
Otter visits Franklin. However, her interests have changed and the changes in the village are not to her liking.; For show and tell, the class has to show their personal collection they have made, but Franklin doesn't have any and has to spend the weekend trying to find one. He finally takes an interest in rocks, which doesn't seem to interest any of the kids at first, until Mr. Owl talks about each of their histories.
23	10	"Franklin Says Sorry / Franklin and the Fire"	Nicola Barton / Ken Ross	November 9, 1998
Bear quarrels with Franklin after he blabs to Fox about Bear's secret flag he made for the tree fort. With help from Beaver, Snail, and Fox, Franklin manages to sincerely apologize.; Franklin takes many precautions in his own house. With help from his parents, he learns professional fire safety tips.
24	11	"Franklin's Garden / Franklin Runs Away"	Nicola Barton / Bonnie Chung	November 16, 1998
Franklin finds a caterpillar, but it eats his flowers. Mr. Mole teaches him that this is the natural way of garden animals.; With everyone mad at him, Franklin runs off with Snail to the tree fort.
25	12	"Franklin's Gloomy Day / Franklin Tells Time"	Nicola Barton / Rick Jones & Lynn Mason	November 23, 1998
On a rainy day, Franklin is bored. Whatever stifles his boredom is short lived, until his parents teach him how to play by himself.; Franklin fails to understand hours and minutes, making him lack punctuality. Mr. Owl helps Franklin understand time better.
26	13	"Franklin's Test / Franklin and the Duckling"	Ken Ross / Nicola Barton	November 30, 1998
Franklin readies himself for the school spelling test, but he cheats on the last word. Full of guilt, Franklin confesses to Mr. Owl.; Franklin takes a lonely duckling home, who proves to be quite a handful. Franklin finally brings the duckling back to its family.

=== Season 3 (1999–00) ===
No. overall	No. in season	Title	Written by	Original release date
27	1	"Franklin and His Night Friend / Franklin and the Two Henrys"	Brian Lasenby / John Van Bruggen	October 11, 1999
Franklin makes friends with a bat named Bat, but problems emerge when they can't meet because Bat is nocturnal.; Bear loses Beaver's pet hamster, Henry, while watching him when she's on vacation. He buys another hamster to take its place, before admitting his lie. Henry ends up showing up and Bear gets to keep the new hamster, calling it Henry II.
28	2	"Frankin's Nature Hike / Franklin's Starring Role"	Nicola Barton / Kim Thompson	October 18, 1999
Franklin helps Snail a bit too much during a nature walk with Bear, Beaver, Fox, and Goose.; Franklin feels sad when he doesn't get a big part in the school's production of Sleeping Beauty, thinking he won't get the same attention as a stage manager, not until he realizes how important his role is.
29	3	"Franklin's Masterpiece / Franklin and the Computer"	James Backshall / Lynn Mason	October 25, 1999
Franklin wins a contest with a painting that he, Bear, Beaver, and Fox painted.; Franklin spends too much time on Beaver's computer game, Dam Builders. Beaver thinks that Franklin is more interested in the game than spending time with her, who comes to his senses and puts his friend before the game.
30	4	"Franklin the Trooper / Franklin's Fossil"	Laura Kosterski / Brian Lasenby	November 1, 1999
Franklin helps Mrs. Muskrat repair her old boat. He figures it will only take a short time, but when it turns into a big job, he considers given up, until he discovers she renamed her boat after him in gratitude for his help.; Franklin and Bear discover a trilobite fossil in the garden. They make a museum with the fossil as the focal point, but lose customers because they don't know anything about it.
31	5	"Franklin and the Fortune Teller / Franklin's Cellar"	Bridget Newson / Ken Ross	November 8, 1999
Beaver tells Franklin that he will have a bad day, so Franklin becomes cautious the following day and ends up missing out on a lot of great stuff.; Franklin is afraid of going down into the cellar, for fear of the monsters that live there. The fear spreads across Beaver, Bear, and Goose, until they realize that it's their imagination getting the best of them which is also what they use to "fight the monsters" as superheroes.
32	6	"Franklin Plants a Tree / Franklin the Hero"	Brian Lasenby / Shane MacDougall	November 22, 1999
Franklin's preconceived notions about trees are turned upside down when he gets the responsibility of planting one.; Franklin and Snail want to get signed copies of the new Dynaroo comic from Dynaroo herself, but have to help Mrs. Muskrat get into her house after she lost her key in the snow. They get to Mr. Heron's shop a little too late, but Dynaroo stuck around after Mrs. Muskrat called ahead to tell of their good deed.
33	7	"Franklin's Day Off / Franklin's Homemade Cookies"	Nicole Keefler / Nicola Barton	November 26, 1999
Franklin would rather go on a bike ride with Bear, than put away his makeshift tent, but then he has a flat tire which leads him into all kinds of problems that could've been prevented if he had put away the tent days ago.; Franklin thinks it's better to tell the truth, but isn't so sure when it comes to the ill-received cookies he made, which have too much ginger in them.
34	8	"Franklin the Fabulous / Franklin Camps Out"	Paula Butorac / Nicola Barton	December 6, 1999
Franklin tries to learn magic like a famous magician, Marten the Magnificent.; Franklin becomes too dependent on his friends when they were on a camp out. Eventually they get sick of it and stop. At night, the wind wakes Franklin up who sees the tent in danger, and with Bear asleep, he learns to be self sufficient in tying it down securely by himself.
35	9	"Franklin and the Puppy / Franklin Takes the Bus"	Ken Ross / Bridget Newson	January 17, 2000
A lost puppy follows Franklin around, and Franklin wants to keep him.; Franklin takes the school's bus without asking.
36	10	"Franklin and the Copycat / Big Brother Franklin"	Laura Kosterski / Nicola Barton	January 31, 2000
Rabbit steals Franklin's technique for drawing storm clouds.; A young boy named Squirrel hangs out with Franklin, Fox, and Raccoon.
37	11	"Franklin and the Grump / Franklin's Promise"	Ken Ross / Neal Colgrass	February 7, 2000
Mr. Groundhog gets grumpy during February 2nd, and Franklin tries to find out why.; Mr. Turtle promises to fix Franklin's bike, but only after he fixes a sprinkler, which may take more time than originally intended.
38	12	"Franklin and the Thunderstorm / Franklin's Maple Syrup"	Leah Lepofsky / Brian Lasenby	February 14, 2000
Franklin doesn't want his friends to know that he is afraid of thunderstorms.; Franklin and Bear compete with Beaver and Fox for who will make the best maple syrup.
39	13	"Franklin Helps Out / Franklin's Missing Snacks"	Dave Dias / Brian Lasenby	February 21, 2000
Franklin can't find a job to help with in the community.; Bear is accused of eating all of the snacks his friends stored away for safe keeping.

=== Season 4 (2000) ===
No. overall	No. in season	Title	Written by	Original release date
40	1	"Franklin's Good Deeds / Franklin's Submarine"	Brian Lasenby	May 8, 2000
Franklin tries to do a good deed in order to get journalist Mr. Coyote to get him into the newspaper.; Franklin receives a submarine by mail that isn't at all what he imagined it to be.
41	2	"Mr. Fix-It Franklin / Franklin Has the Hiccups"	James Backshall / Kim Thompson	May 15, 2000
Franklin gets to help out around the house on small fix-it jobs. He then tries to apply it to helping his friends, which seem to work at first, until he finds out that his fixes caused bigger messes. However, his friends forgive him and his parents tell him that learning from one's mistakes is experience, too. And with his father's help, he does it again the right way.; Franklin gets nervous about a forthcoming chess championship being held at his school.
42	3	"Franklin Delivers / Franklin's Shell Trouble"	John Van Bruggen / Nicola Barton	May 22, 2000
Franklin and Bear are eager to deliver newspapers while the local paperboy is away for the weekend. They soon find out that windy Saturdays are much better for flying kites than delivering papers.; Franklin's shell is peeling due to having Carapace Eczema and is treated with an embarrassing ointment. He then tries various ways to hide this from his friends.
43	4	"Franklin's Sailboat / Franklin Snoops"	Jennifer Pertsch / Laura Kosterski	May 29, 2000
Franklin thinks that a newer, prettier sailboat in Mr. Mole's store is better than his older, run-down sailboat he currently owns. He waits for his father to fix his old run up, but runs out of patience and buys the new boat, only it looks better than it swims. In the meantime, Mr. Turtle fixes his old boat up, so Franklin gives the new boat as a trophy to his dad in gratitude.; Franklin accidentally snoops on Bear's birthday present and tells him it's an action figure. He then convinces his friends into buying all the accessories, but when he finds out the action figure was for his own birthday, Franklin gives it to Bear to avoid revealing the truth so nobody is let down.
44	5	"Franklin's Father / Franklin Plays Hockey"	Ken Ross / Brian Lasenby	June 4, 2000
Mr. Mole tells Franklin stories of his father's childhood mistakes while he and Franklin wait at the train station for Franklin's mother.; Franklin and Bear help Skunk get ready for hockey season.
45	6	"Franklin and the Puppet Play / Franklin's Stopwatch"	John Van Bruggen / Brian Lasenby	June 11, 2000
Beaver becomes too bossy during a production of a Little Red Riding Hood puppet play.; Franklin discovers how slow he actually is when he gets his hands on a stopwatch.
46	7	"Franklin Meets Ermine / Franklin's Funny Business"	Kim Thompson / Brian Lasenby	June 18, 2000
Franklin's friends don't believe him when he explains that a different kid wreaks havoc on his fun.; Franklin and Rabbit get too much into playing practical jokes being played on their friends.
47	8	"Franklin and Sam / Franklin's Berry Patch"	Ken Ross / Brian Lasenby	June 25, 2000
Franklin tries to hide Sam while on a camping trip with his friends.; Franklin and Bear try to hide a secret berry patch all to themselves.
48	9	"Franklin's Rival / Franklin and the Trading Cards"	Bonnie Chung / John Van Bruggen	July 2, 2000
Franklin feels challenged by the affections of another kid Granny is babysitting.; Franklin gets an extra copy of a rare trading card and has to decide whether to give it to Beaver or Fox.
49	10	"Franklin's Robot / Franklin the Detective"	Jennifer Pertsch / Brian Lasenby	July 9, 2000
Franklin and Fox try to build a robot. When their friends Beaver and Badger mock their simple made one that doesn't actually do anything, they each take turns wearing the robot suit and are forced to do the chores Rabbit, Goose, Beaver and Badger think they are ordering it to do.; Franklin tries to find out where the ball went during a game of baseball played by Beaver, Fox and Raccoon. All the clues point to it falling in the river, but Bear points out that it knocked down a branch as it got stuck in a tree.
50	11	"Franklin the Fearless / Franklin's Lucky Charm"	Brian Lasenby / Patrick Granleese	July 16, 2000
Franklin's friends think that he is fearless going down Thrill Hill, the steepest hill in all of Woodland.; Bear feels unlucky, so Franklin gives him a fake four-leaf clover to try and boost his luck.
51	12	"Franklin at the Seashore / Franklin and Snail's Dream"	Kim Thompson / Laura Kosterski	July 23, 2000
Franklin and Bear accuse two crabs of stealing their seashells.; Snail wants to learn how to fly, but everyone else thinks it's ridiculous and dangerous, except for Franklin.
52	13	"My Franklin / Franklin's Mom"	Nicola Barton / Brian Lasenby	July 30, 2000
Franklin and Bear want to play in the park, but Bear's younger sister keeps calling out to them. It makes Bear jealous, but they realize that she was actually calling out to Franklin because Bear was too busy.; Bear, Franklin and his family prepare to go out for a camping trip. While packing up, Mr. Turtle accidentally drops a frying pan and it lands on his foot which gives him serious injuries, forcing him to back out of the vacation. Mrs. Turtle takes care of the rest of the work, which has some differences than what Mr. Turtle does.

=== Season 5 (2002) ===
No. overall	No. in season	Title	Written by	Original release date
53	1	"Franklin the Teacher / Franklin's Allergy"	Brian Lasenby / Bridget Newson	April 29, 2002
Franklin tries to teach Harriet so she will be ready for preschool. Nothing seems to work, until his family discover that it was playing with Harriet before that actually taught her to hammer her own unsturdy chair.; Franklin fears he's allergic to his best friend, Bear and they attempt to avoid each other until they find out it was Bear's new bubble bath.
54	2	"Franklin Loses a Book / Franklin and Betty"	Brian Lasenby / Betty Quan	May 6, 2002
Franklin gets sick of reading Harriet's favorite book, The Happy Green Frog, so he decides to hide it inside a newspaper until her naptime. However, the book ends up missing after the newspaper ends up in the garbage with the book inside of it. Franklin and Bear search for another copy to replace the one Franklin lost. When he does, he finds out the pages are half missing, but is able to recall the story from memory.; Franklin gets along really well with Beaver's cousin, Betty, but when the other kids start referring to them as a couple, he tries to avoid seeing her until he finds out that she changed her plans to spend time with him. He apologizes and they go back to playing.
55	3	"Franklin's Pumpkin / Franklin's Jug Band"	Brian Lasenby / Bonnie Chung	May 13, 2002
Franklin and Bear grow a huge pumpkin for a contest, but when it breaks, Mrs. Muskrat helps them turn it into a pie, which is just as successful.; Harriet is playing Franklin's clarinet, which he needs to start a band with Bear and Beaver. He trades it for his drum, but when he finds out the clarinet is too messy, he tries getting the drum back.
56	4	"Franklin and the Bus Patrol / Franklin and Wolvie"	Brian Lasenby	May 20, 2002
Nobody likes Bear's strict rules as bus monitor, thinking that Franklin would be much better. But when Franklin's easy going attitude gets them all in trouble with the bus driver, they realize.; Franklin finds it hard to play with Wolvie who plays rough, due to always having to match his older brothers. When Wolvie finds out, he plays more friendlier even with his little sister Harriet.
57	5	"Franklin Stays Up / Franklin's Bargain"	Brian Lasenby	May 27, 2002
While camping, the kids decide to stay up all night to watch the sunrise, but Bear and Snail give up, while Franklin and Rabbit struggle right up until sunrise when they fall asleep and Bear and Snail wake up.; Franklin gets an early allowance in exchange for helping his dad with gardening, but he keeps putting it off to play with his new toy. Mr. Turtle ends up doing it because it can't be held off any longer. Franklin makes up for it by doing the dishes, while he plays with his sister, instead.
58	6	"Franklin's Big Game / Franklin's Reading Club"	Ken Ross / Brian Lasenby	June 3, 2002
Mr. Mole arranges for a friendly match between Franklin and his friends and a professional polar bear team. The kids start fretting the worst, until they just decide to do their best and have fun. When they get there, the polar bears mix it up by taking some kids and going onto Franklin's team to make it fair.; Franklin and Bear try to read as many books as possible to receive special t-shirts from the library, but when they realize they haven't learnt anything, while their friends took their time, they go back and start over.
59	7	"Franklin in Two Places / Franklin's First Star"	Pete Sauder / Brian Lasenby	June 10, 2002
Franklin overextends himself when he tries to attend Bear's ball game and Beaver's art show at the same time.; Franklin and Bear are big fans of professional hockey player Coyote (voiced by Elijah Wood), but when they meet him, he tells them that his idol is Mrs. Muskrat, who was always there to support him and others when he was younger. After Franklin and Bear's hockey game, they announce Mrs. Muskrat as run of its stars.
60	8	"Franklin's Float / Franklin's Party Plans"	Brian Lasenby / Betty Quan	June 17, 2002
The kids build a big spaceship for the parade, but it is too heavy to move. Mr. Fox helps them to make it to the parade on time.; Franklin learns from Skunk that she and her family are moving, but misunderstands along with Bear, Beaver and Goose, and they think she's moving out of Woodland. In the end, it turns out that Skunk is moving just around the corner and still going to be in Woodland.
61	9	"Gee Whiz Franklin / Franklin Can't Wait"	Simon Racioppa & Richard Elliott / Bruce Robb	June 24, 2002
Franklin and Bear try a 24-hour challenge of Gee Whiz magazine to get their pictures in the next release.; Franklin is bored when he has to wait 2 hours before a circus show starts.
62	10	"Franklin's Spring First / Franklin Plays Golf"	Ken Ross / Bruce Robb	July 1, 2002
Franklin tries to celebrate his own holiday.; Franklin plays golf with his dad, but is afraid to tell him he would rather go play soccer with his friends.
63	11	"Franklin's Canoe Trip / Franklin's Interview"	Brian Lasenby / Bridget Newson	July 8, 2002
Franklin, Mr. Turtle and Bear go for a canoe trip, but soon they realize it takes more work than they initially thought.; Franklin has a hard time to find someone special to make an interview with.
64	12	"Franklin's Crystal / Franklin's Advice"	Brian Lasenby / Karen Moonah	July 15, 2002
Franklin and Beaver find a quartz crystal in the pond, but have trouble sharing it.; Snail cracks his shell during a soccer game.
65	13	"Franklin's Cookie Question / Franklin's Picnic"	Bruce Robb / Brian Lasenby	July 22, 2002
Franklin and Bear can't resist cookies they had baked, so Bear gets his hand stuck inside a jar where Mrs. Bear hid the cookies.; Franklin refuses to eat spinach because he thinks he will not like it.

=== Season 6 (2004) ===
No. overall	No. in season	Title	Written by	Original release date
66	1	"Franklin Itching to Skateboard / Franklin Forgives"	Brian Lasenby / Karen Moonah	May 22, 2004
Franklin and Bear's idea for skateboarding doesn't go as well as they wanted.; Franklin brings Goldie to his family picnic. After Harriet accidentally knocks Goldie into the pond, Franklin has trouble forgiving her.
67	2	"Hockey Fan Franklin / Mother Hen Franklin"	Simon Racioppa & Richard Elliott / Brian Lasenby	May 30, 2004
Franklin gets nervous jitters after winning a contest to meet his favourite hockey star.; Franklin becomes overly protective of Harriet after she gets an injury.
68	3	"Franklin's Badge / Franklin Stargazes"	Karen Moonah / John Van Bruggen	June 6, 2004
Franklin joins the Woodland Trailblazer troop, finding that there is much more to it than simply earning badges.; Franklin trades away his new telescope before realising its potential. He tries to get it back and ends up striking a bargain.
69	4	"Franklin's Swimming Party / Franklin's Soccer Field Folly"	Karen Moonah / Brian Lasenby	June 12, 2004
The kids have a swimming party on their last day of school.; Franklin is embarrassed after he scores a soccer goal for the opposing team.
70	5	"Franklin the Weather Turtle / Franklin's Dance Lessons"	John Van Bruggen / Brian Lasenby	June 14, 2004
Franklin is an aspiring meteorologist after spending time with Mr. Groundhog.; Franklin initially tries to get out of dance lessons before learning it can be fun.
71	6	"Franklin in Charge / Franklin's UFO"	Simon Racioppa & Richard Elliott / Brian Lasenby	June 19, 2004
Franklin takes on Mr. Turtle's household chores. He finds that he can't do it all, and doesn't have to.; Franklin and Rabbit chase after UFOs after reading a newspaper article. They consult with Mr. Mole for advice.
72	7	"Franklin Migrates / Franklin the Photographer"	Karen Moonah / John Van Bruggen	June 20, 2004
Franklin learns about Migration Celebration from Goose and joins in the celebration with her, her parents, Mr. Goose's mother, Mrs. Goose's father, older brother and sister and their daughter.; Beaver starts a camera club at school. Franklin tries to get a picture of a butterfly, but finds it to be a difficult task.
73	8	"Franklin's Word / Franklin's Pond Phantom"	Dale Schott / Brian Lasenby	June 26, 2004
Franklin accidentally says the word "stupid" in front of Harriet, and is worried she will repeat the word in front of his parents.; Franklin and Bear scare their friends with a tall tale about a sea-serpent called Michiochi that supposedly dwells in the Woodland Pond.
74	9	"Franklin the Coach / Franklin Plays It Safe"	Karen Moonah / Brian Lasenby	June 28, 2004
With Coach Porcupine away, Franklin takes her place. Feeling he is out of his depth, Beaver takes the job.; After some lessons from the safety inspector Mr. Marmot, Franklin and Bear alienate their friends when they stop their friends from doing potentially unsafe things.
75	10	"Franklin's Favorite Card / Franklin's Expedition"	Sheila Dinsmore / Dale Schott	July 24, 2004
When Bear returns Franklin's soccer cards, Franklin thinks Bear lost his favorite one. This leads to a rift in their friendship.; Franklin and Bear go on an expedition for the Woodland Trailblazers. They decide to go on a hike together, but everything they planned seems to go wrong.
76	11	"Franklin's Bike-a-Thon / Franklin's Candy Caper"	Shawn Kalb / Bob Ardiel	July 25, 2004
Franklin participates in a charity ride for a new library computer.; When Franklin puts a strange penny in Mr. Mole's candy machine, all of the candy comes out.
77	12	"Franklin's Go-Cart Race / Sir Franklin's Squire"	Brian Lasenby / John Van Bruggen	August 1, 2004
Mr. Owl assigns Franklin and his class the task of building go-carts.; Franklin and Snail play "knights" on a royal quest. Along the way, their friends join in on the fun.
78	13	"Franklin Sees the Big Picture / Franklin Figure Skates"	Bob Ardiel / John Van Bruggen	August 8, 2004
Franklin is teased for reading a "toddler" book.; Franklin learns to figure skate.
