= LuxAnimation =

Luxembourgish animation studio

LuxAnimation S.A.
- Final logo used from 2007 to 2014
- Type: Subsidiary
- Industry: Animation
- Founded: 2001; 25 years ago
- Founders: Lilian Eche; Aryane Payen
- Defunct: 2014; 12 years ago
- Fate: Folded into Dargaud
- Headquarters: Doncols, Luxembourg
- Products: Television programs; Feature films
- Parent: MoonScoop (2006–2014)
- Subsidiaries: Luxatelier
- Website: luxanimation.com (archived October 1, 2011)

LuxAnimation was a Luxembourgish animation studio based in Doncols, Luxembourg. The company was founded in 2001 by former Neuroplanet employees Lilian Eche and Ariane Payen. The company often partnered with other companies to produce animated programs and movies. In 2006, LuxAnimation was acquired by MoonScoop. In June 2010, LuxAnimation opened a department called Luxatelier, which was dedicated to audiovisual projects for cinema and television. In 2014, Dargaud acquired MoonScoop and all of its European operations.

== Television series ==
- Potatoes and Dragons
- Creepschool
- Robotboy (season 1)
- Iron Man: Armored Adventures
- Cosmic Cowboys
- Galactik Football (animation production, season 1)
- Delta State
- Skyland
- Franklin (season 6)
- Mikido: The Millennium Kids
- The Klumpies
- Little Nick
- Little Spirou
- The Large Family (season 1)
- Luke and Lucy
- Mikado
- Moby Dick and the Secret of Mu
- Di-Gata Defenders
- Babar and the Adventures of Badou
- Zip & Saxo
- S.O.S. Libélula

== Feature films ==
- Black Heaven (2010) (VFX)
- Bypass (2012) (VFX)
- Daddy, I'm a Zombie (2011)
- Dragon Hunters (2008)
- Franklin and the Turtle Lake Treasure (2006)
- Friends Forever (2009)
- Luke and Lucy: The Texas Rangers (2009)
- Max & Co. (2007)
- The Prodigies (2011)
- 9 (2009)
- Petit Potam (2001)
- Renart the Fox (2005)
- Renaissance (2006)
- Santa's Magic Crystal (2011)
- Tootuff The Movie (2011)
- The True Story of Puss 'n Boots (2009)
- Tristan & Isolde (2002)
- Trouble at Timpetill (2008)

== Video games ==
- Torrente 3: The Protector (2005, PS2 & PC) (cutscene animation)
- Blade Kitten (2010, PS3) (opening cutscene)

== Partnerships ==
- Cartoon Network
- France 2
- France 3
- Nelvana
- RAI
- TF1
- ZDF
- Telegael
- Disney
- and more
