= Carolyn Scott =

American art director

- Occupations: Art director Set decorator
- Years active: 1982–2004

Carolyn Scott is an American art director and set decorator. She won an Academy Award in the category Best Art Direction for the film The Madness of King George.

== Selected filmography ==
- The Madness of King George (1994)
- Back to School with Franklin (2003)
