= Richard Newman (actor) =

American actor

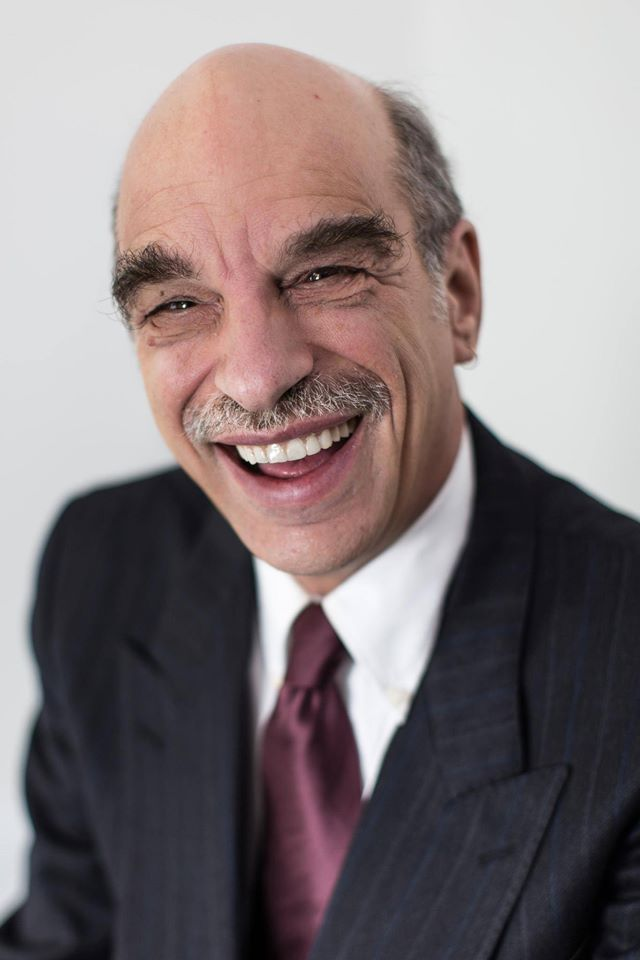
- Newman in 2015
- Occupation: Actor
- Years active: 1970–present
- Children: 1

Richard Newman is an American-born voice, film and television actor based in Canada.

== Career ==
Newman started his voice-over career in 1990 with Dragon Warrior. He has also had roles in Dragon Ball Z, RoboCop: Alpha Commando, Sherlock Holmes in the 22nd Century, and Spider-Man Unlimited as well as InuYasha, Oban Star Racers, MegaMan NT Warrior, and Bucky O'Hare and the Toad Wars. He is perhaps best known for his portrayals of Rhinox in Beast Wars: Transformers (Beasties in Canada) and M. Bison in the Street Fighter cartoon series. Newman also provided arch-villain Phaeton's voice in the animated television series Exosquad. Among his most recent roles are Bear Hugger (a Canadian boxer) in Punch-Out!!, and Cranky Doodle Donkey in My Little Pony: Friendship is Magic.

In the late 1990s, Newman (despite recording his lines in Vancouver) worked with the successful animation company Nelvana and lent his voice to some of their projects including Franklin, Donkey Kong Country and Pippi Longstocking.

Newman's credits also include theatre work. During the 2011 season of Vancouver's Bard on the Beach festival, he was acclaimed for his performance as Shylock in The Merchant of Venice and was nominated for a Jessie Award for "Outstanding Performance by an Actor in a Supporting Role, Large Theatre". His more recent work includes playing the title character in City Stage New West's 2012 production of King Lear, as well as playing Tosca in Neworld Theatre's production of Doost (Friend).

== Filmography ==
=== Film ===
List of voice performances in films
Year	Title	Role	Notes
1994	The NeverEnding Story III	Photographer	
1994	The Story of Christmas	Fathead, additional voices	
1997	The Fearless Four	Ackerman	English dub
1998	The Mighty Kong	Ship Captain	Direct-to-video
1998	The Animated Adventures of Tom Sawyer	Mayor	Direct-to-video
1999	Little Witch	John and Mr. Lond-Singer	Television film
2000	A Chinese Ghost Story: The Tsui Hark Animation	White Cloud / Reverend Bai Yun	English dub
2000	Help! I'm a Fish	Bus Driver	English dub
2000	Franklin and the Green Knight	Mr. Turtle	Television film
2001	A Christmas Adventure ...From a Book Called Wisely's Tales	Wisely Owl	Direct-to-video
2001	Franklin's Magic Christmas	Mr. Turtle; Great-Great Grandfather Turtle	Television film
2002	Inspector Gadget's Last Case: Claw's Revenge	Otto	Television film
2002	Dennis the Menace in Cruise Control	Jinks	Television film
2003	Ben Hur	Quintus Arrius	Direct-to-video
2003	Back to School with Franklin	Mr. Turtle	Television film
2003	Jester Till	Adalbert	
2004	Dragons: Fire and Ice	Thoron	Direct-to-video
2004	In Search of Santa	Narrator	Direct-to-video
2005	Ark	Umada	English dub
2005	Inuyasha the Movie: Swords of an Honorable Ruler	Tōtōsai	English dub
2005	Inspector Gadget's Biggest Caper Ever: The Case of the Giant Flying Lizard	Mayor Morty Markum	
2005	Dragons II: The Metal Ages	Thoron	Television film
2006	Franklin and the Turtle Lake Treasure	Mr. Turtle	
2006	Kong: Return to the Jungle	Mayor	
2007	Tom and Jerry: A Nutcracker Tale	Toymaker	Direct-to-video
2008	At Jesus' Side	Caiaphus, Merchant	Direct-to-video
2008	Sword of the Stranger	Zekkai	English dub
2017	Bob the Builder: Mega Machines	Two-Tonne	English dub
2018	Dragged Across Concrete	Feinbaum	
2021	Rock Dog 2: Rock Around the Park	Norbu	
2025	Light of the World	Fish Monger, Gaius, Town Guy	

=== Television ===
- Alienators: Evolution Continues – Additional Voices
- Animated Classic Showcase – Various characters
- Beast Wars – Rhinox, the Vok
- Beast Machines – Rhinox-Tankor
- Being Ian – Principal Bill McCammon
- Beyblade Burst Evolution - Raul Comas (ep. 21-51), Principal Shinoda
- Bibi and Tina - Russell von Redwell, Mill Farm Farmer
- Billy the Cat – Additional Voices
- Black Lagoon – Ratchman
- Bob the Builder – Two-Tonne (US Re-Dub)
- Boys Over Flowers – Yasukichi Makino
- Bucky O'Hare and the Toad Wars! – Toadborg, Wolf
- Camp Candy – Additional Voices
- Cardcaptors – Keroberos (true form)
- Class of the Titans – Chiron
- Conan the Adventurer – Set, Conn, Serpent Man, Blacksmith, Pict, Dong Hee, Captain Righello, Sekra (aka The Burning Skull), Grand Wizard, Demetrio, Spellbinder, Jhebbal Sag
- The Cramp Twins – Pony Protection Man
- Donkey Kong Country – Kong Fu
- Dragon Ball Z (The Ocean Group dub) – Captain Ginyu, Oolong (Second voice), Porunga, Banan, Strock, Additional Voices
- Dragon Booster – Dragon Jousting Announcer
- Dragon Tales – Mr. Knack Knack
- Dragon Warrior – Wizard Moore
- Edgar & Ellen – Mayor Knightleigh, Construction Worker, Alien 2
- Elemental Gelade – Kinnbart
- Exosquad – Phaeton
- Fat Dog Mendoza – Additional Voices
- Franklin – Mr. Turtle (Original US version)
- Franklin and Friends – Mr. Turtle (Original US version)
- Funky Fables – Narrator, Sebastian, Doctor, various voices
- G.I. Joe Extreme – Iron Klaw
- Gadget & the Gadgetinis – Additional Voices
- Gundam SEED – Lewis Halberton
- Gundam Wing – Chief Engineer Tsuborov
- Hamtaro – Laura's Grandfather
- He-Man and the Masters of the Universe – Rattlor, The Faceless One, Lord Dactys, Azdar, Additional Voices
- Hurricanes – Additional Voices
- Hello Carbot — Proud
- Hikaru no Go – Shigeo Morishita
- Inuyasha – Tōtōsai, Spider-Head Demon, Sōju Asano, Additional Voices
- Inuyasha: The Final Act – Tōtōsai, Wolf Demon Tribe ancestors, Bone demon's father, Additional Voices
- Johnny Test – Professor Slopsink
- Kong: The Animated Series – Howling Jack Crockett
- Let's Go Quintuplets – Grampa
- Level Up – Merchant
- Madeline – Additional Voices
- Make Way for Noddy – Mr. Plod (UK/US)
- Mary-Kate and Ashley in Action! – Additional Voices
- Master Keaton – Andrei Semionov
- Mega Man – Wood Man, Spark Mandrill
- MegaMan NT Warrior – Maysa/Commander Beef
- Mobile Suit Gundam 00 – Massoud Rachmadi
- Mobile Suit Gundam: Encounters in Space – Eiphar Synapse, Yuri Hasler
- Monster Rancher – Golem, Daton, Grandfather, Various
- ¡Mucha Lucha! – El Phantasmo
- My Little Pony: Equestria Girls - Better Together – Mr. Cranky Doodle
- My Little Pony: Equestria Girls – Holidays Unwrapped – Mr. Cranky Doodle
- My Little Pony: Friendship is Magic – Cranky Doodle Donkey
- NASCAR Racers – Jack Fassler, Spex
- The New Adventures of Kimba The White Lion – Old Dice
- Ninjago – General Cryptor, The Emperor of Ninjago
- Ōban Star-Racers – Rush, President McMillan, Creator
- Pac-Man and the Ghostly Adventures – Santa Pac
- Pippi Longstocking – Additional Voices
- Please Save My Earth – Lazlo
- Pocket Dragon Adventures – Additional Voices
- Powerpuff Girls Z – Dentist, Dead Shepherd
- Project A-ko: Grey Side/Blue Side – Maruten, Kotobuki's Secretary
- Pucca – Master Soo
- Raggs Kids Club Band – Dumpster the Cat
- Ranma ½ – Kimen, Manpukuji Priest, Zardon, Harumaki
- RoboCop: Alpha Commando – Additional Voices
- Rollbots – Kibi
- Ronin Warriors – Anubis/Kale, Dr. Koji/Yagiyu, Saranbou
- ReBoot – Daecon
- Ricky Sprocket: Showbiz Boy
- Roswell Conspiracies: Aliens, Myths and Legends – Chauf
- Saber Marionette J – Hikozaemon, Master Soemon Obiichi
- Shadow Raiders – Additional Voices
- Sherlock Holmes in the 22nd Century – Professor Moriarty
- Silverwing – Brutus, Throbb, Zephyr
- Skysurfer Strike Force – Five Eyes, Grenader
- Spider-Man Unlimited – High Evolutionary, J. Jonah Jameson, Dr. Brofsky, Additional Voices
- Street Fighter – M. Bison
- Superbook – Moses, Abraham, Namtar
- Super Duper Sumos – Wisdom San
- The Little Prince - Laudion (B 370 episodes 13-14, Planet of the Globies)
- The Vision of Escaflowne – Emperor Dornkirk, Gaou Fanel (Bandai Entertainment dub)
- Tico of the Seven Seas
- Transformers: Cybertron – Vector Prime
- Transformers: Energon – Megatron (Episode 14 only)
- Tobot — Tobot V
- Trollz – Additional Voices
- Trouble Chocolate - Mozzarella
- Video Girl Ai – Gokuraku Manager
- Video Power (The Power Team)
- Vor-Tech: Undercover Conversion Squad – Additional Voices
- X-Men: Evolution – Omega Red, Additional Voices
- Yashahime: Princess Half-Demon – Tōtōsai

=== Video games ===
List of voice performances in video games
Year	Title	Role	Notes
1998	Mobile Suit Gundam: Char's Counterattack	Eiphar Synapse / Yuri Hasler	
2000	Kessen	Jyosui Kuroda	English version
2004	InuYasha: The Secret of the Cursed Mask	Tōtōsai	English version
2004	Under the Skin	Master Itazura	English version
2005	Warhammer 40,000: Dawn of War - Winter Assault	Commissar / Priest	
2005	Mobile Suit Gundam SEED: Never Ending Tomorrow	Admiral Halberton	
2006	The Godfather: The Game	Virgil Sollozzo	
2009	Punch-Out!!	Bear Hugger	
2010	Ghost Recon	General Pettis, Lieutenant Dan	
2018	The Long Dark	Methuselah	
2018	Dragalia Lost	Gauld	English version
2020	Legends of Runeterra	Nautilus	

=== Staff work ===
- Big Meat Eater – Singer
- Funky Fables – Additional Director (Voice)
- Hooray for Sandbox Land – Producer (Goldrush Recording Company)
- Sugar and Spice – Additional Director (Voice)
