= Dominique Monféry =

Dominique Monféry is a French director, storyboard artist, illustrator, visual effects supervisor, and animator. He was born on 4 May 1965. He studied art at the prestigious Gobelins, l’École de l’image in Paris.

== Career ==
Monféry started his career at Disney in 1990 with DuckTales the Movie: Treasure of the Lost Lamp, working as an animator and animation supervisor. He was an animator of the character Claude Frollo from The Hunchback of Notre Dame. He also worked as an animation supervisor on Hercules (on the characters Titans and Cyclops), Tarzan (on the character Sabor), The Emperor's New Groove and The Jungle Book 2. Roy E. Disney hired Monféry to direct the animated short film Destino, after The Walt Disney Company returned to the project in 1999. It was Monféry's first film as a director. Monféry continued working at Disney until 2006 with The Fox and the Hound 2.

When the Walt Disney Feature Animation studio in Paris closed, Monféry co-created Welldone Films. His first feature film was the French-Canadian Franklin and the Turtle Lake Treasure in 2006, after which he directed the French-Italian feature film Eleanor's Secret, which was shown at the Rome Film Festival. Gaumont Animation was involved in producing both films, formerly known under the name Alphanim.

Monféry is also a graphic novel illustrator. His first work was Tin Lizzie, edited and distributed by Swiss Editions Paquet (2015). The story is based on the Ford Model T, nicknamed Tin Lizzie. The first part was released at the end of January 2015, and the second part was released in early July 2015. The story was written by Thierry Chafouin, who also worked with Disney as a storyboard artist.

Monféry also created the concept and animation of Au Fil de l' Eau (On Flying Water), an animated short musical film on the metaphor of life (little water drops). The film earned several distinctions throughout the year, some shared between Monféry and the producer and composer Julia Pajot, both for the concept and the original score. This film was released for a week in September 2015 in Los Angeles.

Originally working as a director on an animated film adaptation of Jack London's novel White Fang, Monféry is working on the screenplay.
