= Franklin the Turtle (books) =

Children's book

- Author: Paulette Bourgeois
- Illustrator: Brenda Clark
- Genre: Children's literature
- Publisher: Scholastic Corporation
- Published: 1986–present

Franklin the Turtle is a Canadian children's book franchise. All of the books in the original series were authored by Paulette Bourgeois and illustrated by Brenda Clark since 1986.

The book series has been adapted twice into television series: the 1997 animated series Franklin and its 2011 CGI-animated spin-off series, Franklin and Friends. The first books in the "Franklin and Friends" series were adapted by Harry Endrulat, while later books were adapted by Caitlin Drake Smith.

Voice actors like Noah Reid, Richard Newman, and Elizabeth Saunders played roles in the television show.

== Books ==
- Franklin in the Dark, illustrated by Brenda Clark, Kids Can Press (Toronto, Ontario, Canada), 08/11/1986.
- Hurry Up, Franklin, illustrated by Brenda Clark, Kids Can Press (Toronto, Ontario, Canada), Scholastic (New York, NY), 04/09/1989.
- Franklin Fibs, illustrated by Brenda Clark, Scholastic (New York, NY), 03/24/1991.
- Franklin Is Lost, illustrated by Brenda Clark, Scholastic (New York, NY), 02/02/1992.
- Franklin Is Bossy, illustrated by Brenda Clark, Scholastic (New York, NY), 05/17/1993.
- Franklin Is Messy, illustrated by Brenda Clark, Scholastic (New York, NY), 11/22/1994.
- Franklin Plays the Game, illustrated by Brenda Clark, Scholastic (New York, NY), 01/17/1995.
- Franklin Wants a Pet, illustrated by Brenda Clark, Scholastic (New York, NY), 03/14/1995.
- Franklin Goes to School, illustrated by Brenda Clark, Scholastic (New York, NY), 08/22/1995.
- Franklin's Blanket, illustrated by Brenda Clark, Scholastic (New York, NY), 11/07/1995.
- Franklin and the Tooth Fairy, illustrated by Brenda Clark, Kids Can Press (Toronto, Ontario, Canada), Scholastic (New York, NY), 02/06/1996.
- Franklin Has a Sleepover, illustrated by Brenda Clark, Kids Can Press (Toronto, Ontario, Canada), Scholastic (New York, NY), 04/09/1996.
- Franklin's Halloween, illustrated by Brenda Clark, Scholastic (New York, NY), 08/13/1996.
- Franklin's School Play, illustrated by Brenda Clark, Scholastic (New York, NY), 11/26/1996.
- Franklin's Bad Day, illustrated by Brenda Clark, Kids Can Press (Toronto, Ontario, Canada), Scholastic (New York, NY), 01/21/1997.
- Franklin Rides a Bike, illustrated by Brenda Clark, Scholastic (New York, NY), 03/18/1997.
- Franklin's New Friend, illustrated by Brenda Clark, Scholastic (New York, NY), 08/26/1997.
- Finders Keepers for Franklin, illustrated by Brenda Clark, Scholastic (New York, NY), 01/06/1998.
- Franklin and the Thunderstorm, illustrated by Brenda Clark, Scholastic (New York, NY), 03/10/1998.
- Franklin's Valentines, illustrated by Brenda Clark, Scholastic (New York, NY), 06/30/1998.
- Franklin's Secret Club, illustrated by Brenda Clark, Scholastic (New York, NY), 09/01/1998.
- Franklin's Christmas Gift, illustrated by Brenda Clark, Scholastic (New York, NY), 11/03/1998.
- Franklin's Class Trip, illustrated by Brenda Clark, Scholastic (New York, NY), 03/02/1999.
- Franklin's Neighbourhood, illustrated by Brenda Clark, Scholastic (New York, NY), 09/07/1999.
- Franklin Goes to the Hospital, illustrated by Brenda Clark, Scholastic (New York, NY), 03/21/2000.
- Franklin's Baby Sister, illustrated by Brenda Clark, Scholastic (New York, NY), 10/17/2000.
- Franklin and Harriet, illustrated by Brenda Clark, Kids can press (Toronto, Ontario, Canada), 02/27/2001.
- Franklin's Thanksgiving, illustrated by Brenda Clark, Scholastic (New York, NY), 10/16/2001.
- Franklin says ''I Love You'', illustrated by Brenda Clark, Kids Can Press (Toronto, Ontario, Canada), 04/02/2002.

=== With Sharon Jennings ===
- Franklin Says Sorry, illustrated by Brenda Clark, Scholastic (New York, NY), 1999
- Franklin and the Baby, illustrated by Brenda Clark, Scholastic (New York, NY), 1999
- Franklin's Canoe Trip, illustrated by Brenda Clark, Scholastic (New York, NY), 1999
- Franklin's Bicycle Helmet, illustrated by Brenda Clark, Scholastic (New York, NY), 2000
- Franklin Forgets, illustrated by Brenda Clark, Scholastic (New York, NY), 2000
- Franklin and the Baby-Sitter, illustrated by Brenda Clark, Scholastic (New York, NY), 2001
- Franklin Runs Away, illustrated by Brenda Clark, Scholastic (New York, NY), 2001
- Franklin and the Magic Show, illustrated by Brenda Clark, Scholastic (New York, NY), 2002
- Franklin and the Big Kid, illustrated by Brenda Clark, Scholastic (New York, NY), 2002
- Franklin and Otter's Visit, illustrated by Brenda Clark, Scholastic (New York, NY), 2002
- Franklin Stays Up, illustrated by Brenda Clark, Scholastic (New York, NY), 2003
- Franklin's Surprise, illustrated by Brenda Clark, Scholastic (New York, NY), 2003
- Franklin Makes a Deal, illustrated by Brenda Clark, Scholastic (New York, NY), 2003
- Franklin Snoops, illustrated by Brenda Clark, Scholastic (New York, NY), 2003
- Franklin Wants A Badge, illustrated by Brenda Clark, Scholastic (New York, NY), 2003
- Franklin's Reading Club, illustrated by Brenda Clark, Scholastic (New York, NY), 2003
- Franklin Forgives, illustrated by Brenda Clark, Scholastic (New York, NY), 2004
- Franklin the Detective, illustrated by Brenda Clark, Scholastic (New York, NY), 2004
- Franklin and the Contest, illustrated by Brenda Clark, Scholastic (New York, NY), 2/?/2004
- Franklin's Library Book, illustrated by Brenda Clark, Scholastic (New York, NY), 2005
- Franklin Celebrates, illustrated by Brenda Clark, Scholastic (New York, NY), 8/?/2005
- Franklin's Soap Box Derby, illustrated by Brenda Clark, Scholastic (New York, NY), 8/?/2006
- Franklin's Picnic, illustrated by Brenda Clark, Scholastic (New York, NY), 2006
- Franklin and the Duckling, illustrated by Brenda Clark, Scholastic (New York, NY), 8/?/2007
- Franklin and the Stopwatch, illustrated by Brenda Clark, Scholastic (New York, NY), 8/?/2007

== Collections ==
- Franklin's Classic Treasury (contains Franklin in the Dark, Franklin Fibs, Franklin Is Bossy, and Hurry Up, Franklin), illustrated by Brenda Clark, Scholastic (New York, NY), 1999.
- Franklin's Classic Treasury, Volume II (contains Franklin Is Lost, Franklin Wants a Pet, Franklin's Blanket, and Franklin and the Tooth Fairy), illustrated by Brenda Clark, Kids Can Press (Toronto, Ontario, Canada), 2000.
- Franklin's Friendship Treasury (contains Franklin Has a Sleepover, Franklin's Bad Day, Franklin's New Friend, and Franklin's Secret Club), illustrated by Brenda Clark, Kids Can Press (Toronto, Ontario, Canada), 2000.
- Franklin's School Treasury (contains Franklin Goes to School, Franklin's School Play, Franklin's Class Trip, and Franklin's Neighborhood), illustrated by Brenda Clark, Kids Can Press (Toronto, Ontario, Canada), 2001.
- Franklin's Holiday Treasury (contains Franklin's Halloween, Franklin's Valentines, Franklin's Christmas Gift, and Franklin's Thanksgiving), illustrated by Brenda Clark, Kids Can Press (Toronto, Ontario, Canada), 2002.
- Franklin's Family Treasury (contains Franklin Goes to the Hospital, Franklin's Baby Sister, Franklin and Harriet and Franklin Says I Love You), illustrated by Brenda Clark, Kids Can Press (Toronto, Ontario, Canada), 2003.
