= Brenda Clark =

Canadian illustrator (born 1955)

- Born: February 10, 1955 (age 71); Toronto, Ontario, Canada
- Education: Sheridan College
- Occupation: Illustrator

Brenda Clark (born February 10, 1955) is a Canadian illustrator, perhaps best known for her work on the Franklin the Turtle series of children's books.

She was born in Toronto and studied illustration at Sheridan College. She now lives in Port Hope.

Several books in the Franklin series have received awards from the Canadian Children's Book Centre. An animated television series Franklin based on the Franklin the Turtle books appeared on Canadian and American television. Canada Post issued a stamp featuring Franklin the Turtle in 2012. A second television series Franklin and Friends appeared in more than fifteen countries.

Clark was named to the Order of Canada in 2014.

== Selected work ==
- Sadie and the Snowman (1985), text by Allen Morgan
- Franklin in the Dark (1986), text by Paulette Bourgeois
- Big Sarah's Little Boots (1987), text by Paulette Bourgeois
- Little Fingerling (1989), text by Monica Hughes, received a book award from the Toronto chapter of the Imperial Order Daughters of the Empire
- My Dog: A Scrapbook of Drawings, Photos and Facts (1993), text by Marilyn Baillie
- Puddleman (1994), text by Ted Staunton
