= Elizabeth Saunders =

British-born Canadian actress

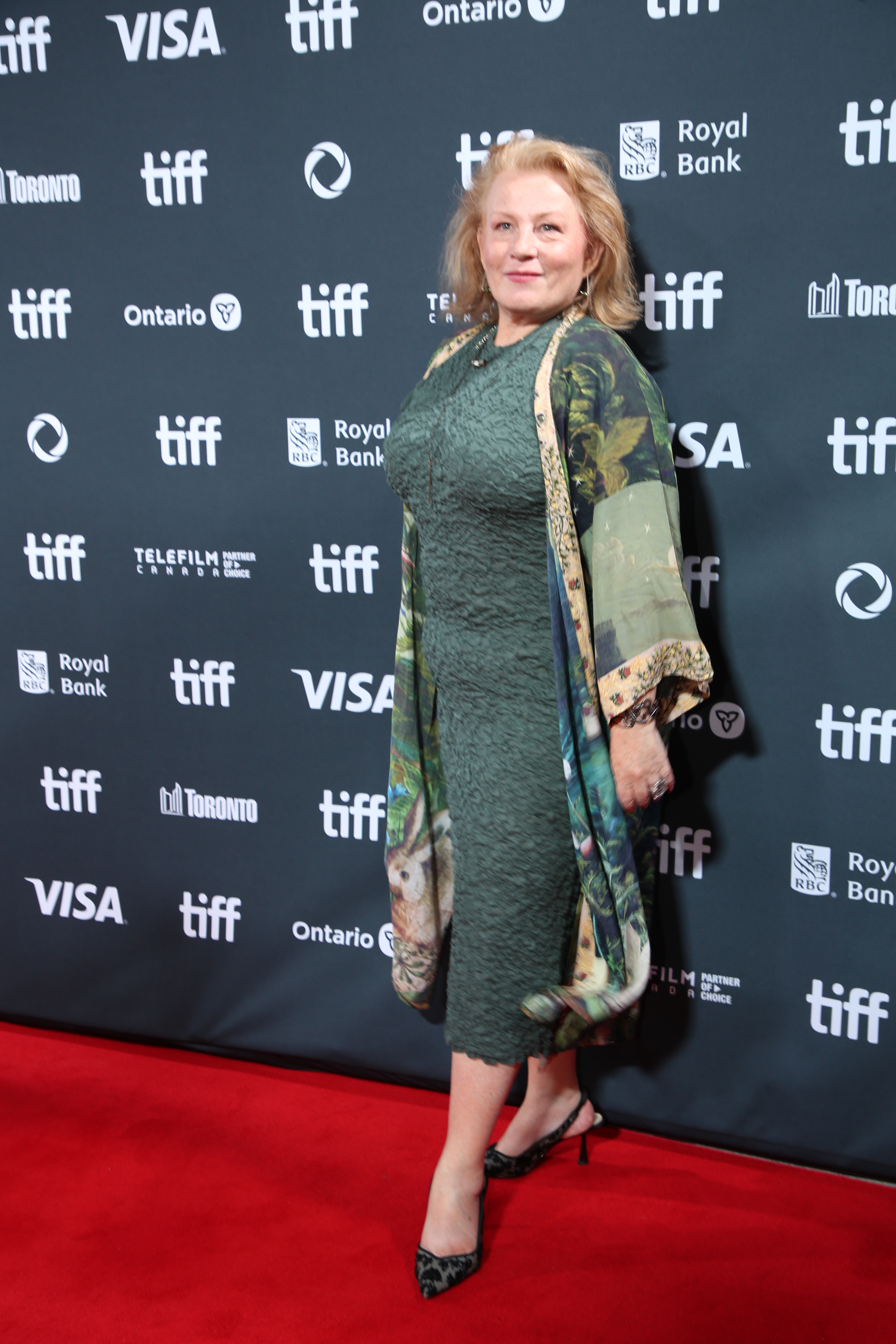
- Saunders in 2024
- Born: Elizabeth Brown
- Occupation: Actress
- Years active: 1986–present
- Spouse: Cliff Saunders (m. 1994)
- Children: 2

Elizabeth Saunders (née Brown) is a British-born Canadian actress. She is best known for playing Donna in the American television series From (2022–present).

== Career ==
Early in her career, she provided the voice of Mrs. Turtle in the Canadian animated series Franklin (1997–2004). She is credited for over 80 on-screen and voice acting roles, including The Shrouds (2024), The Boondock Saints (1999), Slings & Arrows (2005), It (2017), Alias Grace (2017), When Hope Calls (2019) and Clarice (2021). She is also the voice of Mailperson Mary on Henry's World. On stage, she worked for several seasons at the Shaw Festival where she appeared in This Happy Breed, Counsellor-At-Law, Too True To Be Good, among other productions.

=== Awards and recognition ===
She received a Saturn Award nomination for Best Supporting Actress for her role as Donna in From at the 52nd annual Saturn awards and Best Supporting Actress in a Drama Program or Series at the 8th Canadian Screen Awards in 2020 for her performance in Mary Kills People, and won an ACTRA Award in 2024 for her performance in the short film SmokeBreak.

== Filmography ==
=== Film ===
Year	Title	Role
1999	The Boondock Saints	Reporter
2017	It	Mrs. Starret
2019	Disappearance at Clifton Hill	Beverly Mole
2020	Girl	Mama
2021	All My Puny Sorrows	Marta
2022	Door Mouse	The Dame
2024	The Shrouds	Gray Foner
2024	40 Acres	Augusta Taylor

=== Television ===
Year(s)	Title	Role	Notes
1997–2004	Franklin	Mrs. Turtle	Voice role
2005	Slings & Arrows	Alana	
2013	Orphan Black	Dr. Anita Bower	Recurring role
2017	Alias Grace	Mrs. Humphrey	Miniseries
2019	When Hope Calls	Helen Bouchard	Recurring role
2019	Mary Kills People	Frances Thorp	
2021	Clarice	Bea Love	Recurring role
2021	The Hot Zone	Maureen Stevens	1 episode
2022–present	From	Donna Raines	Main role
