= Paulette Bourgeois =

Canadian writer

Paulette Bourgeois CM
- Born: July 20, 1951 (age 75); Winnipeg, Manitoba, Canada
- Children: Natalie and Gordon
- Writing career
- Genre: Children's literature
- Notable awards: Order of Canada [LL.D] [CAOT Order of Merit]
- Website: paulettebourgeois.ca

Paulette Bourgeois, CM (born July 20, 1951) is a Canadian writer best known for creating Franklin the Turtle, the character who appears in picture books illustrated by Toronto native Brenda Clark. The books have sold more than 60 million copies worldwide and have been translated into 38 languages. An animated television series, merchandise, DVDs and full-length films are based on the character.

== Education and early career ==
Paulette Bourgeois was born in Winnipeg, Manitoba, on July 20, 1951.

She studied occupational therapy at the University of Western Ontario, graduating with a Bachelor of Science degree in 1974. She later studied journalism at Carleton University. In 2009, she completed a Master of Fine Arts degree in creative writing at the University of British Columbia.

She was a psychiatric occupational therapist for three years before deciding to focus on her writing. Bourgeois worked as a reporter for the Ottawa Citizen and CBC Television. She became a freelance journalist in Washington, D.C., contributing pieces to Chatelaine, Canadian Living, Reader's Digest and Maclean's. Bourgeois returned to Toronto in 1983.

== Writing ==
After the birth of her first child, Natalie, Bourgeois decided to write a children's book inspired by the Season 7 episode of M*A*S*H entitled C*A*V*E, where Hawkeye Pierce admits that he is claustrophobic and refuses to go into a cave, "If I were a turtle I would be afraid of my own shell", he explained. Franklin in the Dark was illustrated by Brenda Clark and published in 1986.

Bourgeois is also the author of Changes in You and Me, books about adolescence, Oma's Quilt which was developed as a short film by the National Film Board of Canada, Big Sarah's Little Boots and more. She has also written dozens of non-fiction books for children, including the Amazing series, the In My Neighbourhood series, The Sun, and The Moon. Bourgeois has been a columnist for Homemaker's Magazine, written for Canadian Living, Chatelaine and Today's Parent. She provided the concept and initial research for "The Bee Talker" which aired on CBC TV's The Nature of Things. Bourgeois has written three episodes of the TV documentary series, Creepy Canada, and has just finished the script for a full-length feature film, Loving Mrs. Twiggy.

The Canadian Association of Occupational Therapists asked Bourgeois to write a picture book explaining the work of occupational therapists. You, Me and My OT was published in 2009. It tells the story of Emma, a feisty young girl with cerebral palsy who participates in everyday classroom occupations.

== Awards and honours ==
=== Honours ===
- 2003: Member of the Order of Canada, recognizing her children's writing and support for children's literacy.
- 2007: Honorary Doctor of Laws from the University of Western Ontario, awarded on June 15.
- 2009: Award of Merit from the Canadian Association of Occupational Therapists for writing You, Me and My OT, which introduces children to occupational therapy.

=== Book awards and nominations ===
- 1990: Information Book Award honour book for The Amazing Paper Book, illustrated by Linda Hendry.
- 1996: Information Book Award finalist for both Starting with Space: The Moon and Starting with Space: The Sun.
- 2002: Ruth Schwartz Children's Book Award for Oma's Quilt, shared with illustrator Stéphane Jorisch.
- 2002: Blue Spruce Award nominee for Oma's Quilt, illustrated by Stéphane Jorisch.
- 2010: Red Cedar Award shortlist for The Dirt on Dirt.
- 2022: IODE Jean Throop Book Award for Professor Goose Debunks Goldilocks and the Three Bears, illustrated by Alex Griffiths.

== Selected works ==
- On Your Mark, Get Set ...: All About the Olympics Then and Now (1987)
- The Amazing Apple Book (1987)
- The Amazing Paper Books (1989)
- Starting with Space: The Sun (1995)
- Starting with Space: The Moon (1995)
- Oma's Quilt (2001)
