= Big Girl (film) =

- Directed by: Renuka Jeyapalan
- Written by: Renuka Jeyapalan
- Produced by: Anneli Ekborn; Michael Gelfand
- Starring: Samantha Weinstein; Kris Holden-Ried; Patricia Fagan
- Release date: 2005
- Running time: 14 minutes
- Country: Canada
- Language: English

Big Girl is a 2005 Canadian short film, written and directed by Renuka Jeyapalan.

The film depicts a battle of wills between a young girl (Samantha Weinstein) and her mother's new boyfriend (Kris Holden-Ried).

It won the Toronto International Film Festival Award for Best Canadian Short Film at the 2005 Toronto International Film Festival, and was nominated for a Genie Award for Best Live Action Short Drama at the 27th Genie Awards. Weinstein won an ACTRA Award for Best Actress from the Toronto chapter, becoming the youngest actress ever to win that award.

It screened on CBC Television's Canadian Reflections in 2006.
