= Bryn McAuley =

Canadian actress

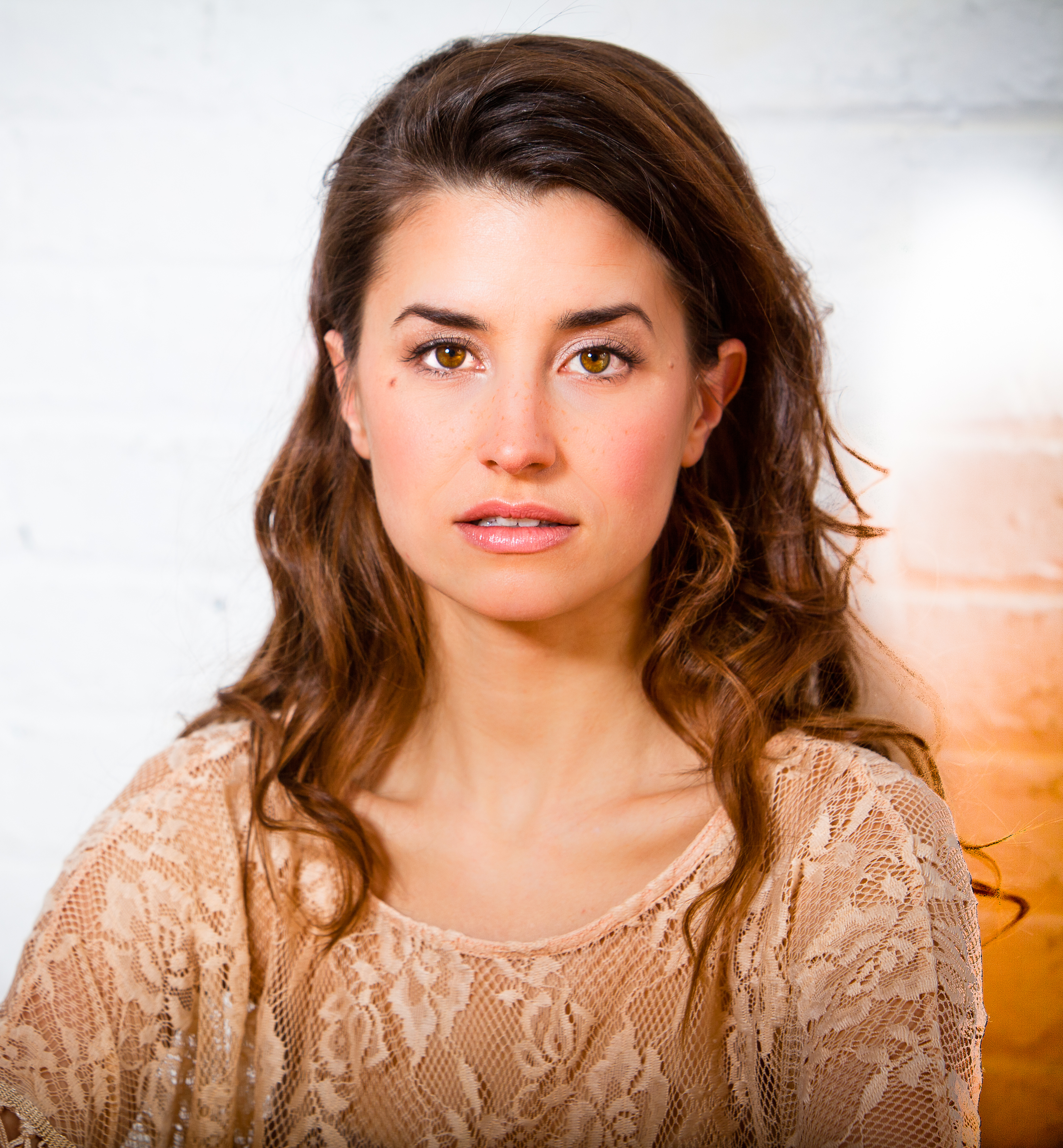
- McAuley in 2014
- Born: Toronto, Ontario, Canada
- Occupation: Actress
- Years active: 1997–present
- Website: https://brynmcauley.com/

Bryn McAuley is a Canadian actress. She is best known for playing Caillou on the television series of the same name, Anne Shirley on Anne of Green Gables: The Animated Series, Gina Lash in Angela Anaconda, Skye Blue in Carl Squared, Becky Lopez in George Shrinks, Harriet in Franklin, Laney Penn in Grojband, Suzi in Camp Lakebottom, Quills in Numb Chucks, Amy and Samey in Total Drama: Pahkitew Island, Taylor in Total Drama Presents: The Ridonculous Race, Mavis Dracula in Hotel Transylvania: The Series, Eleanor in The Day My Butt Went Psycho! and Bea in Top Wing.

== Early life ==
McAuley was born in Toronto to Marilyn McAuley, a casting director. She began acting as a child, initially onscreen in various Canadian feature films alongside fellow young Canadian actors Michael Cera and Alison Pill.

== Career ==
Her acting career began when she was invited to try out for some roles when she was four; she was accepted into an agency and began to land several roles. However, she established her role as a voice actor after landing the role of Caillou in 1997 when she was 7. She has since received several other prominent roles such as Gina Lash on Angela Anaconda, Becky Lopez on George Shrinks and Laney Penn on Grojband. She has stated that two of her favourite roles are Quills in Numb Chucks and twin cheerleaders Amy and Samey in Total Drama: Pahkitew Island.

In February 2013, McAuley performed in a hit play called Claire from the Bus, written and directed by Kjartan Hewitt.

McAuley voices Mavis in the animated fantasy television series Hotel Transylvania: The Series on Disney Channel.

At the 13th Canadian Screen Awards in 2025, she won the Best Performance in a Live Action Short Drama for Bibi's Dog Is Dead.

== Personal life ==
McAuley lives in Toronto. She graduated from Vaughan Road Academy alongside other performers like Drake and Sarah Gadon. In 2010, she co-founded the Young Emerging Actors Assembly, YEAA, with Eli Goree. YEAA is the youth committee at ACTRA Toronto, representing actors who play 17–30 in Toronto. McAuley went to Ryerson University (now Toronto Metropolitan University) from 2011 to 2015.

== Filmography ==
| Year | Title | Role | Notes |
|---|---|---|---|
| 1997–2000 | Caillou | Caillou (voice) (Season 1) | Lead Role |
| 1997 | Donkey Kong Country | Baby Kong (voice) | "Ape Foo Young" and "Baby Kong Blues" |
| 1998 | The Sleep Room | Marsha Farmer | |
| 1998 | Provocateur | Audrey Finn | |
| 1998 | Earthquake in New York | Carla Rykker | Credited as Bryan McAuley |
| 1998 | Fatal Affair | Daisy Meddox | |
| 1999 | What Katy Did | Joanna Carr | TV movie |
| 1999–2002 | Toad Patrol | Oyster (voice) | Series Regular |
| 1999–2002 | Angela Anaconda | Gina Lash (voice) | Supporting role |
| 2000 | For Better or for Worse | April Patterson (voice) | Recurring role |
| 2000 | Franklin and the Green Knight: The Movie | Harriet (voice) | Supporting Role, but uncredited for some reason |
| 2000–2001 | Anne of Green Gables: The Animated Series | Anne Shirley (voice) | Lead Role |
| 2000–2003 | George Shrinks | Becky Lopez (voice) | Recurring role |
| 2000–2012 | Franklin | Harriet (voice) | Series regular |
| 2001 | Franklin's Magic Christmas | Harriet (voice) | Lead role |
| 2002–2005 | Girlstuff/Boystuff | Hanna (voice) | Lead role |
| 2003 | Back to School with Franklin | Harriet (voice) | Lead role |
| 2003 | Medabots: Spirits | Erika Amazake (voice) Suzie (voice) | Main role Supporting role |
| 2003–2005 | The Save-Ums! | Elizabat (voice) | Replaced by younger sister Phoebe |
| 2005–2008 | Harry and His Bucket Full of Dinosaurs | Sam (voice) | Supporting role |
| 2005 | Interlude | Mutsuki Saegusa (voice) | Main role |
| 2005–2011 | Carl² | Skye Blue (voice) | Lead role |
| 2006 | Franklin and the Turtle Lake Treasure | Harriet (voice) | Supporting role |
| 2006–2008 | Zoé Kézako | | Season 1 |
| 2007–2009 | Charlie's Orchestra | | |
| 2008–2009 | Wunderkind Little Amadeus | Nannerl/Pumperl (voice) | Main role |
| 2009–2011 | Poppets Town | Patty (voice) | Main role |
| 2009 | Cyberchase | Petra the Hedgehopper (voice) | Episode: "Spellbound" |
| 2009 | 6teen | Kylie Smylie (voice) | Episode: "Kylie Smylie" |
| 2009 | Toot and Puddle | Lilly (voice) | 8 episodes |
| 2009 | Pearlie | Twinkle-Twinkle (voice) | |
| 2009–2010 | The Dating Guy | Celia/Shari/Mallory (voice) | Recurring role |
| 2010 | Aaron Stone | Carrie | Episodes: "Sparks and Damage Control" |
| 2010–2011 | Arthur | Capri de Vapida (voice) | Episodes: "Pet Projects" and "All the Rage" |
| 2011 | Justin Time | Princess (voice) | Episode: "Marcello's Meatballs" |
| 2011 | Almost Naked Animals | Cally Mari (voice) | Episode: "These Sleeps are Made for Walkin'" |
| 2011 | Against the Wall | Angie | Episode: "We Have a Cop in Trouble" |
| 2011–2013 | Crash Canyon | Roxy Wendall (voice) | Main role |
| 2011–2013 | Skatoony | Violet/Goldie Pops (voice) | Episodes: "Quizoo", "Stop the Pop" and "Pop Video" |
| 2012 | Stoked | Caroline (voice) | Episode: "Browatch" |
| 2012 | The Cat in the Hat Knows a Lot About That! | Princess Lottachoca (voice) | Episode: "The Last Chocolate" |
| 2012 | Murdoch Mysteries | Minnie Duggan | Episode: "Stroll on the Wild Side (Part 2)" |
| 2013 | Teenage Fairytale Dropouts | Golden Locks/Miss Muffett (voice) | Minor Role |
| 2013 | Oh No! It's an Alien Invasion | Dash (voice) | Guest role (3 episodes) |
| 2013 | Beyblade: Shogun Steel | Ren (voice) | |
| 2013 | Played | Marla | Episode: "Hitman" |
| 2013 | Mudpit | Serena/Siren (voice) | Episode: "Siren Song" |
| 2013–2015 | Grojband | Laney Penn, Larry Nepp, N'ORB (voice) | Lead role |
| 2013–2015 | The Day My Butt Went Psycho! | Eleanor Sterne (voice) | Lead role |
| 2013–2017 | Camp Lakebottom | Suzi (voice) | Series regular |
| 2014–2016 | Numb Chucks | Quills (voice) | Lead role |
| 2014 | Saving Hope | Leslie Crane | Guest star (Episode: "Broken Hearts") |
| 2014 | Jihad Giglo | Finoa | |
| 2014 | Exquisite | Paris | |
| 2014 | Total Drama: Pahkitew Island | Amy/Samey (voice) | Amy (4 episodes), Samey (5 episodes) |
| 2014 | Daisy, A Hen into the Wild | Young Willie/Chirpie (voice) | Lead role and supporting role |
| 2015 | Total Drama Presents: The Ridonculous Race | Taylor (voice) | Supporting role, 8 episodes |
| 2016 | Fangbone! | Cid (voice) | Supporting role, 5 episodes |
| 2016–2018 | Magiki | | Canadian dub |
| 2016–2017 | The Bagel and Becky Show | Argentina Brown (voice) | Supporting role |
| 2017–2020 | Hotel Transylvania: The Series | Mavis Dracula (voice) | Lead role |
| 2017–2020 | Top Wing | Bea, Shirley Squirrley (voice) | Lead role |
| 2018 | Inspector Gadget | Oracle of Delphi (voice) | Lead role |
| 2018–present | Daniel Tiger's Neighborhood | Teddy Platypus, Margaret Tiger (voice) | Supporting role |
| 2019 | Let's Go Luna! | Skye (voice) | Supporting role; 1 episode |
| 2019 | PAW Patrol | Ladybird (voice) | Supporting role; 4 episodes |
| 2019–2021 | Norman Picklestripes | Girl Gopher (voice) | Recurring role with Taylor Abrahamse as Boy Gopher, all episodes |
| 2020 | Remy & Boo | EB (voice) | Recurring role |
| 2021–present | Glowbies | Sally (voice) | Recurring role |
| 2024–2025 | Barney's World | Baby Bop (voice) | Main role |
| 2024 | Bibi's Dog Is Dead | Bibi | Short film; also writer and producer |
