= Samantha Weinstein =

Canadian actress (1995–2023)

- Weinstein at the Tribeca Film Festival in 2011
- Born: Samantha Gail Weinstein; March 20, 1995; Toronto, Ontario, Canada
- Died: May 14, 2023 (aged 28); Toronto, Ontario, Canada
- Occupation: Actress
- Years active: 2001–2023
- Notable work: Heather in Carrie; Audrey O'Hara in Jesus Henry Christ; Sloane Plunderman in D.N. Ace
- Spouse: Michael Knutson (m. 2022)

Samantha Gail Weinstein (March 20, 1995 – May 14, 2023) was a Canadian actress.

== Life and work ==
Weinstein was born in Toronto, Ontario on March 20, 1995 to Jewish parents, Jojo (née Tindall) and David Weinstein. She began her professional acting career at the age of six. By 2008, at the age of thirteen, she had appeared in the films Siblings in 2004, Big Girl in 2005, Ninth Street Chronicles in 2006, The Stone Angel in 2007, and Toronto Stories in 2008.

In February 2006, the 10-year-old Weinstein won the ACTRA Award for Outstanding Performance by a Female for her work in Big Girl, the youngest performer ever to win that award.

She was also a prolific voice actor, working in many cartoons right up until the last few weeks before her death, and was a singer and guitarist in the garage rock band Killer Virgins.

On October 29, 2022, Weinstein married Michael Knutson.

== Death ==
On May 14, 2023, Weinstein died at the age of 28, following a two-and-a-half year battle with ovarian cancer at the Princess Margaret Cancer Centre in Toronto, Ontario.

Prior to their death, Weinstein had come out as non-binary.

== Filmography ==
=== Film ===
Year	Title	Role	Notes
2004	Siblings	Danielle	
2005	Big Girl	Josephine	Short film
2006	Ninth Street Chronicles	Sara	Short film
2007	The Stone Angel	Child Hagar Currie	
2008	Toronto Stories	Cayle	
2008	The Rocker	Violet	Supporting role
2010	Babar and the Adventures of Badou	Chiku	Voice
2012	Jesus Henry Christ	Audrey O'Hara	Main role
2013	Carrie	Heather	Supporting role
2013	Haunter	Frances Nichols	
2015	Reign	Brooke	

=== Television ===
Year	Title	Role	Notes
2003	The Red Green Show	Sam the Brownie	Episode: "The Spelling Bee"
2004	72 Hours: True Crime	Lindsay	Episode: "The Game"
2004	XPM	Emma MacDonald	
2004	The Winning Season	Reeny Soshack	TV film
2005	Wild Card	Young Zoe Busiek	Episode: "A Whisper from Zoe's Sister"
2005	At the Hotel	Piper	Recurring role (4 episodes)
2005	Swarmed	Cindy Orsow	TV film
2005–2007	Gerald McBoing Boing	Janine	Voice, recurring role
2008	The Border	Katie Johanson	Episode: "Grave Concern"
2008	Super Why!	Swan Maiden, Thumbelina	Voice, 2 episodes
2008	Céline: Her Life Story	Margaret	TV film
2009	Maggie Hill	Emily Ransom	TV film
2009	Being Erica	Young Erica Strange	Episode: "Adultescence"
2010	Less Than Kind	Jen	Episode: "Coming Home"
2010–2012	Babar and the Adventures of Badou	Chiku	Voice, recurring role (26 episodes)
2012	Copper	Kayleigh O'Connor	Episode: "In the Hands of an Angry God"
2013	Darknet	Heather	Episode: "Darknet 3"
2014	My Big Big Friend	Nikki	Episode: "One and Only"
2016	The ZhuZhus	Mindy Gelato	Voice, recurring role
2017	Alias Grace	Effie	Recurring role (3 episodes)
2017	Angry Angel	Katie	Television film
2017	Wishfart	Finnuala	Voice, recurring role
2019–2020	D.N. Ace	Sloane Plunderman	Voice, main role
2019–2020	Kingdom Force	Jalopi	Voice
2020	Burden of Truth	Catherine	Episode: "Crisis of Faith"
2020, 2022	Let's Go Luna!	Gina, Harmony	Voice, episodes: "Arrievederci Aqua!", "Love and Harmony"
2021–2023	Dino Ranch	Clara Tinhorn	Voice
2023	Mittens & Pants	Ms. McRooster	Voice, between Seasons 1 through Season 2
2023	FLCL: Grunge	Akira, Saya	Voice, episode: "Shonari" "Orinoko"
2023	Riley Rocket	Starlet	Posthumous release; 2 episodes

== Awards and nominations ==
- ACTRA Award, won Outstanding Performance – Female, 2005, Big Girl.
- Cyprus International Film Festival, won Special Mention for an actress's leading role in a short film, 2007, Big Girl.
- Austin Film Festival, awarded Special Jury Mention for her performance, 2007, Ninth Street Chronicles.
