= Renuka Jeyapalan =

Canadian film and television director

- Education: University of Toronto (BSc)
- Alma mater: University of Toronto; Toronto Metropolitan University; Canadian Film Centre
- Occupations: Film director; television director; screenwriter
- Years active: 2005–present
- Known for: Big Girl, Stay the Night

Renuka Jeyapalan is a Canadian film director, television director, and screenwriter based in Toronto. She is best known for her award-winning short film Big Girl (2005), which won the Toronto International Film Festival Award for Best Canadian Short Film, and her feature film debut Stay the Night (2022), which premiered at South by Southwest. As a television director, she has worked on series including Murdoch Mysteries, Kim's Convenience, Workin' Moms, Ginny and Georgia, Sort Of, and Wayward.

== Early life and education ==
Jeyapalan is of Tamil and Indian descent. She earned an Honours Bachelor of Science degree in biochemistry from the University of Toronto, where she had initially planned to pursue a career in medicine following the path of many family members. While at university, she took a film studies class that sparked her interest in filmmaking.

After graduating, Jeyapalan enrolled in night school film production classes at Toronto Metropolitan University (formerly Ryerson University). She subsequently attended the Canadian Film Centre's Directors' Lab, an experience she has credited with changing her life. She also participated in the Women in the Director's Chair (WIDC) Story & Leadership program.

== Career ==
=== Short films ===
Jeyapalan's debut short film Big Girl (2005), made during her time at the Canadian Film Centre, premiered at the 2005 Toronto International Film Festival, where it won the Short Cuts Canada Award for Best Canadian Short Film. The 14-minute drama, which explores the relationship between a nine-year-old girl and her mother's new boyfriend, subsequently screened at over 35 film festivals worldwide, including the Berlin International Film Festival, Tribeca Film Festival, and San Francisco International Film Festival. The film was a shortlisted Genie Award finalist for Best Live Action Short Drama at the 27th Genie Awards.

Following Big Girl, Jeyapalan struggled for years to get her feature projects made while working as an assistant at a Bay Street investment bank, a job she intended to last six months but which extended to six years. During this period, she continued to write and directed the short films Arranged (2014) for TMN, Movie Central, and the Harold Greenberg Fund, and A Bicycle Lesson (2016). Her 2019 short Life Support, adapted from a Globe and Mail First Person column, premiered in the TIFF Short Cuts programme.

In 2010, Jeyapalan received the Kodak New Vision Mentorship Award from Women in Film and Television Toronto and was mentored by director Catherine Hardwicke (Twilight, Thirteen).

=== Television ===
Jeyapalan's agent encouraged her to consider television work, and she pitched a series inspired by her years on Bay Street to CBC, which earned a development deal. Although the project was not produced, it introduced her to CBC executives. She subsequently shadowed on Murdoch Mysteries and was given an episode to direct, launching her television directing career around 2016.

Since then, she has directed episodes of numerous Canadian and American television series, including Murdoch Mysteries, Kim's Convenience, Workin' Moms, Ginny and Georgia, Sort Of, Son of a Critch, North of North, Law & Order Toronto: Criminal Intent, and the Hulu series How to Die Alone starring Natasha Rothwell. She directed the pilots for Bell Media's Children Ruin Everything and CBC's Son of a Critch. In 2025, she directed episodes of the Netflix limited series Wayward, starring Mae Martin and Toni Collette.

Jeyapalan was nominated for Best Director in a Comedy Series at the 10th Canadian Screen Awards for directing the Sort Of episode "Sort Of A Party".

=== Feature films ===
Jeyapalan co-directed her first feature film, the 2017 thriller Ordinary Days, with Kris Booth and Jordan Canning.

Her solo feature directorial debut, Stay the Night, premiered at the South by Southwest Film Festival in March 2022. The romantic drama film, which she also wrote and produced, stars Andrea Bang and Joey Scarpellino as two strangers who form an unexpected connection over the course of one night in Toronto. The film was released theatrically in Canada on October 7, 2022, and received positive reviews, holding an 88% approval rating on Rotten Tomatoes. Stay the Night was nominated for Best Sound Editing and Best Sound Mixing at the 2023 Canadian Screen Awards.

== Filmography ==
=== Film ===
Year	Title	Role	Notes
2005	Big Girl	Director, writer	Short film
2014	Arranged	Director, writer	Short film
2016	A Bicycle Lesson	Director, writer	Short film
2017	Ordinary Days	Co-director	Co-directed with Kris Booth and Jordan Canning
2019	Life Support	Director	Short film
2022	Stay the Night	Director, writer, producer	

=== Television ===
Year	Title	Notes
2016–present	Murdoch Mysteries	
2018–2021	Kim's Convenience	
2019–2023	Workin' Moms	
2021	Ginny and Georgia	
2021–2022	Sort Of	CSA nomination for Best Direction, Comedy
2022	Children Ruin Everything	Pilot episode
2022–present	Son of a Critch	Pilot episode
2024	North of North	
2024	Law & Order Toronto: Criminal Intent	
2024	How to Die Alone	
2025	Wayward	
