= Juan Chioran =

Canadian actor (born 1963)

- Born: June 18, 1963 (age 63); Alberti, Argentina
- Occupation: Actor
- Years active: 1986–present

Juan Chioran (born June 18, 1963) is a Canadian actor.

== Career ==
=== Stage ===
Chioran is especially associated with the Stratford Shakespeare Festival where he is based in Stratford, Ontario, Canada. To date he has appeared in 18 seasons at the Festival, performing in comedies, Gilbert and Sullivan operattas,musicals and, of course, Shakespeare. Chioran appears in filmed performances of several Stratford productions, including two of Richard Monette's productions of Shakespeare's plays, which were performed and shot on-stage, produced by Norman Campbell of CBC Television, and released as television movies. In addition to non-televised stage roles, he played a Servant in The Taming of the Shrew (1988), and the Spanish Merchant in The Comedy of Errors, which were his earliest screen appearances.

=== Screen ===
Chioran has had numerous film and television roles. One of his earliest screen roles occurred in 1993, portraying Nicky, an art forger who gets caught up in a murder committed by his patron Eve (Roberta Bizeau), on the Canadian crime-fighting series Counterstrike in the episode, "French Twist." He played Laurie in the theatrical film The Perfect Son (2000). Chioran's television roles include Dr. Christian Vezza, the corrupt and criminal personal physician to billionaire gangster "Dale the Whale" in the 2002 Monk episode, "Mr. Monk Meets Dale the Whale." He played the role of Francobollo Garibaldi, the father of Raven-Symoné's character in the Disney Channel original television movie, The Cheetah Girls (2003).

More recently he appeared in the 2024 film Mother Father Sister Brother Frank as Frank.

=== Voice acting ===
Chioran is known for his voice acting roles, such as Lance Boil on Grossology (2006–2009), King Caradoc in Jane and the Dragon (2006), Barry Bullevardo in the animated series Iggy Arbuckle (2007), and Doji in Beyblade: Metal Fusion (the first 31 episodes, succeeded by Andrew Jackson).

In Totally Spies!, he voiced the uncredited role of Ice Cream Man in the 2006 episode "Evil Ice Cream Man Much?"

He was Snow Miser in the 2008 movie A Miser Brothers' Christmas, and Mr. Mansour in Miss BG. He voiced Nero the Animal Hero in Cyberchase (2010), Raimundo the Ringmaster on the CGI series PAW Patrol (2013), Art Wurst on Detentionaire (2014), and Venomous Drool in Fangbone! (2014 and 2016).

More recently, he voices Señor Tapir, a Mexican-born musical tapir who appears in Elinor Wonders Why (2020–present).

== Awards and nominations ==
Chioran won a Gemini Award for Best Performance in a Performing Arts Program or Series in 2000 for a televised showing of his portrayal of Count Dracula in Dracula: A Chamber Musical. He was nominated for a 2007 Joseph Jefferson Award for Actor in a Supporting Role in a Musical for The Three Musketeers at the Chicago Shakespeare Theater in Chicago, Illinois.

== Credits ==
=== Stratford Shakespeare Festival ===
Chioran has played the following roles at the Stratford Shakespeare Festival.

- The Adventures of Pinocchio (1986) by Carlo Collodi — Father (ep. 6, 14, 21, 29)
- The Mikado (1993) by Gilbert and Sullivan — Poo-Bah
- Man of La Mancha (1998) by Dale Wasserman — Don Quixote
- The Winter's Tale (1998) by William Shakespeare — Polixenes
- Dracula: A Chamber Musical (1999) — Count Dracula
- A Midsummer Night's Dream (1999) by William Shakespeare — Oberon
- As You Like It (2000) by William Shakespeare — Jaques
- Hamlet (2000) by William Shakespeare — Gravedigger
- All's Well That Ends Well (2008) by William Shakespeare — Parolles
- Bartholomew Fair (2009) by Ben Jonson — Zeal-of-the-land Busy
- The Three Sisters (2009) by Anton Chekhov — Solyony
- Evita (2010) by Arthur Laurents — Juan Perón
- Kiss Me, Kate (2010) based on a play by William Shakespeare — Fred Graham
- The Misanthrope (2011) by Molière — Philinte
- Twelfth Night (2011) by William Shakespeare — Fabian
- Much Ado About Nothing (2012) by William Shakespeare — Don Pedro
- Henry V (2012) by William Shakespeare — Montjoy

=== Filmography ===
==== Film ====
- 2000: The Perfect Son – Laurie
- 2000: Franklin and the Green Knight: The Movie (video) – Green Knight (voice)
- 2002: Rolie Polie Olie: The Great Defender of Fun (video) – Wally Jollie (voice)
- 2003: Rolie Polie Olie: The Baby Bot Chase (video) – Willy Jolly (voice)
- 2005: Heidi – Sebastian (voice)
- 2008: Finn on the Fly – Pablo Reyes
- 2011: Daisy, a Hen Into the Wild (English version) – Rooster (voice)
- 2017: Love's Labour's Lost – Don Adriano de Armado
- 2021: Around the World in 80 Days (English version) – Juan Frog de Leon / Bank Manager (voice)
- 2022: Sneakerella – Gustavo
- 2023: Mother of All Shows – Bradberry
- 2024: Mother Father Sister Brother Frank – Frank

==== Television ====
Juan Chioran television credits
Year	Title	Role	Notes	Ref.
1988	The Taming of the Shrew	Servant	TV movie. Richard Monette's Stratford production.	
1989	The Comedy of Errors	Spanish Merchant	TV movie. Richard Monette's Stratford production.	
1993	Counterstrike	Nicky	Episode: "French Twist"	
1993	Kung Fu: The Legend Continues	Hornet	1 episode	
1996	Traders	Unknown	1 episode	
1997	PSI Factor: Chronicles of the Paranormal	Prof. Frederick Roberts	1 episode	
1998	Blazing Dragons	Sir Loungelot (voice)	13 episodes	
1998	Universal Soldier III: Unfinished Business	Mel (voice)	TV movie	
1998	Naked City: A Killer Christmas	Miguel Sierra Blanca	TV movie	
1999–2000	Blaster's Universe	MEL (voice)	13 episodes	
2001	Relic Hunter	Ennio Anjou	1 episode	
2002	Earth: Final Conflict	Raleigh St. Claire	1 episode	
2002	Monk	Dr. Christian Vezza	Episode: "Mr. Monk Meets Dale the Whale" (S1.E4)	
2003	The Music Man	Salesman #3	TV movie	
2003	The Cheetah Girls	Francobollo	TV movie	
2002	Adventure Inc.	Josef Alvaro	1 episode	
2005, 2006	Time Warp Trio	King Nebuchadnezzar / Governor (voice)	2 episodes	
2005–2007	Harry and His Bucket Full of Dinosaurs	Sid / Mr. Bodine (voice)	18 episodes	
2006	Jane and the Dragon	King Caradoc (voice)	26 episodes	
2006	Skyland	Oslo (voice)	26 episodes	
2006–2008	Growing Up Creepie	Dr. Pappas (voice)	15 episodes	
2006–2008	Captain Flamingo	The Warrior Monkey / The Mirror (voice)	7 episodes	
2006–2009	Grossology	Lance Boil (voice)	12 episodes	
2007	Iggy Arbuckle	Barry Bullevardo (voice)	1 episode	
2008	Miss Spider's Sunny Patch Friends	Buzz / Wilver / Señor Moth (voice)	3 episodes	
2008	Roxy Hunter and the Horrific Halloween	Vlad	TV movie	
2008	A Miser Brothers' Christmas	Snow Miser / Flakes (voice)	TV movie	
2008	Erky Perky	Pablobo (voice)	1 episode	
2009	Beyblade: Metal Fusion	Doji (voice)	19 episodes	
2009–2011	Jimmy Two-Shoes	Rudolpho / Additional (voice)	10 episodes	
2009	Spliced	Aperitif (voice)	1 episode	
2010–2018	Arthur	Mr. Molina (voice)	3 episodes	
2011	The Adventures of Chuck and Friends	Sigmund (voice)	1 episode	
2013	PAW Patrol	Raimundo (voice)	4 episodes	
2014	Detentionaire	Art Wurst (voice)	8 episodes	
2014–2016	Fangbone!	Venomous Drool / One-Eye (voice)	4 episodes	
2015, 2017	Inspector Gadget	El Pacho / Jose Noe / MAD Henchman #2 (voice)	2 episodes	
2016	Reign	Archbishop Ridolfi	3 episodes	
2018	Wishfart	Gum King (voice)	1 episode	
2019–2020	D.N. Ace	Mendel (voice)	Regular cast (46 episodes)	
2020–2024	Elinor Wonders Why	Señor Tapir (voice)	22 episodes	
2021	An Ice Wine Christmas	Roberto	TV movie	
2021	A Christmas Proposal	Charles	TV movie	
2022	Undercover Holiday	Joaquin	TV movie	
