= Almost Got 'Im =

- Batman: The Animated Series episode
- Episode no.: Season 1 Episode 35
- Directed by: Eric Radomski
- Written by: Paul Dini
- Based on: Batman by Bob Kane (credited) and Bill Finger (uncredited)
- Original air date: November 10, 1992

Guest appearances
- Mark Hamill as the Joker; Arleen Sorkin as Harley Quinn; Richard Moll as Two-Face; Diane Pershing as Poison Ivy; Paul Williams as Penguin; Aron Kincaid as Killer Croc; Adrienne Barbeau as Catwoman

Episode chronology
← Previous "Terror in the Sky"	Next → "Birds of a Feather"

"Almost Got 'Im" is the forty-sixth episode of the Warner Bros. television program Batman: The Animated Series, which first aired on November 10, 1992, and was written by Paul Dini and directed by Eric Radomski. This episode features seven villains of Batman's rogues gallery, with five of them telling their respective stories of the times they each came closest to killing the Dark Knight (via a frame story), and the ending leading to a singular plot twist.

== Plot ==
While hiding out from the police, Joker, the Penguin, Two-Face, Poison Ivy, and Killer Croc gather at the criminals-only Stacked Deck Club. While passing time with a poker game, their conversation focuses on their mutual foe, Batman who recently nabbed the Mad Hatter. Eventually the subject leads each to an argument over who came the closest to killing the Caped Crusader, and at the Joker's behest each criminal details their own story about how they "almost got 'im".

Ivy recounts how she had unleashed poisonous gas on Halloween through thousands of pumpkins, only for Batman to thwart her plans by overcoming a trap. At first Poison Ivy managed to weaken Batman with the gas, and prepared to unmask him. However, Batman programs the Batmobile to chase her, and he used the opportunity to escape.

Two-Face recounts how he had staged a robbery at a mint for $2 million in two dollar bills, with the help of the Two-Ton Gang. He managed to take away Batman's utility belt and strap him onto a giant penny that he planned to catapult. However, Two-Face realized that Batman had stolen his coin and used it to break free, before apprehending him and his gang. He mentions that the police allowed Batman to keep the penny, confirming it to be the one displayed in the Batcave.

Croc describes facing off against Batman in a quarry and throwing a rock at him. The villains are unimpressed and move on.

Penguin recalls how he trained dangerous birds to attack Batman at an aviary, including a cassowary and poison-beaked hummingbirds. However, Batman soaks them in water with the aviary's sprinkler and injects himself with an antidote; Penguin was forced to flee as a direct result.

With his cohorts having told their stories, Joker recalls how he had been close to killing Batman the night before. After capturing Batman, Joker commandeered the set of a late-night talk show, holding the audience hostage. With help from his gang and Harley Quinn, Joker intended to kill Batman with an electric chair powered by the audience's laughter. Before Batman was subjected to a lethal dose of electricity, Catwoman broke into the studio, distracting Joker long enough for Batman to escape. Before she can keep Joker from fleeing the studio, Harley knocks Catwoman unconscious, with Joker instructing that she be hidden away.

With his story over, Joker wins the card game with four aces and a joker card. Croc questions Joker on what he did with Catwoman, to which he answers that she was taken to a cat food factory to be dealt with once he was finished at the club. To Joker's surprise, Croc attacks him, revealing himself to be Batman in disguise. As the other villains prepare to deal with him, Batman reveals that they were lured there as part of a sting operation organized by Gotham police, who were present in the club, in an attempt to find out Catwoman's whereabouts. While Commissioner Gordon and Detective Bullock arrest the group, Batman heads out to the factory to save Catwoman.

At the cat food cannery, Batman finds Harley with Catwoman, who is bound and gagged, while tied down to an assembly line, set to be ground up. Harley attempts to escape by turning on the conveyor belt, forcing Batman to choose between apprehending her and saving Catwoman. Batman, finding the machine's power switch, is able to capture Harley and rescue Catwoman. As Harley is arrested, Catwoman thanks Batman for the rescue, to which he states he owed her one for saving him. As Catwoman discusses their relationship and makes a pass at him but is distracted by police sirens, Batman pulls off his trademark disappearing act as he sets off to the rescue, leaving her to smile and mutter to herself "Hmm. Almost got 'im".

== Voice cast ==
- Kevin Conroy as Bruce Wayne / Batman
- Adrienne Barbeau as Selina Kyle / Catwoman
- Mark Hamill as The Joker
- Aron Kincaid as Wayne Jones / Killer Croc
- Richard Moll as Harvey Dent / Two-Face
- Diane Pershing as Pamela Isley / Poison Ivy
- Arleen Sorkin as Dr. Harleen Quinzel / Harley Quinn
- Paul Williams as Oswald Cobblepot / The Penguin

== Reception ==
The episode is widely regarded as among the series' best, and is ranked by fans on IMDb at 9.2. Ranking it the No. 2 best episodes of the series, IGN writes, "It's one of Paul Dini's cleverest episodes, and typifies the distilled iconography that the show did so well." Sandra Dozier calls the episode "charming" and praises it for showing "the origin story for the Bat Cave's giant penny."

D.N. Ace did a tribute to the episode in episode 39 called "Almost Aced 'Em".

Nostalgia Critic's review of It pays tribute to the episode.

== Home media ==
The episode features a commentary on the DVD and Blu-Ray release.
