= Dracula: A Chamber Musical =

- DVD cover, duplicating the original theatrical poster
- Music: Richard Ouzounian
- Lyrics: Marek Norman
- Book: Richard Ouzounian
- Basis: Bram Stoker's novel Dracula
- Productions: 1997 Halifax 1998 Halifax; 1999 Stratford; 2002 Beverly, MA 2003 Charlottetown, Prince Edward Island
- Awards: 2000 Gemini Award for Best Performance in a Performing Arts Program or Series – Juan Chioran

Dracula: A Chamber Musical is a 1997 Canadian musical adaptation of Bram Stoker's 1897 novel Dracula. The book and lyrics are by Richard Ouzounian and the music and orchestration are by Marek Norman. After premiering at the Neptune Theatre in Halifax, Nova Scotia, in 1997, Dracula in 1999 became the first Canadian musical to be staged at the Stratford Shakespeare Festival.

Dracula was a popular success, enjoying a six-month run. Ouzounian, who was head of creative arts programming for TVOntario, arranged for the musical to be filmed and broadcast in collaboration with CBC Television. The special earned Juan Chioran a 2000 Gemini Award for Best Performance in a Performing Arts Program or Series for his portrayal of the title role. Dracula has since been staged in regional theatres across the United States and Canada.

== Plot ==
=== Act I ===
Jonathan Harker, a young solicitor, travels from England to Transylvania to finalize a contract for Count Dracula to purchase Carfax Abbey. Harker is held captive in Dracula's castle for several weeks before escaping. He sends a telegram to his fiancée, Mina Murray, who joins him in Budapest, where they are married. Mina's friend Lucy Westenra accepts the marriage proposal of Harker's friend Dr Jack Seward, but their idyll is shattered by escaped lunatic Renfield, who warns that his master is coming for Lucy. She is soon seduced and bitten by Dracula, who has arrived in England and fallen in love with her. As Lucy weakens, Seward sends for his former teacher Abraham Van Helsing. Van Helsing diagnoses Lucy's illness as the attack of a nosferatu but is too late to save her. Lucy rises as a vampire and Van Helsing, Harker and Seward destroy her. Dracula vows to destroy Harker's love as Harker has destroyed his.

=== Act II ===
Dracula and Van Helsing vow to battle to the death. Mina reads Jonathan's account of his captivity and pledges to remain at his side regardless of what Dracula may do to separate them. However, Dracula seduces and attacks her, beginning her vampiric transformation. Harker swears to free her from Dracula's thrall. Van Helsing and Seward burn the Abbey but do not find Dracula. Renfield and Mina, each sympathizing with the other, promise each other to resist Dracula's evil influence but Dracula discovers them, snaps Renfield's neck for betraying him and flees to Transylvania with Mina. Van Helsing, Seward and Harker pursue them. Moments before sunrise the men corner and destroy Dracula, freeing Mina from the vampire's curse.

== Halifax 1997 cast ==
- Christopher Shyer - Count Dracula
- Brian Hill - Johnathon Harker
- Jayne Lewis - Mina Murray
- Cliff LeJeune - Renfield
- Elizabeth Beeler - Lucy Westenra
- Victor A. Young - Abraham Van Helsing
- Bruce Clayton - John Seward
- David Renton - Narrator

== Halifax 1998 cast ==
- Christopher Shyer - Count Dracula
- Roger Honeywell - Johnathon Harker
- June Crowley - Mina Murray
- Cliff LeJeune - Renfield
- Melissa Thomson - Lucy Westenra
- Gordon McLaren - Abraham Van Helsing
- Kevin Hicks - John Seward

== Stratford cast ==
- Juan Chioran - Count Dracula
- Roger Honeywell - Jonathan Harker
- June Crowley - Mina Murray
- Benedict Campbell - Renfield
- Amy Walsh - Lucy Westenra
- Michael Fletcher - Abraham Van Helsing
- Shawn Wright - Jack Seward

== Critical response ==
Horror scholar and critic David J. Skal cites Dracula: A Chamber Musical as "[p]erhaps the most satisfying stage treatment around the time of Dracula's hundredth birthday". He singles out Chioran for praise, calling his performance "an impressive amalgam of twentieth-century Draculas" and "menacing yet darkly romantic". Writing of a 2002 production mounted at the North Shore Music Theatre in Beverly, Massachusetts, Variety called the efforts of Ouzounian and Norman "flawed by sameness" but "thoroughly professional without being able to shake off the influence of Webber in 'Phantom' mode".
