= D.N. Ace =

- Genre: Adventure; Comedy; Science fiction; Action
- Created by: Matthew Wexler
- Developed by: John Derevlany; Andrew Harrison
- Directed by: Don Kim
- Voices of: Lyon Smith; Samantha Weinstein; Juan Chioran; Mpho Koaho; Taylor Abrahamse; David Berni; Luke Gordon; Andrew Jackson; Athena Karkanis; Ron Pardo; Robert Tinkler
- Theme music composer: Justin Forsley; Craig McConnell
- Composer: Scott Bucsis
- Country of origin: Canada
- Original language: English
- No. of seasons: 1
- No. of episodes: 40 (80 segments)

Production
- Executive producers: Scott Dyer; Athena Georgaklis; Matthew Wexler
- Producers: Laurie Handforth; Jeff Ramsden
- Running time: 22 minutes (11 minutes per segment)
- Production companies: Nelvana; Yeti Farm; Wexworks Media

Original release
- Network: Teletoon
- Release: July 6, 2019 – April 11, 2020

D.N. Ace is a Canadian animated television series created by Matthew Wexler and produced by Nelvana for Teletoon (now Cartoon Network). The series focuses on the life of Ace Ripley, a 12-year-old boy who gains the power to create DNA by using the Dscram to manipulate the Scrammers, alongside his lovable best friend Sloane Plunderman and an immortal squirrel named Mendel.

The show debuted on 6 July 2019, and ended its run on 11 April 2020. This was the final English-language Teletoon original series before the network rebranded as the new version of Cartoon Network Canada in 2023. 40 episodes were produced.

== Plot ==
The series follows the adventures of a curious, adventurous, mischievous, proudly nerdy 12-year-old boy named Ace Ripley who suddenly learns he holds an incredible ability to manipulate DNA by fusing the genes of a living thing with any other thing, to create something entirely new. The hero-in-the-making uses his newfound power to create ridiculous, amazing, and even terrifying mashed-up creatures, and tries to save his town from total chaos while trying to have the time of his life.

== Development ==
The series was announced on 14 November 2017, as a comedy adventure series created by Matthew Wexler and produced by Nelvana. Dentsu and OLM, Inc. served as consultants through production and represent the series in Japan. The show features service animation by Yeti Farm. Teletoon released the show's first trailer online on 21 June 2019.

== Characters ==
=== Main ===
- Ace Ripley (voiced by Lyon Smith) is the eponymous main character: a fun-loving 12-year-old boy who gains the power to manipulate DNA by using the Dscram, the DNA scrambling device that can create the Scrammers outside face of the wrath attack the mutants.
- Sloane Plunderman (voiced by Samantha Weinstein) is a teenage girl who is Ace's best friend and the sister of Huxley Plunderman.
- Mendel (voiced by Juan Chioran) is a squirrel who gained immortality and sentience after being exposed to the meteorite's energy. Afterwards, he swore to protect it and worked with Ace's ancestor Zebediah Ripley to create the DNA scrambler.
- Stuart "Stu" Tweeble (voiced by Mpho Koaho) is Ace's older stepbrother.
- Huxley Plunderman (voiced by Taylor Abrahamse) is the main antagonist. He is the C.E.O. of Plunderman Enterprises and the evil brother of Sloane. He is later downgraded to a recurring antagonist when he fires Juan and becomes a target to some of his attacks.

=== Other/Minor/Supporting ===
- Huxley's Scientists (voiced by Juan Chioran and David Berni) are engineers who work for Huxley to build Clashbots. All three wear red sunglasses, white coats, and black clothes.
- Bruiser is Huxley's main robot, who resembles Frankenstein's monster. He is later revealed to have a meteor fragment inside his body.
- Countess of Clash is a clash coach champion who lives on Clash Mountain with her giant robotic pig.
- Cynthia E. Overdrive/C.E.O. (voiced by Carolyn Scott) is a businesswoman who owns vending machine-type clash bots and speaks in a snotty Valley-girl accent.
- Cackles the Clown (voiced by Dan Chameroy) is a psychotic clash coach clown that terrorizes and destroys cities if his challengers won't accept his challenge.
- Rad Maverick is a surfer-type clash coach who lives in the sewers.
- Mendor is Mendel's twin brother who is opposite to his brother, funnier, adventurous, and greedy. He hides his evil twin brother act so he can trick Ace, Sloane and the Scrammers, to convince them he is more chilled and lovable.
- Clashsquatch is a former clashbot champion who gained sentience after being exposed to a fragment of the meteorite.
- Captain Nuevo is the recent Clash Coach champion.
- Warhol Muse (voiced by Jamie Watson) is an industrialist magician clash coach. In the episode "Now Museum Now You Don't", he temporarily gained the ability to transform others into paintings after touching a statue of Mendel that was imbued with a meteor fragment.
- Mr.Preston/Mr.P a.k.a. The Dump King (voiced by Mike Petersen) is a nice and kind garbage man who became evil after drinking the essence of the exiled Scarrathorn.
- Granny (voiced by Linda Kash) is Peggy's mom, Ace's grandma (and Stew's step-grandma), and Stew's dad mother-in-law. Originally a sweet grandmother before her arrival, she went on a gluten-free diet and became more reckless, destructive, obnoxious and crazier than her own grandson.
- Peggy Ripley is Ace's mother (and Stew's stepmom) who shares a resemblance to her son.
- Mr. Tweeble Stew's father (and Ace's stepdad) shares a resemblance to his son.
- Jerry Dayzee (voiced by Robert Tinkler) is a salesman who is barely respected.
- Butternut (voiced by James Hartnett) is a Christmas elf and friend of Ace.
- Tim is Butternut's reindeer friend, who can fly, create portals, and shoot lasers from his antlers.
- Raj Dynamite (voiced by Chai Valladares) is a clash coach who lost in a clash fight and disappeared for a year. He returns in the Clash of the Titans Tournament in an attempt to claim the champion belt, which holds a meteor fragment.
- Lucy, also called Little Lucy (voiced by Julie Lemieux) is a little girl who used to be Ace's biggest fan until Ace starts to miss out of the Clash Tournaments while he was busy with fighting Juan and his Juander-bots. Ace is aware of Lucy before fighting Juan, including having spare time to hang out with her until he forgot about her.
- Eel Mutant is a normal eel who was mutated by a Splinter and temporarily transformed into a draconic monster.
- Feral Plasma is a bacteria who was mutated after feeding on Splinters for centuries and transformed into a giant fiery form.

Clashbots/Clashers are small robots that are a popular brand for people and used in the Clash-a-torium to compete in tournaments and games.

- Common Clashbots
- Security-Bot
- Unicycle-Bot
- Party-Bot
- Ice Cream-Bot
- Lumber Jack-Bot
- Mega-Clasher/Dragon-Bot/Flap Dragon A robot dragon
- Servant-Bots
- Combiner-Bots Five Clashbots merge into one
- Combo-Bot A robot that was built to destroy the Scrammers
- Jolly-Bots
- Dragon-Bot 2/Flap Dragon 2 are a smaller version of the original Dragon-Bot
- Royal-Bot is Juan's little robot butler
- Juander-Bots
- Ninja Juander-Bots

=== Scrammers ===
Creatures that Ace creates with the Dscram using DNA mix of one living being and one object. All of them are loyal to their creator Ace and are about two feet tall.

- Multi Crab/Crabby (voiced by Luke Gordon) is a half crab, half multi-tool.
- Snout Hammer (voiced by Athena Karkanis) is half boar and half hammer.
- Hide-And-Sneak/Heidi (voiced by Evany Rosen) is half chameleon and half high top shoes.
- Digby/Digs (voiced by David Berni) is half groundhog and half Whoopee cushion.
- Cobra Tot (voiced by Taylor Abrahamse) is half snake and half baby doll.
- Boom Hound (voiced by John Gallagher) is half Bull Terrier and half boombox.
- Chopper (voiced by Josh Graham) is half beaver and half pine cone.
- Sharkuum is half shark and half vacuum cleaner.
- Cluck-Cluck-Boom/C.C. (voiced by Rob Tinkler) is half chicken half "Blueberry Pancake Cannon" Paint Ball Gun.
- Hose Fly is half moth and half fire extinguisher.
- Rachael 2 (voiced by Angela Maiorano-Thurston) is half raccoon and half Finger Puppet Rachael.
- The Great Bivalvo/val is half oyster and half fortune cookie.
- Cucarocka (voiced by Deven Mack) is half cockroach and half voice box.
- Chlorofile/Klo (voiced by John Hemphill) is half ivy and half nail file.
- Elasta-Kitty (voiced by Mark Little) is half cat and half rubberband.
- Snot Rocket (voiced by Rob Tinkler) is half snot germs and half toy tank.
- Head Wig (voiced by Pat Thornton) is half sloth and half helmet.
- Beef Plungington (voiced by Ron Pardo) is half cow and half plunger.
- Scarrathorn is half biologically mutated Venus flytrap and half body spray.
- Night Leaper (voiced by Andrew Jackson) is half grasshopper and half Action Figure.
- Polly Roger is half parrot and half GPS.
- Rhinestone (voiced by Kris Siddiqi) is half rhino and half diamond.
- Bear-B-Que (voiced by Chris Locke) is half bear and half BBQ charcoal grill cooker.
- Monkey Floss/Mo (voiced by Tony Nappo) is half monkey and half Cotton Candy.
- Sammy-Rye (voiced by Julius Cho) is half scorpion and half sandwich.
- Spark Bug (voiced by Allana Reoch) is half firefly and half headphones.
- Razzle Dazzle (voiced by Andrew Jackson) is half peacock and half glow stick.
- Sir Quills is half porcupine and half Knight's Helmet.
- OctoGraph is half octopus and half detective kit.
- Bucky BlowTorch (voiced by Gavin Fox) is half rabbit and half torch.
- Tooleo (voiced by George Buza) is half carpenter ant and half toolbox.
- Lazerine is half wolverine and half lazer.
- Arachnotist/Ari is half spider and half 3D Printer.
- Power Wash/PDubs (voiced by Deven Mack) is half mosquito and half sponge.
- Frostbite is half crocodile and half freezer.
- Solar Ray is half sunflower and half microwave.
- CompuFox is half fox and half laptop.

== Episodes ==
No.	Title	Directed by	Written by	Original release date
1	"Any Given Clashday"	Don Kim	Miles Smith	July 6, 2019
2	"Baby Snakes are a Pain" "Crabeo and Tooliette"	Don Kim	Miles Smith	July 13, 2019
3	"Adventures in Scrammersitting" "Countess of Clash"	Don Kim	Andrew Harrison Laurie Elliott	July 20, 2019
4	"Vending for Danger" "Ace Is Wild"	Don Kim	Miles Smith Andrew Harrison	July 27, 2019
5	"Dash 'N Splash" "Kicked to the Side"	Don Kim	Laurie Elliott	August 3, 2019
6	"Super Cool Creator Guy Day" "Hot Mess"	Don Kim	Evany Rosen Ben Joseph	August 10, 2019
7	"Scrapkins Clean!" "Trash Decisions"	Don Kim	Miles Smith Laurie Elliott	August 17, 2019
8	"Pure Clownage" "Terminacer"	Don Kim	Laurie Elliott Ben Joseph	August 24, 2019
9	"A Muggy Day" "Scrappetite For Destruction"	Don Kim	Shawn Kalb Miles Smith	August 31, 2019
10	"Pearls of Wisdom" "Clash of the Bands"	Don Kim	Evany Rosen Shawn Kalb	September 7, 2019
11	"The Scourge" "Sloane Plunderman, Junior Ghost Hunter"	Don Kim	Ben Joseph Laurie Elliott	September 14, 2019
12	"Squirrel Interrupted" "Clash Cops"	Don Kim	Shawn Kalb Ben Joseph	September 21, 2019
13	"Wingin' It" "The Pawshank Redemption"	Don Kim	Miles Smith Josh Gal	September 28, 2019
14	"The Ace and the Hound" "Sibling Riotry"	Don Kim	Laurie Elliott Miles Smith	October 5, 2019
15	"Snot Rocket" "Ace of Grades"	Don Kim	Shawn Kalb Josh Gal	October 12, 2019
16	"Tropic Blunder" "A New Dayzee"	Don Kim	Laurie Elliott Ben Joseph	October 19, 2019
17	"Wish Sewer Here" "Timber Tantrum"	Don Kim	Grant Sauvé Evany Rosen	October 26, 2019
18	"Underground Clashdown" "Ready Clasher One"	Don Kim	Miles Smith Shawn Kalb	November 2, 2019
19	"The Night Leaper" "Legend of the Clashsquatch"	Don Kim	Grant Sauvé Evany Rosen	November 9, 2019
20	"The New Guy" "Mendel Vs. Mendor"	Don Kim	Laurie Elliott Ben Joseph	November 16, 2019
21	"Del Contender"	Don Kim	Miles Smith	November 30, 2019
22	"The Art of Darkness" "The Explodies"	Don Kim	Shawn Kalb Ben Joseph	December 7, 2019
23	"Fortrash of Solitude" "Crooks and Grannies"	Don Kim	Laurie Elliott Evany Rosen	December 14, 2019
24	"Elf Destruction"	Don Kim	Andrew Harrison	December 21, 2019
25	"Squirreled Away" "Splinter is Coming"	Don Kim	Shawn Kalb Kyle Dooley	December 28, 2019
26	"The Clone Ranger" "The Chosen Juan"	Don Kim	Ben Joseph Laurie Elliott	January 4, 2020
27	"Sticks and Rhinestones" "Sauced and Found"	Don Kim	Evany Rosen Joel Buxton	January 11, 2020
28	"Carny Crush" "For Whom the BLT Tolls"	Don Kim	Craig Brown Miles Smith	January 18, 2020
29	"Night of the Clashing Dead" "Orange is the New Blackout"	Don Kim	Daniel Dillabough Shawn Kalb	January 25, 2020
30	"Splinterfell" "The Younger Games"	Don Kim	Ben Joseph Jeremy Winkels	February 1, 2020
31	"Last Auction Hero" "Fangirl Menace"	Don Kim	Miles Smith Kyle Dooley	February 8, 2020
32	"Clash to the Future" "All in the Scrammily"	Don Kim	Ian Macintyre Josh Gal	February 15, 2020
33	"Stu Detective" "Chillin' Like a Villain"	Don Kim	Joel Buxton Jeff Sager	February 22, 2020
34	"Now Museum, Now You Don't" "Where Have All the Powers Gone?"	Don Kim	Miles Smith Shawn Kalb	February 29, 2020
35	"Clothes Call" "Clashsquatch Lives!"	Don Kim	Rob Shapiro and Joel Buxton Mike D'Ascncenzo and Ben Joseph	March 7, 2020
36	"Small Business Sloane" "Plant Hardly Wait"	Don Kim	Laurie Elliott Ian Macintyre	March 14, 2020
37	"In the Heat of the Fight" "Supply and Demand"	Don Kim	Joel Buxton	March 21, 2020
38	"Caveheart" "Mommelganger"	Don Kim	Miles Smith Kyle Dooley	March 28, 2020
39	"A Drop in the Bucket" "Almost Aced 'Em"	Don Kim	Evany Rosen Miles Smith	April 4, 2020
Note: This is a tribute to the Batman: The Animated Series episode "Almost Got 'Im", where all the villains meet up and recount how they nearly defeated Batman.
40	"Juan for All and All for Juan"	Don Kim	Andrew Harrison	April 11, 2020
