= Norman Picklestripes =

American-Canadian-British television series

- Genre: Fantasy; Musical; Stop motion
- Directed by: Chris Sadler; Geoff Walker
- Voices of: Taylor Abrahamse; David Berni; Stacey DePass; Dwayne Hill; Tajja Isen; Deven Mack; Shayelin Martin; Christian Martyn; Alexander Marsh
- Theme music composer: Tim Burns
- Composers: Jeff Fisher; Jeffrey Zahn
- Countries of origin: United States; Canada; United Kingdom
- No. of seasons: 1
- No. of episodes: 23

Production
- Executive producers: Alex Rockwell; Judy Rothman Rofé; Phil Chalk
- Running time: 22 minutes
- Production company: Factory Animation

Original release
- Network: Universal Kids
- Release: July 27, 2019 – June 8, 2021

Norman Picklestripes is a stop-motion television series that aired from July 27, 2019 to June 8, 2021 on Universal Kids. The series is produced by an animation studio in Manchester, United Kingdom called Factory that received awards from BAFTA and Kidscreen. The series follows forest animals going through the comedic adventures of Plywood Forest's can-do handyman, Norm. The series also features Broadway–inspired songs. 23 episodes were produced.

Currently, the series is available for streaming on Globoplay in Brazil, as well as Stan in Australia; and is also available in 7 languages and has broadcast over 18 countries globally.

== Characters ==
=== Main ===
- Norman "Norm" Picklestripes (voiced by Dwayne Hill) is a green creature resembles a bear and a tiger with ears and stripes. He is the handyman in Plywood Forest. He can solve all sorts of problems. He is the son of Mother Nature.
- Bob (voiced by David Berni) is a neurotic, sweet and lovable purple porcupine who wears a red and yellow polka dotted bow and is Norm's oldest friend.
- Blanche (voiced by Stacey DePass) is a sassy and fashionable light pink bunny with dark magenta hair who likes everything to be clean in Plywood Forest.
- Marco (voiced by Alexander Marsh) is an 8-year old brown raccoon who wears a red shirt, and he is very active and full of energy. He thinks that he is good at jumping, running, and hip hop dancing, but is still learning how to do them right.
- Bixie (voiced by Bryn McAuley) is a black and white striped skunk who wears a flower on his head who advances at arts and crafts. She is also an owner and chief of her own salon, "Chop Chop Hair Salon".

=== Recurring ===
- The Possums are a blue possums trio. They alike hanging out with Norm in the Forest. The "lead possum" is named Blake and the other two possums are named Travis and Drew. Blake is voiced by Christian Martyn and Travis and Drew are respectively voiced by Dan Petronijevic and Robert Tinkler.
- Mother Nature (voiced by Judy Marshank) is a pink creature who is Norm's mom.
- Betsy (voiced by Shayelin Martin) is a striped skunk who is Bixie's sister.
- Juniper (voiced by Tajja Isen) is a green frog who wears a bonnet.
- Fred (voiced by Deven Mack) is a friendly purple spider.
- The Gophers are a pair of gophers who are Norm's assistants who like to chant "Magic" two or three times and say "One More Time" at the end of every episode to sing the episode's main song once again. Their names are not revealed but are respectively voiced by Taylor Abrahamse and Bryn McAuley.
- Carl (also voiced by David Berni) is a male weasel.
- Additional voices – Christian Potenza, Seán Cullen, Addison Holley, Mika Shimozato, Joe Cobden, Terry McGurrin, Ron Pardo, Lilly Bartlam, Cory Doran, Jacqueline Pillon, Jake Beale, Annick Obonsawin, Julie Lemieux, Jonathan Wilson, Christian Distefano, Scott McCord, Patrick McKenna, Novie Edwards, Kristin Fairlie, John Stocker, Joe Pingue, Hugh Duffy, Carolyn Hay, Andrew Sabiston, Jesse Camacho, Colin Doyle, Erin Pitt, Tyler James Nathan, Katie Griffin, Devan Cohen, Trek Buccino, Jenna Warren, Jacob Ewaniuk, Paul Braunstein, Aurora Browne, Dan Chameroy, Rebecca Husain, Drew Davis, Gage Munroe, Tyler Murree, Amos Crowley, Jordi Mand, Camden Angelis, Phil McCordic, Darren Frost, Stephanie Anne Mills, Meesha Contreras, Adrian Truss, Catherine Disher, Julie Sype and Jonah Wineburg

== Episodes ==
No. overall	No. in season	Title	U.S air date	Directed By
1	1	Mission Impossumable; Fur-Get About It	July 20, 2019	TBA
2	2	Construction Destruction; Smelly Business	July 27, 2019	TBA
3	3	Putt Putt Norm; Play It Again, Norm	July 27, 2019	TBA
4	4	Pizza Pickle; Forest Next Door	August 3, 2019	TBA
5	5	Slip Slide and Away; Go With the Glow	August 10, 2019	TBA
6	6	Party Planner Norm; Garbage Can-Do	August 17, 2019	TBA
7	7	Quill Attack; The Odd Couple	August 24, 2019	TBA
8	8	Bob Takes a Bow; Maple Schmaple	October 5, 2019	TBA
9	9	To Bee or Not to Bee; Playing Possum	October 12, 2019	TBA
10	10	Robo-Flop; Jumpin' Juniper	October 19, 2019	TBA
11	11	Happy Owlween; Love of Raisins	October 26, 2019	TBA
12	12	I Spy Pie; Blanche's Charm School	November 2, 2019	TBA
13	13	Don't Wake Grizzo; Tree TV	November 9, 2019	TBA
14	14	Para-Norm-al-Activity; The Best Forest Ever	June 1, 2021	TBA
15	15	Nanny Norm; The Treasure of Plywood Forest	June 1, 2021	TBA
16	16	False Alarm; The Pouf Pouf Hairdo	June 2, 2021	TBA
17	17	The First Earth Day	June 2, 2021	TBA
18	18	Born to Fly; The Floopsy Loopsy Dance	June 3, 2021	TBA
19	19	Blanche's Statue; Game Not On	June 4, 2021	TBA
20	20	Total Eclipse of the Moon; Telefrog	June 5, 2021	TBA
21	21	Me, Myself and Norm; Something Rottin'	June 6, 2021	TBA
22	22	Return to Blanche's Charm School; Honey, I Shrunk the Norm	June 7, 2021	TBA
23	23	Little Shop of Pollen; Norm's Magical Sneeze	June 8, 2021	TBA

== Broadcast ==
The series aired on Universal Kids in the United States and on Sky Kids in the United Kingdom. It also intentionally aired on channels such as Yle TV2 in Finland, Globoplay in Brazil, Stan in Australia, and Family Jr. in Canada.
