= Toronto Stories =

- Directed by: Sook-Yin Lee; Sudz Sutherland; David Weaver; Aaron Woodley
- Written by: Sook-Yin Lee; Sudz Sutherland; David Weaver; Aaron Woodley
- Produced by: Daniel Bekerman; Suzanne Cheriton; Jennifer Jonas; David Weaver; Tony Wosk
- Starring: Carly Pope; Gil Bellows; Sook-Yin Lee; K. C. Collins; Lisa Ray; Ricardo Hoyos; Ellora Patnaik
- Cinematography: Sammy Inayeh
- Edited by: Kathy Weinkauf
- Music by: E.C. Woodley
- Production company: New Real Films
- Distributed by: Christal Films
- Release dates: September 9, 2008 (Toronto International Film Festival); December 12, 2008
- Running time: 89 minutes
- Country: Canada
- Language: English

Toronto Stories is a 2008 Canadian anthology film. It has four segments that are bound together by a young boy, lost in an unknown city. After the prologue, the four segments are directed by different people: "Shoelaces" by Aaron Woodley, "The Brazilian" by Sook-Yin Lee, "Windows" by David "Sudz" Sutherland, and "Lost Boys" by David Weaver.

== Synopsis ==
Opening on the arrival of several overseas flights at Pearson International and the many diverse faces that populate the city’s landscape, a young boy, presumably of African descent, arrives at a customs desk unaccompanied and with no papers. He is taken into the custody of the immigration office, but when a back is turned he is drawn by curiosity into the throng of the airport. He then makes his way onto an express bus and into the city alone. An amber alert is issued signaling that a child has gone missing. That same day two children embark on a quest to find a reported monster living beneath the picturesque neighbourhood of Cabbagetown. Over the course of that day and into the night, they share a number of profound experiences involving love, death and their very first kiss. In Kensington Market a lonely woman and a young man who has never been in love come up against their fundamental differences in their search for understanding and connection. Alton and Doug reunite by chance on the streets of Toronto. These former partners in crime have to reevaluate their toxic relationship while staring down the barrel of a policeman's gun. A broken man fallen from grace and now inhabiting the streets and alleys around Union Station spots the lost boy, but when he approaches the authorities his mental illness causes the credibility of his discovery to be questioned.

== Cast ==
- Carly Pope ... Roshanna
- Gil Bellows ... Henry
- Sook-Yin Lee ... Willia
- K. C. Collins ... Alton Morris
- Lisa Ray ... Beth
- Ricardo Hoyos ... Jacob
- Ingrid Hart ... Chantal
- Samantha Weinstein ... Cayle
- Tygh Runyan ... Boris
- Toka Murphy ... Boy
- Olivia Palenstein ... Jacob's Mother
- Cameron Kennedy ... Zach
- Frank Moore ... Stevenson
- Mike McPhaden ... Father
- Michael Rhoades ... Inspector Kane
- Judy Sinclair ... Shelagh
- Joris Jarsky ... Doug Shannon
- Shauna MacDonald ... Lowry
- Daniel Park ... Asian Man
- Ellora Patnaik ... Caroline
- Elva Mai Hoover ... Dog Walker Lady
- Louise Naubert ... Eastern European Lady
- Maxwell McCabe-Lokos ... Eddi
- Richard Leacock ... Police officer Bell
- Stephen R. Hart ... Greely
- Carly Street ... Immigration Officer
- Ajit Zacharias ... Indian Man
- Julian Richings ... Leather Jacket
- James Lafazanos ... Night Manager
- Gene Mack ... Perry

== Release ==
Toronto Stories premiered at the Toronto International Film Festival (TIFF). It then went on to screen at the Possible Worlds Film Festival and the Kingston Canadian Film Festival. It was released in select theatres on December 12, 2008.

== Reception ==
Toronto Stories was panned by most critics. Variety, reviewing the film after its September 2008 premiere at TIFF, called it a "complete zero" that represented the nadir of the "omnibus city film concept"; they acknowledged the "major Canadian talent behind and in front of the camera" but said the film "manages to leave no memorable moments over the span of four wan short pieces about Torontonians in search of a city". After its limited Canadian release three months later, Bruce DeMara of the Toronto Star was much more positive, giving it three stars out of 4; DeMara, acknowledging he was an "unabashed city booster", said "cinephiles looking for the next generation of directors to follow in the footsteps of James Cameron, David Cronenberg and Norman Jewison may find it in this cadre of filmmakers." DeMara called Gil Bellows's performance a tour-de-force and said the "vignettes make Toronto look very good indeed, by turns accessible and mysterious, livably bourgeois in some places, raw and gritty in others, hip and modern, but with a sense of history." E.C. Woodley's music score was given special praise by DeMara, who wrote that the score "deserves special mention for its orchestral manoeuvres, by turns lively, languid and moody, evoking a sense of place in a city whose diversity makes it so difficult to define." Now called it a "plodding, uninspired collection of four short films — each written and directed by a well-regarded local filmmaker — that never rise above mildly engaging, are often just plain lousy and fail to use the city in any creative or interesting way." Eye Weekly gave it three stars out of 5, saying it was "disappointing that the results are so inconsistent, with none of the contributions matching their creators’ best efforts in the past. Nor, despite all its proud displays of local colour, does it present Hogtown as memorably as such other recent Toronto-centric indie pics as Monkey Warfare, Sabah or In Between Days."
