= Ordinary Days (film) =

- Directed by: Jordan Canning; Kris Booth; Renuka Jeyapalan
- Written by: Ramona Barckert
- Produced by: Ramona Barckert; Glenn Cockburn; Bryce Mitchell; Brian Robertson
- Starring: Jacqueline Byers; Richard Clarkin; Torri Higginson; Michael Xavier
- Cinematography: Michael Robert McLaughlin
- Edited by: Aren Hansen
- Music by: Keegan Jessamy; Bryce Mitchell
- Production companies: Relay Station; Seedaylight
- Release date: September 17, 2017 (AIFF)
- Running time: 82 minutes
- Country: Canada
- Language: English

Ordinary Days is a 2017 Canadian dramatic thriller film. Directed by Kris Booth, Renuka Jeyapalan and Jordan Canning, the film centres on the mysterious disappearance of Cara Cook (Jacqueline Byers), telling the story from three different perspectives.

Canning directs the first segment, which centres on Cara's parents Rich (Richard Clarkin) and Marie (Torri Higginson); Booth directs the second segment centring on Jonathan Brightbill (Michael Xavier), the police officer investigating Cara's disappearance; Jeyapalan directs the third, which reveals the story from Cara's own perspective. The cast also includes Joris Jarsky, Jefferson Brown and Daniel Kash.

The film was written and produced by Ramona Barckert, and commenced production in October 2016. It premiered in September 2017 at the Atlantic Film Festival
