= The Stanley Dynamic =

Canadian children's sitcom

- The Stanley Dynamic logo
- Genre: Sitcom
- Created by: Ken Cuperus
- Written by: Ken Cuperus
- Directed by: David Winning; Steve Wright
- Starring: Charles Vandervaart; Madison Ferguson; Kate Hewlett; Michael Barbuto
- Voices of: Taylor Abrahamse
- Theme music composer: Ian LeFeuvre
- Composer: Ian LeFeuvre
- Country of origin: Canada
- Original language: English
- No. of seasons: 2
- No. of episodes: 52

Production
- Producers: Matt Kippen; Cole Bastedo
- Production locations: Toronto, Ontario, Canada
- Animator: 9 Story Media Group
- Editor: Jeff Geisel
- Camera setup: Multi-camera
- Production companies: Amaze Film + Television; Nelvana; YTV Originals

Original release
- Network: YTV
- Release: March 19, 2015 – April 20, 2016

The Stanley Dynamic is a Canadian live-action/animated sitcom that premiered on YTV on March 19, 2015. The series stars Charles Vandervaart, Taylor Abrahamse, Madison Ferguson, Kate Hewlett, and Michael Barbuto. The show was nominated for a Canadian Screen Award for Best Writing in a Children's or Youth Program or Series. It was also a finalist at the 2016 Cynopsis Kids imagination Awards for Best New Series and won honorable mention in two categories.

== Premise ==
The series revolves around Larry and his animated twin brother Luke as they make their way through high school, as well as the rest of the Stanley family, including Lori, Luke and Larry's genius little sister; Lane, their cartoonist father; and Lisa, their caterer mother.

== Characters ==
=== Main ===
- Lawrence “Larry” Stanley II (portrayed by Charles Vandervaart) is the live-action older twin brother of Luke Stanley and older brother to Lori Stanley. He's a member of the school football team, an attention seeker, and is shown to not understand many things, especially sarcasm and irony. He was named after his grandfather although he despises his full name.
- Luke Stanley (voiced by Taylor Abrahamse) is the animated younger twin brother of Larry Stanley and older brother to Lori Stanley. He's the only animated character in the family, though this is rarely acknowledged by the others. He enjoys LARP-ing (Live-Action Role Playing), and is shown to be bad at sports. He's able to stretch his limbs and is very flexible, though it's painful to do so. He's also able to change his clothes quickly simply by spinning quickly.
- Lori Stanley (Madison Ferguson) is the genius little sister of Luke and Larry Stanley. She's shown to be the smartest of the family. She's passionate for entomology, and loves to take advantage of her two older brothers.
- Lisa Stanley (Kate Hewlett) is the mother of Luke, Larry, and Lori Stanley, as well as a caterer at the Brockdale Community Centre.
- Lane Stanley (Michael Barbuto) is the father of Luke, Larry, and Lori Stanley, as well as a cartoonist.

=== Recurring ===
- Pamela Fontaine (Josette Jorge) is the administrator of the Brockdale Community Centre. who has a sense of humor to the others of the brockadale community center, in "The Stanley Hypnotist" She was hypnotized by Luke using his powers of Hypnosis to act like a Chicken.
- Doop (Bill Turnbull) is the caretaker of the Brockdale Community Centre.
- Chelsea (Chelsea Clark) is the love interest of Luke and Larry. (season 1)
- Darnell (Isaiah Lee) is Larry's friend on the football team.
- Summer Dewhurst (Eliana Jones) is Luke and Larry's friend and neighbor who's the athletic director at the Brockdale Community Centre.
- Lawrence Stanley I (Michael Gross) is the grandfather of Luke, Larry, and Lori Stanley, and Lisa Stanley's father. Larry is named after him.
- Morgan Watson (Natalie Ganzhorn) is a schoolmate of Luke and Larry.
- Ronnie Van Helsing (Graeme Jokic) is a schoolmate of Luke and Larry.
- Mina (Tamina Pollack-Paris) is Darnell's sister who has a crush on Larry. (season 2)

=== Guest appearances ===
- David Hewlett as astronaut Glenn Cooper (Note: Surname incorrectly given as "Parker" in reference.)
- Alan Thicke as himself
- Jaleel White as Principal Webber
- Munro Chambers as Rupert
- Neil Crone as Officer Ben
- Charlie Storwick as herself

== Episodes ==
=== Season 1 ===
No. overall	No. in season	Title	Directed by	Written by	Original release date
1	1	"Pilot"	Steve Wright	Ken Cuperus	March 19, 2015
The Stanley family adjusts as Luke and Larry struggle to make friends when they start attending high school, Lori faces challenges when she starts private school, Lisa starts a job as a caterer, and Lane comes up with comic strip ideas.
2	2	"The Stanley Feud"	Steve Wright	Ken Cuperus	March 26, 2015
A feud sparks between the Stanley brothers after Larry starts hanging out with a new friend all the time. Meanwhile, Lisa hires a tutor for herself after being unable to help her daughter with her homework.
3	3	"The Stanley Business"	Steve Wright	Ken Cuperus	April 2, 2015
Luke and Larry compete to help their mother with her catering job in order to spend time with Chelsea. Meanwhile, Lori becomes Lane's partner in his comic strip business.
4	4	"The Stanley Games"	Steve Wright	Ken Cuperus	April 9, 2015
Lane organizes a game night for the Stanley family. When the rest of the family has last-minute obligations, they have trouble cancelling.
5	5	"The Stanley Luck"	Steve Wright	Ken Cuperus	April 16, 2015
Lisa sells Larry's lucky shirt to Chelsea and he's hit with a bout of bad luck, but he's too embarrassed to ask for it back. Meanwhile, Lori helps Doop build up the courage to ask Pam for a raise and Luke has fun with his new suit of armor.
6	6	"The Stanley Heist"	Steve Wright	Ken Cuperus	April 23, 2015
Luke accidentally breaks a sculpture up for auction at The Brock's art auction. While trying to fix it, he glues himself to a painting to avoid being discovered and is sold. Lane and Lori have to plan a heist to steal back Luke. Meanwhile, Lisa invites Chelsea over to the Stanley home to help prepare food for an event, and Larry tries to show her how cool he is.
7	7	"The Stanley Date Night"	Steve Wright	Cole Bastido	April 30, 2015
While Lane and Lisa enjoy their first romantic night out in ages, Luke and Larry juggle babysitting Lori with attending Chelsea's party.
8	8	"The Stanley Sick Day"	Steve Wright	Ken Cuperus	May 7, 2015
Luke and Larry have to teach classes at the Brock after all of the staff gets food poisoning. Meanwhile, Lori takes care of Lane and Lisa after they get food poisoning.
9	9	"The Stanley Catchphrase"	Adam Weissman	Ken Cuperus	May 14, 2015
Lane overhears Larry using a catchphrase Darnell made up and Lane uses it in his comic, leading Darnell to believe Larry stole it on purpose. Meanwhile, Luke tries to get rid of Lunch Lady Lizanka, and Lisa battles a food truck that moves into the Brock.
10	10	"The Stanley All-Nighter"	Adam Weissman	Ken Cuperus	May 21, 2015
The Stanley family has an important photo shoot. However, trouble ensues when Larry spends all night helping Lane with an important comic strip, Lisa helps Lori with her school project all night, and Luke plays an all-night game with his friends and Doop.
11	11	"The Stanley Grades"	Adam Weissman	Ken Cuperus	October 5, 2015
Luke, Larry, and Lori get their report cards. Larry gets very high grades, leading him to believe he's a genius, and joins the chess club where he plays against a champion chess player. Luke gets the same grades as Lane had gotten, leading Lane to believe Luke should follow him in his footsteps and trains him as a cartoonist. Meanwhile, Lori's grades show she's failing gym, leading Lisa to enroll her in a fitness class, where the fitness trainer starts to hound Lisa.
12	12	"The Stanley Neighbours"	Steve Wright	Ken Cuperus	October 12, 2015
Lisa tries to befriend the Stanleys' new neighbours, but her own family presents obstacles. Meanwhile, Larry tries to one-up new girl Summer in basketball.
13	13	"The Stanley Houseguest"	Steve Wright	Ken Cuperus	October 19, 2015
Lisa invites a homeless Doop to stay with the Stanleys, but he quickly wears out his welcome. Meanwhile, Larry and Summer compete to see who can hold on to a longboard without letting go first.
14	20	"The Stanley Spirit"	David Winning	Ken Cuperus	October 26, 2015
Doop and Pam offer ghost tours at the Brock. Luke and Ronnie are eager to witness ghosts, while Larry and Morgan set out to prove that it's all a scam.
15	15	"The Stanley Science"	Steve Wright	Ken Cuperus	November 2, 2015
Larry and Lori have a showdown at an annual science expo. Meanwhile, Luke tries to land the job of school mascot.
16	18	"The Stanley Grandpa"	David Winning	Ken Cuperus	November 9, 2015
The children are overjoyed when their typically strict grandfather Bill arrives with a new outlook on life, but after overhearing a conversation between him and Lisa, they believe he is hiding a terrible secret.
17	16	"The Stanley Student"	Steve Wright	Ken Cuperus	November 16, 2015
A mix-up at Lori's elite private school forces her to attend her brothers' public school, much to their dismay. Meanwhile, Lane befriends the neighborhood mailman.
18	17	"The Stanley Superhero"	David Winning	Ken Cuperus	November 23, 2015
Luke becomes a costumed superhero and uses his stretchy body to help students in need. This arouses jealousy in Larry, who creates his own superhero persona.
19	14	"The Stanley Crime"	Steve Wright	Ken Cuperus	November 30, 2015
Police-safety day is held, resulting in each member of the Stanley family landing behind bars.
20	26	"The Stanley Christmas"	Steve Wright	Ken Cuperus	December 7, 2015
Luke tries out to be Santa's elf at the Brock Christmas party. Meanwhile, Summer and Larry compete to see who can sell the most Christmas trees, and Lori coaches Lisa, Lane, and Doop on their Christmas caroling.
21	23	"The Stanley Cook-Off"	Steve Wright	Ken Cuperus	March 16, 2016
Lisa enters a charity cook-off, only to face Larry in a culinary showdown in the finals. Meanwhile, Morgan puts Luke through secret experiments.
22	19	"The Stanley Dodger"	David Winning	Ken Cuperus	March 23, 2016
Luke tries to prove his athletic ability by organizing a dodgeball team.
23	24	"The Stanley Honour"	Steve Wright	Ken Cuperus	March 30, 2016
When a renaissance fair is held, Larry must defend Summer's honor, and Luke and Ronnie battle to determine which of them is the real Robin Hood.
24	21	"The Stanley Hypnotist"	Steve Wright	Ken Cuperus	April 6, 2016
Luke accidentally hypnotizes Lane into believing he's Larry. Meanwhile, Doop goes undercover as a high school student.
25	22	"The Stanley Detective"	Steve Wright	Ken Cuperus	April 13, 2016
Larry helps Summer search for her favorite bracelet. Meanwhile, Luke masquerades as famed detective Sher-Luke Holmes.
26	25	"The Stanley Wild Weekend"	Jonathan A. Rosenbaum	Ken Cuperus	April 20, 2016
The boys and Bill go camping in the wilderness, but get lost in the woods. Meanwhile, Lisa and Lori are terrified by a scary movie.
