= Joris Jarsky =

Canadian actor (born 1974)

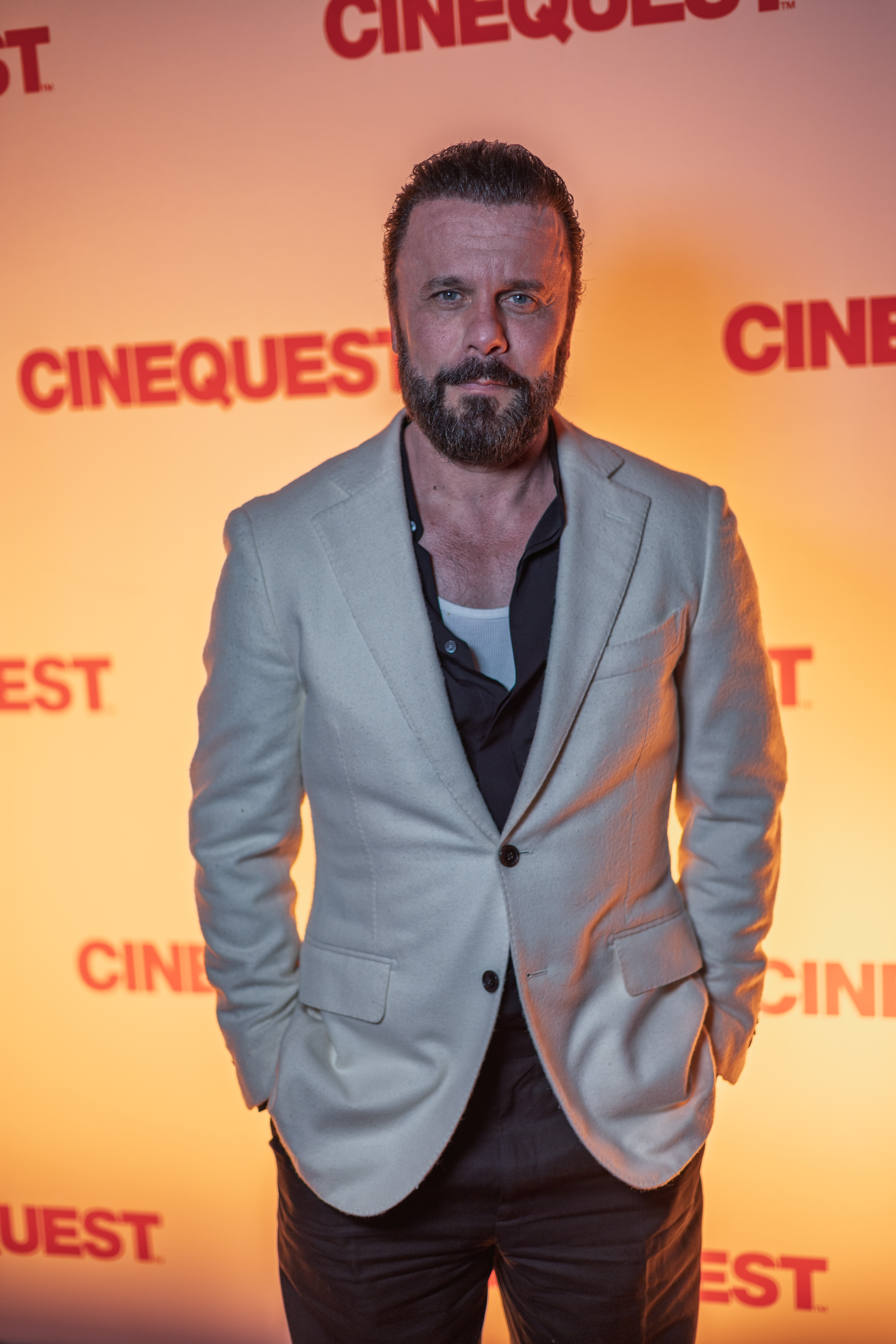
- Jarsky at the Cinequest Film Festival 2026
- Born: December 3, 1974 (age 51); Toronto, Ontario, Canada
- Other name: Joris Jorsky
- Occupations: Stage actor Film actor Television actor
- Years active: 2000-present

Joris Jarsky (born December 3, 1974) is a Canadian stage, film, and television actor who has received recognition for his versatility.

== Career ==
Jarsky is a graduate of the National Theatre School of Canada. Upon graduation, he was cast in Tarragon Theatre’s production of "The Awakening" for which he was nominated for a Dora Award. Since then he has acted in over 70 film and television productions and worked across the globe. His films have played at festivals all over the world including the opening night of the Cannes Film Festival. In 2009 Jarsky had 3 films in the Toronto International Film Festival, one of which, Toronto Stories, garnered him an ACTRA Award nomination. He created, wrote, produced, and starred in the pilot The Joseph Michael Joseph Show, which was picked up by 11Television Entertainment, a division of 3Arts Entertainment.

In 2016, Jarsky was nominated for a Canadian Screen Award for his performance in the Incendo film First Response. He has appeared as major recurring characters in the series Wynonna Earp and The Art of More, starred alongside Kim Coates in the hit miniseries Bad Blood, and guest starred on The Good Doctor. Jarsky recently starred in Ordinary Days and Birdland, two films that drew high praise on the festival circuit across North America. Current projects include guest star spots in CBC's Murdoch Mysteries and CTV’s Carter, as well as the recurring role of Basil Tate in the Netflix sci-fi drama October Faction.

== Early life ==
Jarsky was born in Toronto, Ontario, Canada. He became Ontario Gymnastics Champion at the age of 14. He attended the Etobicoke School of the Arts, and the National Theatre School of Canada.

== Career ==
After graduating the National Theatre School in 1999, he was cast in the play The Awakening and received a Dora Award nomination for 'Outstanding Performance by a Male'. Jarsky was also nominated for a 2009 Actra Award (Best performance by a Male) for his role as a troubled young man in "Toronto Stories" .

In 2008 three different films in which he appeared, Toronto Stories, The Green Door, and Blindness all screened at the 2008 Toronto International Film Festival. He had lead roles in Toronto Stories and The Green Door.

== Selected filmography ==
- Nuremberg (2000) - Soldier #2
- Hendrix (2000) - Jack Bruce
- The Caveman's Valentine (2001) - Boy Toy / Andy (as Joris Jorsky)
- Largo Winch (2001) - Caleb Dunlop (uncredited)
- One Eyed King (2001) - Scratchy
- Vampire High (2001–2002) - Marty Strickland
- Bliss (2002) - Jeremy
- Savage Messiah (2002) - Paula's Husband
- No Good Deed (2002) - Rudy Jones (uncredited)
- Mutant X (2003) - McTeague
- Foolproof (2003) - Rob
- Blessing (2003) - Chris
- Thoughtcrimes (2003) - Alan Matthews
- Doc (2004) - Bog Dog
- Show Me Yours (2004) - Colin
- The Limit (2004) - Brian
- The Eleventh Hour (2004–2005) - Geoff Powell / Nick Garwood
- Tilt (2005) - Luke
- Murder in the Hamptons (2005) - Carl Masella
- Shania: A Life in Eight Albums (2005) - J.P.
- Covert One: The Hades Factor (2006) - Tom Fancher
- 11 Cameras (2006) - Richard
- The Dead Zone (2006)
- Stargate: Atlantis (2007) - Herick
- Would Be Kings (2008) - Marvin
- Blindness (2008) - Hooligan
- The Incredible Hulk (2008) - Soldier #1
- Green Door (2008) - Rob
- Toronto Stories (2008) - Doug Shannon
- Turbo Dogs (2008–2011) - Strut (voice)
- Saw V (2008) - Seth Baxter
- Totally Spies! The Movie (2009) - Fabu (voice, English version)
- Survival of the Dead (2009) - Chuck
- The Boondock Saints II: All Saints Day (2009) - Lloyd
- Murdoch Mysteries (2009–2019) - Bertie Smothers / Jarius Kerr / Leopold Romanow
- Citizen Gangster (2011) - War Veteran
- Foxfire: Confessions of a Girl Gang (2012) - Construction Worker #1 (uncredited)
- Two Hands to Mouth (2012) - Andrew
- Empire of Dirt (2013) - Neil
- Numb Chucks (2014–2016) - Woodchuck Morris (voice)
- PAW Patrol (2016–present) - Mailman (voice)
- Ordinary Days (2017) - Ward Anderton
- Bad Blood (2017–2018) - Sal Montagna
- The Good Doctor (2018) - Sergey Tirayan
- Cupcake & Dino: General Services (2018–2019) - Peetree Gluck the Third (voice)
- Rule of 3 (2019)
- The Little Things (2021) - Detective Sergeant Rogers
- God's Country (2022) - Nathan Cody
- Youngblood (2025) - Lucas Turco
