= Joey Scarpellino =

Canadian actor

Joe Scarpellino (born on May 31, 1994) is an actor from Quebec.

== Background ==
Scarpellino grew up in Saint-Jean-sur-Richelieu. His dad is from Connecticut, while his mom is Québécoise.

== Career ==
After 4 years studying drama arts at La Bulle college, he got his first role on TV in the ICI Radio-Canada Télé show The Parent Family.

In 2011 and 2012, he was selected person of the year by the TV show KARV, l'anti.gala.

In 2022 he had his first major leading role in a feature film, as Carter in Renuka Jeyapalan's romantic drama film Stay the Night.

== See also ==
- Canadian television
