= Jacques Davidts =

Belgian-Canadian screenwriter

Jacques Davidts is a Canadian film and television screenwriter. He is best known as the writer of Polytechnique (2009), for which he won a Genie Award for Best Original Screenplay at the 30th Genie Awards in 2010.

He was born in Liège, Belgium, and raised in Saint-Eustache, Quebec. He has also been a writer for the Ici Radio-Canada Télé series The Parent Family.
