= Richard Ouzounian =

Canadian journalist (born 1950)

Richard Ouzounian (born March 8, 1950) is a Canadian journalist and theatre artist. He was a theatre critic for the Toronto Star and the Canadian theatre correspondent for Variety.

== Early life, family and education ==
Ouzounian was born in New York City. He is of Scotch-Irish descent, and he was adopted by an Armenian-Italian-Finnish family.

Ouzounian was educated at Regis High School, and then in 1970 received his B.A. in English Literature from Fordham University. He completed his M.A. studies in Theatre and Creative Writing at the University of British Columbia in 1972.

== Career ==
Ouzounian has worked in the world of the performing arts and arts journalism for over 50 years.

=== Journalism ===
His journalism work has been seen in many major Canadian publications and is an in-demand public speaker. Starting in 2000, he was a theatre critic for the Toronto Star, Canada’s largest daily newspaper. He also wrote celebrity profiles and travel stories.

In the summer of 2003, McArthur & Company published Are You Trying to Seduce Me, Miss Turner?, a collection of the celebrity interviews he had conducted since joining the Toronto Star. He filed his final review for the Star in December 2015.

From 2002–13, Ouzounian was also in charge of reporting on and reviewing the Canadian theatre scene for Variety. In 2006, Toronto Life referred to him as "the city's most influential critic".

=== Theatre credits ===
For over five decades, Ouzounian has written, directed, or acted in over 300 productions, served as Artistic Director of five major Canadian theatres (Festival Lennoxville, Young People's Theatre, Royal Manitoba Theatre Centre, Canadian Stage Company and Neptune Theatre), been an Associate Director of the Stratford Festival of Canada for four seasons, and worked as Harold Prince's assistant on the original Toronto production of The Phantom of the Opera.

Since retiring from The Star in 2015, his directing credits have included Napoleon (New York Musical Festival and Shaw Media Group, Seoul), Darling of the Day and Candide (Talk Is Free Theatre), Carrie: the Musical (Hart House Theatre), Atlantis (Sheridan College)and the concert productions of "Follies", "A Little Night Music" and "Into the Woods" (Royal Conservatory of Music).

Original musical theatre credits, written with his longtime collaborator Marek Norman, include:

- Dracula: A Chamber Musical: (Book/Lyrics): After a world premiere in Halifax's Neptune Theatre in October, 1998, a major production (directed by Ouzounian) played to record houses at the Stratford Festival for six months after its June 1999 opening. It was later televised for international sale, broadcast on CBC-TV and TVOntario and won a Gemini Award for its leading actor, Juan Chioran. It received its American premiere at the North Shore Music Theatre in Beverly, Massachusetts in October 2002, was seen at the Charlottetown Festival in the summer of 2003 and was recently revived by INNERChamber (Stratford) in October, 2017.
- Emily (based on the Emily of New Moon trilogy by Lucy Maud Montgomery): (Book/Lyrics) Debuted in 1999 at Charlottetown Festival of Prince Edward Island, and returned for a second season in 2000. A new revised version of the show was produced by Talk Is Free Theatre, Barrie, Ontario in May 2006, directed by Ouzounian. "Emily" was also mounted by Gateway Theatre, Richmond, British Columbia, in December 2006 and was revived in Barrie in November 2007. Recent productions have included its U.S. premiere at the Bluff City Theatre in Hannibal, Missouri (June, 2017).
- Larry's Party (based on the novel by Carol Shields): (Book/Lyrics) Commissioned by the Canadian Stage Company of Toronto, starring Tony Award-winner Brent Carver, "Larry's Party" broke box office records in Toronto before enjoying equally successful runs in Ottawa and Winnipeg as well as being nominated for a Dora Award for Best New Musical.

The scripts to Dracula, Emily, and Larry's Party were published by McArthur & Company.

He has written the book for another musical retelling of the famous vampire legend. This one is called Dracula - Entre l'amour et la mort, starring Bruno Pelletier, and had its premiere in Montreal in February 2006 to rave notices and toured successfully throughout Quebec until December 2006, making its European debut in Lyon, France, in January 2008.

His earlier works for the stage include the 1978 off-Broadway revue A Bistro Car on the C.N.R. and musical adaptations of The Merry Wives of Windsor, Two Gentlemen of Verona, Macbeth, and Love's Labour's Lost. Original musicals include Olympiad, O, Juan de Fuca!, Reprise, Cornucopia, The Great Adventure and Hasten to Come Before Winter.

Ouzounian also wrote the plays Come Out, Come Out, Wherever You Are, The Chekhov Kids, British Properties, The City Show, and Westmount. He has also written adaptations/translations of Scapin, Tartuffe and Encore Brel.

In 2009, he directed the Canadian premiere production of Jerry Springer: The Opera, at Hart House Theatre, in Toronto, which broke box-office records for the theatre. Unlike other productions of the show, it was not targeted by protests, threats, or hate-mail.

=== Radio and television ===
From January 1990 through June 2004, Ouzounian was the host of the Canadian Broadcasting Corporation's musical theatre program Say It With Music, which aired every Sunday on CBC Radio 2 across Canada and worldwide on the internet. Author Bob Martin has often said that the character of Man In Chair in "The Drowsy Chaperone" was inspired by Ouzounian's broadcasts.

During the period from March 1991 through May 2000, he was also the theatre critic for CBC Radio One Toronto (formerly CBLA) reviewing shows on a weekly basis.

From 1995 to 2000, he was Creative Head of Arts at TVOntario, Canada's largest educational broadcaster, where his duties included hosting 104 episodes of the arts interview series Dialogue, and executive producing the three-time Gemini-nominated book series Imprint.

He also served as producer/host/interviewer for CBC Television on a 13-part series about the 50-year history of the Stratford Festival entitled Stratford Gold, which aired in the summer of 2002 and was published simultaneously in book form by McArthur & Company.

Starting in 2021, he created and directed a series of musical programs for the Stratford Festival's streaming network, Stratfest@Home: "Up Close and Musical", "Northern Tracks" and "Never Doubt I Love".

=== Other pursuits ===
Ouzounian was President of the Board of the Arts Foundation of Toronto from 1996–98. He has served on the boards of Community Living Toronto and Surrey Place Foundation, as well as organizing fundraising galas for both organizations, including the popular series of “Night of Stars” Concerts for Community Living Toronto, featuring artists like Colm Wilkinson, Louise Pitre and The Barenaked Ladies.

Ouzounian has taught and/or directed at the University of British Columbia, Simon Fraser University, the University of Winnipeg, Dalhousie University, George Brown College and Sheridan College.

From 2020 through 2023, he was employed by Lighthouse Immersive as their Creative Consultant, providing the books for Immersive Van Gogh, Immersive Klimt, Immersive Frida and Immersive Mozart, as well as working on their productions of Immersive Monet and the Impressionists, Immersive Treasures of the Vatican and Immersive King Tut. He has also provided editing and copywriting services on numerous projects for Korins Studios.

== Honours and awards ==
He was made an honorary Doctor of Sacred Letters by Thorneloe University in 2003.

== Personal life ==
Ouzounian lives in downtown Toronto and has been married since 1977 to his wife, Pamela. They have two children.

== Bibliography ==
- Are You Trying to Seduce Me, Miss Turner? Stars talk to the Star ISBN 978-1-55278-360-3
- Stratford Gold ISBN 978-1-55278-271-2
