= Fangbone! =

- Genre: Action comedy; Adventure
- Based on: Fangbone! Third Grade Barbarian by Michael Rex
- Developed by: Simon Racioppa & Richard Elliott
- Directed by: Kyle Marshall; Joey So; Dave Barton Thomas
- Voices of: Taylor Abrahamse; Colin Doyle; Juan Chioran; Mike Kiss
- Theme music composer: Taylor Abrahamse; Grayson Matthews
- Opening theme: "Fangbone!" performed by Peter Dreimanis
- Composer: Rob Melamed for Grayson Matthews
- Country of origin: Canada
- Original language: English
- No. of seasons: 1
- No. of episodes: 26 (47 segments)

Production
- Executive producers: John Leitch; Michelle Melanson Cuperus (episodes 2–26); Michael Rex; Richard Elliot; Simon Racioppa
- Running time: 22 minutes (2 11-minute segments)
- Production companies: Mercury Filmworks (episode 1); Pipeline Studios (episodes 2–26); DHX Media (episodes 2–26); Radical Sheep Productions

Original release
- Network: Family CHRGD (Canada); Disney XD (United States)
- Release: May 4, 2014 – January 24, 2017

Fangbone! is a Canadian animated children's television series developed by Simon Racioppa & Richard Elliott for Family Chrgd. The series follows the titular character, who is a nine-year-old barbarian warrior from Skullbania, to become evil forces to rush from elementary school to save his friend Bill Goodwin and to witness the evil Venomous Drool.

Loosely based on the books by Michael Rex, the series is produced by Radical Sheep Productions and Pipeline Studios in association with DHX Media, it premiered on May 4, 2014 and the series' original run ended on January 24, 2017. 26 episodes were produced.

== Plot ==
Fangbone is a nine-year-old barbarian warrior from Skullbania who has landed in Eastwood Elementary's third grade class to save his native land from the vile villain, Venomous Drool. With the help of his new sidekick Bill, a lovable, normal, goofy kid, Fangbone outwits his enemies while discovering the modern world, and the realities of his own world.

== Characters ==
=== Main ===
- Fangbone (voiced by Taylor Abrahamse) – Fangbone is a 9-year-old barbarian from Skullbania who travels through a magical portal into the suburbs of Earth on a dangerous mission. Abrahamse also plays Fangbone's occasional preppy alter-ego, Fred Bone.
- Bill Goodwin (voiced by Colin Doyle) — Bill becomes Fangbone's best friend. Bill is a kid whose weirdness is his ultimate weapon, and he helps Fangbone survive life on Earth.
- Venomous Drool (voiced by Juan Chioran) — Venomous Drool is the most evil sorcerer in the universe! Drool lost his big toe – which has evil powers – so he sends his minions to get it back from Fangbone.

=== Supporting ===
- Ms. Gillian (voiced by Kathy Lasky; her evil voice from "Warbrute of Friendship" voiced by Juan Chioran) — Ms. Gillian is Bill and Fangbone's third-grade teacher at school.
- Ms. Goodwin (voiced by Stacey DePass) — Bill's Mom can be kind of silly but she's always there to take care of Bill and Fangbone.
- Twinkle-Stick Wink-Winklestick-Stick (voiced by Mike Kiss) — He is a wizard of the Mighty Lizard Clan.

=== Also starring ===
- Mike Kiss — Grimeblade, Troll, Pigotaur, One-Eye
- Stacey DePass — Stacy, Eddy
- Denise Oliver — Patty, Selena, Ann, Additional voices
- Matt Baram — Principal Bruce, Robert, Dr. Smilebright, Janitor
- Ron Pardo — Clapperclaw, Narrator, Short Leg, AxeBear, Helmet Troll, Lazy Troll, Dr. Toothsbane, Lord Goblin, Orc, Grimeblade, Clump, Clod
- Shemar Charles — Dibby (pilot episode only)
- Cameron Ansell — Dibby (2nd episode and onwards)
- Kedar Brown — Hairfang
- Tony Daniels — Carl, Warwagon
- Mairi Babb — Melodica
- Stephen McHattie — Duck of Always
- Bryn McAuley — Cid
- Martin Roach — Stoneback
- Juan Chioran — Doctor
- Nicole Stamp — Ingrit
- Cory Doran — Kael, Skeletom, Hound, Doomgazer, Devon, Toofbreaker
- Julie Lemieux — Hammerscab, The Toe
- Linda Ballantyne — Wargrunt
- Rob Tinkler — Borb

== Episodes ==
No.	Title	Directed by	Written by	Storyboarded by	Original release date	U.S. air date
1	"Warbrute of Friendship"	Kyle Marshall	Simon Racioppa & Richard Elliott	Jeff Barker	May 4, 2014 (pilot)	Unaired
Fangbone and Bill's friendships are tested when they both want the new electric guitar and matters worst Drool takes control of Bill's teacher to make them fight each other.
2a	"The Squeak of Might"	Joey So	Josh Saltzman	Halya Chase	March 29, 2016	July 5, 2016
Fangbone's thrilled for Bill when he gets a Spirit Beast Companion - the mighty Squee-Claw. But disappointed with the adorable fluff ball, Bill summons the Spirit Beast of someone else, a dangerous Tar Dragon. With Fangbone's help, Bill realizes how cool the Squee-Claw is – clever, loyal and unrelenting – and together they rescue the class and send the Tar Dragon back from where it came.
2b	"The Lies of Truth"	Joey So	Simon Racioppa & Richard Elliott	Mark Thornton	March 29, 2016	July 5, 2016
Fangbone discovers a real Skullbanian clan on Earth masquarding as medieval reenactors. But when he enlists their help against Drool's undefeatable Dreadhorn, they run in fear. Bill uses their theatrical skills to put on a Battle Royale against an unsuspecting Fangbone that makes the Dreadhorn question going up against such a formidable foe. Note: This is the first episode that Venomous Drool was absent, although they mention his name.
3a	"The Polluted Light of Destiny"	Joey So	Mike Kiss	Mark Thornton	April 5, 2016	July 6, 2016
Fangbone struggles to understand his destiny written in the stars of the planetarium, when thanks to Drool, he sees the Moonbear of No Tomorrow - a sure omen of his impending end. Bill tries to convince Fangbone that destiny is what you make it as he's forced to be the sole protector of the Toe and fight off the come-to-life Moonbear.
3b	"The Warwagon of Trust"	Joey So	Simon Racioppa & Richard Elliott	Kyu Bum Lee	April 5, 2016	July 6, 2016
After a rough week battling Drool's monsters, Bill convinces Fangbone to take a break, let him carry the Toe for a while, and have some fun! But somewhere along the way, Bill loses the Toe! It becomes a race against Drool's Warwagon to find the Toe first, and to regain Fangbone's trust.
4a	"The Thundercrush of Responsibility"	Joey So & Dave Barton Thomas	Mike Kiss	Frank Lintzen	April 12, 2016	July 7, 2016
Fangbone trades in all his battle trophies for a massive battle-beast, the Thundercrush! But when the monster proves more than the boys can handle, Fangbone must stop seeing her as a living weapon and show his beast some affection before they're Thundercrushed!
4b	"The Goat of More Goat"	Joey So & Dave Barton Thomas	Josh Saltzman	Adam Temple	April 12, 2016	July 7, 2016
Drool unleashes his most diabolical curse, the MO-AR GO-AT – turning everyone, including Bill's Mom, into goats! Drool gives Bill an ultimatum – he’ll give Bill the anti-goat if he hands over the Toe. Bill is stuck between a goat-mom and a hard place, until he realizes that there's a way to out-goat Drool and save the ones he loves.
5a	"The Swamp of Education"	Joey So	Simon Racioppa & Richard Elliott	Hayla Chase	April 19, 2016	July 13, 2016
Fangbone and Bill skip the research for their project on swamps and just capture a bunch of creatures for a "swamp-bucket" instead. But when the toe accidentally falls in, the school gets transformed into a swamp. Only through books can they get the school back to normal and save Ms. Gillian from life as a giant mutant frog!
5b	"The Ballad of Meh"	Joey So	Amy Benham	Mark Thornton	April 19, 2016	July 13, 2016
Bill's bummed that no one can know about all the cool monster fighting he and Fangbone do. But when Drool sends out Melodica, the Lady of the Lute, to sing about their 'glory' – and steal the toe – Bill forgets about the need for celebrity and challenges Melodic to an epic rap battle with the fate of both worlds at stake!
6	"The Duck of Always"	Joey So	Simon Racioppa & Richard Elliott	Frank Lintzen (Part 1) & Kyu Bum Lee	April 26, 2016	July 14, 2016
After nearly losing the toe, Bill's wracked with guilt and questions whether he's right to help Fangbone protect the Toe and keep the world safe. Worse, a Skullbanian thief, CID, takes advantage of Bill's lack of confidence as he and Fangbone face Drool's most relentless foe, the Duck of Always. Fangbone and Bill face their most relentless foe yet - The Duck of Always, a duck cursed with immortality which can never die or stay destroyed and can also talk. Worse, Cid attacks at the same time and steals the Toe. It's only when Bill realizes that giving up is the only thing to fear, that he comes up with a plan to defeat the Duck and Cid together.
7a	"The Cavity of Terror"	Joey So & Dave Barton Thomas	Josh Saltzman	Halya Chase	May 10, 2016	July 15, 2016
When Fangbone has an awful toothache, Bill discovers Fangbone's greatest fear – dentists! But when Bill and the other classmates all get transformed into teeth by the horrific Toothsbane, Fangbone must find a way to face his fear and turn the tables on this toothy menace.
7b	"The Sickness of Home"	Joey So & Dave Barton Thomas	Josh Saltzman	Mark Thornton	May 10, 2016	July 15, 2016
On an overnight trip to the museum, Fangbone and Bill discover a Skullbanian relic that transforms a mural into a gateway to a Skullbania-like world. It's exactly what Fangbone needs to cure a bout of homesickness! But when a Razor-worm escapes into the museum and cocoons his classmates, Fangbone faces a tough choice – to save his friends he must smash the relic and lose this connection to home forever.
8a	"The Future of Mom"	Joey So & Dave Barton Thomas	Amy Benham	Kyu Bum Lee	May 17, 2016	February 22, 2017
The Toe's evil magic creates an alternate reality where Bill's Mom is the Toe-keeper instead of Fangbone and Bill. The two battle brothers must earn the trust of this hardened warrior to set things right.
8b	"The Ball of Clobbering"	Joey So & Dave Barton Thomas	Mike Kiss	Hayla Chase	May 17, 2016	February 22, 2017
Fangbone decides to whip the kids into fighting shape by teaching them CLOBBERBALL, a painful Skullbanian game. But when Drool challenges their team, Fangbone learns that his classmates have different kinds of strength.
9a	"The Rowboat of Dibby"	Joey So	Simon Racioppa & Richard Elliott	Frank Lintzen	May 24, 2016	February 23, 2017
Wanna-be robot Dibby wants to be a hero like Fangbone and Bill – so he steals the Toe of Evil to turn himself into a real robot. When Drool re-programs Robo-Dibby – Dibby becomes the hero he always wanted to be by helping his friends defeat himself!
9b	"The Necktie of Change"	Joey So	Amy Benham	Kyu Bum Lee	May 24, 2016	February 23, 2017
Photo day goes badly wrong when the Toe transforms Fangbone in Fred Bone – a tie-wearing, utensil using fancy boy! Fangbone saves the Toe, but loses himself – at least until Bill photo-shops a cure.
10a	"The Leg of Broken"	Joey So & Dave Barton Thomas	Dave Dias	Frank Lintzen	May 31, 2016	February 24, 2017
When Fangbone breaks his leg, he must learn to rely on his friends to protect the Toe of Evil from Drool's monsters.
10b	"The Iron Fist of Bruce"	Joey So & Dave Barton Thomas	Dave Dias	Frank Lintzen	May 31, 2016	February 24, 2017
Skullbanian Heritage Day’ at school gets out of hand when Principal Bruce gets carried away being a clan leader and begins a reign of terror!
11a	"The Helmit of Durling"	Joey So & Dave Barton Thomas	Josh Saltzman	Hayla Chase	June 7, 2016	February 28, 2017
When Bill puts on the cursed Helmit of Duling and grows to be too large and incompetent, Fangbone's forced to save him and the Toe.
11b	"The House of Leaving"	Joey So & Dave Barton Thomas	Josh Saltzman	Mark Thornton	June 7, 2016	February 28, 2017
When Bill convinces Fangbone to stay inside all day watching movies, Fangbone comes down with Hovelfroth, a barbarian affliction that turns him into a wild animal.
12	"The Field of Trip of Mayhem"	Joey So & Dave Barton Thomas	Simon Racioppa & Richard Elliott	Kyu Bum Lee	June 14, 2016	March 1, 2017
When Fangbone's class goes on a field trip to Skullbania, he is given a once-in-a-thousand-year chance to destroy the Toe of Evil. But, when Fangbone must choose between destroying the Toe and saving his friendship with Bill, he must make an impossible choice.
13a	"The Mom of No Return"	Joey So & Dave Barton Thomas	Amy Benham	Halya Chase	June 21, 2016	March 2, 2017
When Bill's Mom accidentally spots Fangbone and Bill fighting Drool's Razorworm, she decides on a harsh punishment.
13b	"The Back of Stone"	Joey So & Dave Barton Thomas	Simon Racioppa & Richard Elliott	Mark Thornton	June 21, 2016	March 2, 2017
The legendary Stoneback arrives to help protect the Toe, but Fangbone's star-struck and unwilling to listen to Bill, who suspects that this might not be the real barbarian deal.
14a	"The Bucket of Goblins"	Joey So & Dave Barton Thomas	Amy Benham	Frank Lintzen	November 1, 2016	March 3, 2017
The battle for Toe takes a turn when it falls into the hands of goblins.
14b	"The Bill of Magic"	Joey So & Dave Barton Thomas	Amy Benham	Adam Temple	November 1, 2016	March 3, 2017
Bill learns that taking shortcuts with his magic talent can have serious consequences.
15a	"The Present of Feathers"	Joey So & Dave Barton Thomas	Josh Saltzman	Halya Chase	November 8, 2016	March 6, 2017
Bill's got the perfect gifts for his mom's birthday, but it all goes terribly wrong when Drool's Feather-Phoenix attacks, forcing him to choose between saving the Toe and saving his mom's birthday gifts.
15b	"The Waffle of Iron"	Joey So & Dave Barton Thomas	Dave Dias	Kyu Bum Lee	November 8, 2016	March 6, 2017
When one of Drool's monsters attacks with a magical sword, Fangbone and Bill stop him with their beloved waffle iron.
16a	"The Drool of Young"	Joey So & Dave Barton Thomas	Dave Dias	Frank Litzen	November 15, 2016	March 7, 2017
The Toe accidentally create a young Drool and Fangbone and Bill take it as an opportunity to turn Drool good.
16b	"The Kat of Munching"	Joey So & Dave Barton Thomas	Simon Racioppa & Richard Elliott	Adam Temple	November 15, 2016	March 7, 2017
When Fangbone becomes addicted to Munchie-Kat, a cheesy video game, Drool brings it to life to consume Fangbone's waking hours.
17a	"The Twinkle of Stick"	Joey So & Dave Barton Thomas	Simon Racioppa & Richard Elliott	Mark Thornton	November 22, 2016	March 8, 2017
At parent-teacher night, Fangbone and Bill are forced to pretend Twinkle-stick is Fangbone's totally normal human parent.
17b	"The Burg of Lar"	Joey So & Dave Barton Thomas	Josh Saltzman	Kyu Bum Lee	November 22, 2016	March 8, 2017
When Cid shows up to steal the Toe, Fangbone and Bill capture her, only to discover that the Shadowsteppers sent more thieves to finish the job.
18a	"The Hound of Hounding"	Joey So & Dave Barton Thomas	Josh Saltzman	Frank Lintzen	November 29, 2016	March 9, 2017
After Bill accidentally melts Fangbone's most precious sword, he lies about it and accidentally summons the Hound of Hounding, a Skullbanian demon dog.
18b	"The Defeat of Glory"	Joey So & Dave Barton Thomas	Josh Sager & Jerome Simpson	Adam Temple	November 29, 2016	March 9, 2017
After hearing stories of Fangbone's battle victories, Hammerscab, a barbarian warrior, travels to Earth to test her strength against his.
19a	"The Forehead of Despair"	Joey So & Dave Barton Thomas	Simon Racioppa & Richard Elliott	Halya Chase	December 6, 2016	March 10, 2017
After the Toe becomes magically attached to Bill's forehead, he finds himself slowly turning green.
19b	"The Mall of Doom"	Joey So & Dave Barton Thomas	Simon Racioppa & Richard Elliott	Dave Baggley	December 6, 2016	March 10, 2017
When Bill and the kids take Fangbone to Mallhala to buy new clothes, Drool unleashes his Pigataur to take the Toe.
20	"The Breaker of Oaths"	Joey So & Dave Barton Thomas	Simon Racioppa & Richard Elliott	Brian Wong (Part 1) Kyu Bum Lee (Part 2)	December 13, 2016	March 13, 2017
Bill lies to Drool and tricks him into falling into the NIGHTLANDS, and he and Fangbone think they've defeated the evil wizard forever.
21a	"The Pitch of Black"	Dave Barton Thomas	Dave Dias	Frank Lintzen	December 20, 2016	March 14, 2017
Fangbone attempts to train the kids in Skullbanian outdoor survival by taking them camping in the park.
21b	"The Keeper of Toe"	Dave Barton Thomas	Simon Racioppa & Richard Elliott	Adam Temple	December 20, 2016	March 14, 2017
Bill gets a former Drool-keeper to help Fangbone relax.
22a	"The Groan of Up"	Dave Barton Thomas	Simon Racioppa & Richard Elliott	Randeep Katari	December 27, 2016	March 15, 2017
Fangbone and Bill take control of Clapperclaw and Grimeblade's huge barbarian bodies.
22b	"The Shadow of Bill"	Dave Barton Thomas	Josh Saltzman	Brian Wong	December 27, 2016	March 15, 2017
After Fangbone and Bill discover Cid living in Cavebania, Drool sends his DIRE RAZORWORM to devour them all.
23a	"The Fred of Bone"	Dave Barton Thomas	Amy Benham	Frank Lintzen	January 3, 2017	March 16, 2017
Fred Bone returns when Fangbone splits himself in two, recreating his upper class double to take his place at school.
23b	"The Star of Gold"	Dave Barton Thomas	Amy Benham	Adam Temple	January 3, 2017	March 16, 2017
A dispirited Ms. Gillian accidentally gets transported to Skullbania and imprisoned by Drool.
24a	"The Brothers of Battle"	Dave Barton Thomas	Josh Sager & Jerome Simpson	Halya Chase	January 10, 2017	March 17, 2017
Drool makes his own barbarian-human combo to steal the Toe.
24b	"The Pizzas of Day"	Dave Barton Thomas	Dale Schott	Brian Wong	January 10, 2017	March 17, 2017
Fangbone forcibly removes all fun from the kids' lives in fear of a Drool trick, the class rebels when he outlaws school pizza day.
25a	"The Cheeks of Darkness"	Dave Barton Thomas	Josh Sager & Jerome Simpson	Mark Thornton & Frank Lintzen	January 17, 2017	March 20, 2017
After a series of omens, Stoneback's legendary sword falls from the sky.
25b	"The Forging of Friendship"	Dave Barton Thomas	Simon Racioppa & Richard Elliott	Halya Chase	January 17, 2017	March 20, 2017
Fangbone and Bill tell the story of how they first met to show how two very different people can become the best of friends.
26	"The End of the Beginning"	Dave Barton Thomas	Simon Racioppa & Richard Elliott	Adam Temple (Part 1) and Frank Lintzen (Part 2)	January 24, 2017	March 21, 2017
Fangbone and Bill find themselves facing a more powerful Drool face-to-face after he combines Skullbania and Earth into a single world and regains his Toe.

== Broadcast ==
The show premiered on Disney XD in the United States on July 5, 2016, and premiered on February 25, 2017 in Southeast Asia, and at unknown date in Taiwan and Latin America. On October 15, 2016, it first aired in Australia on ABC Me. In France, it first aired on Canal J on March 18, 2017. In the U.K., it started airing on CITV on April 3, 2017. In Germany, it started airing on Super RTL in 2015. In Italy, it aired on K2, and on the Italian version of Disney XD. It was on the Netflix streaming service from April 21, 2017 to 2021. Full episodes of the series began to upload on an official YouTube channel starting in June 2025.
