= George of the Jungle season 2 =

George of the Jungle
- Season 2
- Starring: Cory Doran; Paul Dobson; Britt Irvin; Linda Ballantyne; Mark Oliver
- No. of episodes: 26

Release
- Original network: Teletoon
- Original release: September 10, 2016 – February 18, 2017

The second season of George of the Jungle is an animated television series that was co-animated in 2015 by Singapore-based August Media Holdings and Yowza Digital of Canada. The revival series is based on the original animated series produced in 1967 by Jay Ward and Bill Scott and later remade by Teletoon in 2007.

This revival series takes a new look at George. The show has been redesigned and redeveloped by producer Jyotirmoy Saha of August Media Holdings.

By April 2016, 52 episodes of George of the Jungle 2015 TV series had been produced and they have been sold in over 160 countries.

== Background ==
The first George of the Jungle animated series came out in 1967. 1997 saw the release of the films George of the Jungle 1 and 2 and in 2007, another George of the Jungle TV series was produced.

== Plot ==
Like any proper jungle king, George is strong. George is pure of heart and George is well not very bright. George is a big-hearted jungle king who throws himself into his job like any teenage boy would – with boundless enthusiasm and reckless abandon.

George lives in a jungle filled with lions, anacondas, swarms of giant bees, skat-talking man eating plants and more. To top it all, there’s a whole array of evil villains gunning for George and his beloved wilderness. From the great hunters Tiger Titherage and Weevil Plumtree, who love nothing more than to mount George above their fireplace, to Dr. Chicago, a dentist-turned-even-more-evil-dentist to Edward Madmun, an English aristocrat who loves fiendish schemes almost as much as high tea!

Riding herd over the craziest jungle on the planet means the insanity comes fast and furious. Thank the jungle spirits he has a few friends who can help him in his twisted adventures like George’s best buddy Ape, science-obsessed Magnolia, headstrong huckster Ursula, Howie the Howler Monkey, the bird-brained Tookie-Tookie Bird, and George’s overworked pachyderm, Shep. George’s screwball logic and ill-conceived plans lead him and his pals into ridiculous situations and crazy detours that drive everyone in the animal kingdom bananas. But in the end, George always rises above the mayhem and saves the day with bizarre George logic that twists expectations and delights audiences.

== Starring ==
- Cory Doran as George, Tookie-Tookie Bird
- Robert Tinkler as Ape
- Linda Ballantyne as Magnolia
- Bridget Wareham as Ursula
- Taylor Abrahamse as Cuspid
- Terry McGurrin as Doctor Chicago
- Jeff Lumby as Narrator
- Martin Julien as Witch Doctor

== Episodes ==
No. overall	No. in season	Title	Written by	Canadian air date	Prod. code
27a	1a	"Bringing Silverback"	Richard Elliott and Simon Racioppa	September 10, 2016	201a
Ape must fight his brother Ted for their deceased uncle's silverback, which was recovered from a "Rhino Flood" accident. Note: New episodes are storyboarded by Tom Root and Casey Burke Léonard.
27b	1b	"Of Botflies and Men"	Richard Elliott and Simon Racioppa	September 10, 2016	201b
After eating a botfly, George loses his feelings. Note: The name of this episode is a reference to the novella Of Mice and Men.
28a	2a	"The Insider"	Richard Elliott and Simon Racioppa	September 17, 2016	202a
After eating some outdated mayonnaise, George deals with a parasitic worm in his body. Absent: Ursula (who was called Magnolia in Season 1)
28b	2b	"Clockwork George"	Richard Elliott and Simon Racioppa	September 17, 2016	202b
Note: The name of this episode is a reference to the novel A Clockwork Orange.
29a	3a	"True Bromance"	Dale Schott	September 24, 2016	203a
29b	3b	"George x 4"	Dan Williams and Lienne Sawatsky	September 24, 2016	203b
30a	4a	"As Strong As He Can Tree"	Richard Elliott and Simon Racioppa	October 1, 2016	204a
30b	4b	"George’s Song"	Dan Williams and Lienne Sawatsky	October 1, 2016	204b
31a	5a	"Queen of the Desert"	Dan Williams	October 8, 2016	205a
31b	5b	"Kings and Little Ones"	Dale Schott	October 8, 2016	205b
32a	6a	"Renaissance Ape"	Richard Elliott and Simon Racioppa	October 15, 2016	206a
32b	6b	"My Georging Jacket"	Richard Elliott and Simon Racioppa	October 15, 2016	206b
33a	7a	"Bananium Deficiency"	Josh Sager and Jerome Simpson	October 22, 2016	207a
33b	7b	"I Gotta Beave Me"	Mike Kiss	October 22, 2016	207b
34a	8a	"Nature’s Call"	Josh Sager and Jerome Simpson	October 29, 2016	208a
After he defeats Ursula in the jungle vote, George must go to the dark heart of the jungle to get her back. Absent: Magnolia
34b	8b	"Much Ado About Stuffing"	Ian MacIntyre	October 29, 2016	208b
35a	9a	"Steve of the Jungle"	Richard Elliott and Simon Racioppa	November 5, 2016	209a
35b	9b	"Guess What’s Coming to Dinner"	Dale Schott	November 5, 2016	209b
36a	10a	"Meet Meat"	Simon Racioppa and Richard Elliott	November 12, 2016	210a
36b	10b	"Body Politics"	Dan Williams	November 12, 2016	210b
37a	11a	"Sour Milk"	Dale Schott	November 19, 2016	211a
37b	11b	"Valley of the Magnolias"	Simon Racioppa and Richard Elliott	November 19, 2016	211b
38a	12a	"For Science"	Dale Schott	November 26, 2016	212a
38b	12b	"Cute Is As Cute Does"	Ian MacIntyre	November 26, 2016	212b
39a	13a	"Shadow of a Dolt"	Richard Elliott and Simon Racioppa	December 3, 2016	213a
39b	13b	"Lovecano"	Ian MacIntyre	December 3, 2016	213b
40a	14a	"Strange Daze"	Josh Sager and Jerome Simpson	January 7, 2017	214a
40b	14b	"Lying Cloth"	Mike Kiss	January 7, 2017	214b
41a	15a	"Mess of Kings"	Dan Williams and Lienne Sawatsky	January 8, 2017	215a
41b	15b	"Rip van George"	Dale Schott	January 8, 2017	215b
42a	16a	"Mama Chicago"	Richard Elliott and Simon Racioppa	January 14, 2017	216a
42b	16b	"Reversum Day"	Richard Elliott and Simon Racioppa	January 14, 2017	216b
43a	17a	"Swirl"	Richard Elliott and Simon Racioppa	January 15, 2017	217a
43b	17b	"Junior Jungle Achievers"	Simon Racioppa and Richard Elliott	January 15, 2017	217b
44a	18a	"Wet Behind the Ears"	Josh Sager and Jerome Simpson	January 21, 2017	218a
44b	18b	"Georgus Ex Machina"	Simon Racioppa and Richard Elliott	January 21, 2017	218b
45a	19a	"Breaking Ape"	Ethan Banville	January 28, 2017	219a
Note: This episode is a reference to the movie The Fly.
45b	19b	"Sidekick Chicago"	Dale Schott	January 28, 2017	219b
46a	20a	"The Ursula Solution"	Simon Racioppa and Richard Elliott	January 29, 2017	220a
46b	20b	"George Lays an Egg"	Simon Racioppa and Richard Elliott	January 29, 2017	220b
47a	21a	"Excalibanana"	Simon Racioppa and Richard Elliott	January 22, 2017	221a
47b	21b	"The Flavour of Science"	Richard Clark	January 22, 2017	221b
48a	22a	"The George Who Would Be King"	Dale Schott	February 4, 2017	222a
48b	22b	"The Peel of Fate"	Dan Williams and Lienne Sawatsky	February 4, 2017	222b
49a	23a	"Were-George"	Richard Clark	February 5, 2017	223a
49b	23b	"Master of Macho"	Simon Racioppa and Richard Elliott	February 5, 2017	223b
50a	24a	"Trial by Jungle"	Simon Racioppa and Richard Elliott	February 11, 2017	224a
50b	24b	"Slothpocalypto"	Dale Schott	February 11, 2017	224b
51a	25a	"Beave Us Alone"	Dan Williams and Lienne Sawatsky	February 12, 2017	225a
51b	25b	"Original Jungle Kings"	Richard Clark	February 12, 2017	225b
52a	26a	"The Last Treehugger"	Simon Racioppa and Richard Elliott	February 18, 2017	226a
52b	26b	"Heart of Gold"	Simon Racioppa and Richard Elliott	February 18, 2017	226b

== Notes ==
- Misspelled as "Greg Sulivan" in a title card.
