= Stay the Night (2022 film) =

2022 Canadian film directed by Renuka Jeyapalan

- Film poster
- Directed by: Renuka Jeyapalan
- Written by: Renuka Jeyapalan
- Produced by: Glenn Cockburn; Brian Robertson
- Starring: Andrea Bang; Joey Scarpellino
- Cinematography: Conor Fisher
- Edited by: Tiffany Beaudin
- Music by: The Wilders
- Production companies: Low End; Relay Station
- Distributed by: Photon Films and Media; Freestyle Entertainment
- Release dates: March 12, 2022 (SXSW); October 7, 2022 (United States)
- Running time: 94 minutes
- Country: Canada
- Language: English

Stay the Night is a 2022 Canadian romantic drama film written and directed by Renuka Jeyapalan. The film stars Andrea Bang and Joey Scarpellino. It was released to positive reviews from critics and was nominated for Best Sound Editing and Best Sound Mixing at the 2023 Canadian Screen Awards.

== Premise ==
Grace is a woman who decides to seek out a one-night stand with a man after being passed over for a promotion at work for being too reserved; visiting a bar she meets Carter, a professional hockey player who is also at a career crossroads, with the two making a more profound emotional connection over the course of the evening than either expected.

== Cast ==
- Andrea Bang as Grace
- Joe Scarpellino as Carter
- Humberly González as Joni
- Raymond Ablack as Roshan
- Graham Abbey as Coach Matthews
- Raven Dauda as Claire

== Release ==
The film premiered in March 2022 at South by Southwest. It was later released in theaters on October 7, 2022.

== Critical reception ==
On the review aggregation website Rotten Tomatoes, the film holds an approval rating of 88%, based on 16 critics' reviews.
