= The Future Is Wild (2007 TV series) =

- Genre: Science fiction Adventure
- Developed by: Steve Sullivan
- Written by: Doug Molitor
- Directed by: Mike Fallows
- Creative director: Mike Fallows
- Voices of: Ashley Peters; Taylor Abrahamse; Marc Donato; Miranda Jones; Richard Binsley; Cedric Smith
- Theme music composer: Volcano Music
- Opening theme: "The Future Is Wild" by Sarah Hallman
- Composer: TTG Music
- Countries of origin: Canada; Singapore
- Original language: English
- No. of episodes: 26 (list of episodes)

Production
- Executive producers: John Adams; Eric Chan Meng Koo; Derek Reeves; Chua Woo; Scott Dyer; Doug Murphy
- Producers: Lisa Schulz; Jane Sobol
- Production locations: Toronto, Ontario, Canada
- Cinematography: Maricia Rusoman
- Editor: Jamie Thomson
- Running time: 22 minutes
- Production companies: Nelvana Limited; IVL Animation

Original release
- Network: Discovery Kids (USA); Teletoon (Canada)
- Release: October 13, 2007 – July 5, 2008

The Future Is Wild is a CGI-animated adventure television series based on the Canadian 2002 joint Animal Planet/ORF (Austria) and ZDF (Germany) co-production The Future Is Wild. The series was produced by Nelvana and IVL Animation in association with Teletoon and Discovery Kids. Brett Jubinville designed the characters and creatures for the series.

The show follows four teenagers (CG, Luis, Emily and Ethan) who study the future of the Earth to find a new habitat for humanity, while learning about the futuristic creatures who inhabit it. The show ran for one season with 26 episodes. It features creatures speculated about in the original version of The Future Is Wild, albeit with highly fictionalized elements.

== Premise ==
10,000 years into the future, humanity is threatened by a mega ice age. Cassiopeia G. (nicknamed CG or "Ceeg" by her friends) is sent on a time machine called the Time Flyer to find a new habitat for humanity. While in the Northern Forest, a creature known as a "Squibbon" has stowed away on the Time Flyer, accidentally transporting CG to the 21st century. Once there, CG is greeted by three teenage friends: Ethan, Emily, and Luis. The three then accompany her on her mission of exploring different eras of the future while encountering their strange populace of evolved animals.

== Reception ==
The show has garnered strong ratings on both the American and Canadian partners of Discovery Kids, leading to worldwide distributions, including the United Kingdom, Russia, Germany, Portugal, Romania, Turkey, Hungary, Poland, Ukraine and the Middle East. Episodes are also available on certain airlines and online.

In 2008, it was nominated for an Artios award for 'Outstanding Achievement In Casting', and Marc Donato was nominated for a Young Artist Award for Best Performance In A Voice-Over role.

In 2009, Mike Fallows was nominated for a Daytime Emmy Award for Best Direction In a Children's Series.

In 2009, Steve Sullivan was nominated for a Daytime Emmy for Outstanding Writing In a Children's Series for his work on the show.

The show was also nominated for a Daytime Emmy for Best Sound in a children's series.

== Characters ==
- Cassiopeia G. (voiced by Ashley Peters), nicknamed CG, is the Time Flyer's captain and originates from 12,000 AD. She is often cautious and robotic in nature, but as she spends more time with Emily, Luis, and Ethan, she becomes more open and expressive.
- Ethan Bolato (voiced by Marc Donato) is adventurous and daring, he is willing to do most of the more dangerous tasks that the crew's mission provides, taking them as a challenge. Ethan often cracks bad jokes and teases Luis of his overly-cautious attitude.
- Emily Lonartae (voiced by Miranda Jones) is a motherly animal lover who tries to see the best qualities in both animals and people. She takes care of Squibbon and they both adore each other.
- Luis Calabasas (voiced by Taylor Abrahamse) is arguably the smartest in the crew and prefers to stay in the ship to avoid the future's hostile environments and dangerous creatures. He often freaks out and is slightly obsessive over hygiene and germs.
- Squibbon (voiced by Richard Binsley) is an evolved squid that stowed away on the Time Flyer on CG's first mission. His inner monologue refers to the others as his "hairy heads" and he often communicates with the other evolved creatures.
- CG's father (voiced by Cedric Smith) informs CG of what the crew's mission objectives are in each environment. He does not approve of CG bringing Ethan, Emily, and Luis along, often calling them "primitives".

== Episodes ==
All episodes were directed by Mike Fallows.

No.	Title	Original release date
1	"The Electric Fisherman"	October 13, 2007
The crew must lure and use two lurkfish to jump start the Time Flyer or be stuck in the Bengal swamp, 100 million years in the future. Gill and Butch, two hungry lurkfish, argue over who gets to eat Ethan.
2	"Extreme Bird Watching"	October 13, 2007
Ethan goes alone bird watching in an Antarctic rain forest, and is attacked by falconflies. Nix, an overconfident spitfire beetle, is trying to find his friends when they are separated.
3	"Sky High Anxiety"	October 20, 2007
CG tries to launch a weather station 100 million years in the future, but a great blue windrunner crashes into it and now they must find a way to take care of both her and her chicks.
4	"Toratonnage"	October 27, 2007
While the crew's Time Flyer is stuck in mud, Luis stays to try to fix it while the rest of them investigate an unusual heat source. Meanwhile, an elderly Toraton, Stoney, trying to reach a Toraton Graveyard, falls asleep on the Time Flyer thinking it is a rock.
5	"Think Big"	November 3, 2007
The crew accidentally knock a Toraton mom on her back and Luis becomes a de facto parent to a pair of Toraton infants.
6	"Squibbon See, Squibbon Do"	November 10, 2007
While the crew is in the Bengal swamp 100 million years in the future, the always playful Squibbon runs off with the telecommunicator key which is the only way CG can communicate with her father. Squibbon tries to get the key back from a Swampus.
7	"A Poggle's Not a Pet...Yet"	December 1, 2007
Emily attempts to do some girl bonding with CG in the Great Plateau 100 million years in the future, but they wind up in a situation where they are really going to be closer than ever. A poggle named Geb is suspicious about the Silver spiders who look after him and his friends after a few go missing.
8	"Phantom Fear"	December 15, 2007
Ethan must confront his claustrophobia and CG her arachnophobia when the Time Flyer becomes stuck under an ocean phantom and the crew has to deal with the ocean phantom's tentacles and hungry reef gliders. A cautious reef glider named Bobber is reluctant to chow down on the ocean phantom after hearing tales of their various weapons and defenses.
9	"The Future Is Underground"	January 19, 2008
When blasting forward 200 million years in the future, the Time Flyer crash lands in a desert wasteland and loses most of its water. Luis shrinks Emily, CG and Ethan so they can search a terabyte mound for water. A transporter terabyte tries to gain equality with a warrior terabyte.
10	"Be True to Your Crew"	February 2, 2008
The team discovers that CG is secretly trying to reactivate her former robot crew members. In this episode, it is also shown how CG met Ethan, Emily, Luis and Squibbon.
11	"Night Crawlers"	February 16, 2008
The kids disagree with CG's decision to leave Pangaea 2. CG feels she is not a capable leader. Also, Torq, a rock borer terabyte is curious about the big open outside his home.
12	"De-Tour de France"	March 1, 2008
The kids land on the North European Ice in search of an alloy to repair the Time Flyer. Also, Art, a lazy shagrat herds up with Luis and Ethan after he is separated from his real herd.
13	"Sign of the Time Flyer" "Sign Of The Time"	March 15, 2008
The kids encounter the last primate species on Earth: the babookari. Also, Dex, a babookari is showing some interest in Emily and the Other "no-tails", much to the displeasure of the troop leader, Alpha.
14	"Sweet Home Pangaea II"	March 29, 2008
CG's dad tells her to study Squibbons unaware that they hid one. While visiting the Northern Forest in 200 million AD, the crew finds that Squibby has forgotten his basic survival skills and consider teaching him and then releasing him. Squibby makes friends with other Squibbons after one of them saves him from a Megasquid.
15	"Shallow Pals"	April 5, 2008
CG gives herself, Luis, and Emily food poisoning so Ethan and Squibbon go to investigate an ocean phantom they think is someone's boat. Also, a spindletrooper is unsure of what to defend his ocean phantom from, and so is his leader.
16	"Parent Trap"	April 12, 2008
CG tests a fast-growing crop in the Antarctic Forest, 100 million years in the future. Simile, a false spitfire bird must defend her eggs from spitfire birds and (so she thinks) Emily and Ethan. In this episode, it is hinted that CG and Luis have a crush on each other. Also Ethan may like Emily, by the way he tried to protect her from the false spitfire bird and blushed when she thought it was a hug.
17	"Around the World In 80 Minutes"	April 19, 2008
Luis leaves behind geocaches for other time travelers. However, he does not know that he made them out of a toxic material. The crew must find one in all the environments of 100 million AD in 80 minutes.
18	"Monkey Brains"	April 26, 2008
Ethan dares CG to use the chameliographic helmet to spend time with the babookari and prove she can be silly and wild. After an accident with some carakillers, CG's brain is implanted with babookari behavior patterns. Zodek, the carakiller hunt leader is demoted after being afraid of the "lightning monkey" (CG with the chameliographic helmet) that zapped him and Subo, the new hunt leader, tries to rekindle his spirit.
19	"Swimming With Slickribbons"	May 10, 2008
The kids cannot leave the Central Desert until they wash the Time Flyer. Also, a tough slickribbon named Philo who wants "a meal with a challenge" gets more than he bargained for when he chases a miniaturized Luis in the flooded Time Flyer.
20	"Scared Safe"	May 17, 2008
After an accident on a glacier 5 million years in the future, CG becomes overly protective of the crew. Also, a curious gannetwhale named Tooby investigates the Time Flyer and gets himself, Emily, Ethan, Luis and Squibbon cornered by a snowstalker.
21	"He Might Be Giant"	May 24, 2008
A tree falls on the Time Flyer and the crew uses the molecular compressor to make Ethan large enough to move it. Then, Ethan (still a giant) befriends a megasquid.
22	"A Ghost in the Machine?"	May 31, 2008
The kids test a falconfly repellent. All compounds are unsuccessful, except for a mystery mixture found by CG. Also, things are being lost and the Time Flyer is moving on its own. Moreover, the crew are seeing ghostly copies of themselves. Later it is found that Squibbon has learned to control the Time Flyer and chameliographic helmet and mixed the successful falconfly repellent. He also finds an egg in an unknown era that begins to hatch.
23	"Cure For The Common Megasquid Cold"	June 7, 2008
Luis believes he has a megasquid disease. Squibbon helps a forest flish from a slithersucker, and the flish tries to convince his friends that Squibby is a good Squibbon.
24 25	"Queen of the Squibbons"	June 21, 2008 June 28, 2008
Part 1: During a trip to the Northern Forest 200 million years into the future, Emily discovers a baby squibbon who's been orphaned during a Megasquid attack. Part 2: The crew is trying to get back to the Northern Forest 200 million years in the future where they left Emily, but they are facing some problems.
26	"Snowstalker in a Strange Land"	July 5, 2008
After counting the populations of animals of the Great Northern European ice the crew heads to the Amazon Grasslands not knowing that a Snowstalker has snuck on board.

== Broadcast ==
The series aired on Discovery Kids and premiered in the United States on October 13, 2007. The final episode aired on July 5, 2008. After the series ended, reruns continued to air on The Hub until June 24, 2012.

In Canada, the show first aired on Teletoon on June 28, 2010. In October 2016, Teletoon still aired the show on weekdays at 22:30 EST, but it was eventually taken off the channel's schedule. The show has not been aired on Canadian television since then. The series was formerly available to stream on Tubi and Amazon Prime. At present, the show is no longer available for legal streaming.
