= The Parent Family =

2008 comedy television series

- Genre: comedy
- Developed by: Jacques Davidts
- Starring: Anne Dorval; Daniel Brière; Joey Scarpellino; Raphaël Grenier-Benoît; Louis-Philippe Beauchamp
- Country of origin: Canada
- Original language: French
- No. of seasons: 8
- No. of episodes: 169

Production
- Running time: 21 minutes
- Production companies: La Presse Télé (2008–2013); LP8 Média (2013–2014); Attraction Images (2014–2016); Marleen Beaulieu

Original release
- Network: ICI Radio-Canada Télé
- Release: September 8, 2008 – March 28, 2016

The Parent Family (French: Les Parent) is a French-language comedy television series created by Jacques Davidts. It originally aired on ICI Radio-Canada Télé from 8 September 2008 to 28 March 2016. The series was produced in Canada. It has 8 seasons, containing a total of 169 episodes, each lasting 21 minutes.

== Plot ==
Louis-Paul Parent and Natalie Rivard are the caring parents of three boys: Thomas, the oldest, a lazy teenager who does well academically, Olivier "Oli", a rebellious, manipulative, mischievous, and athletic middle child who loves skateboarding, and Zacharie "Zak", the youngest, a very energetic child.

== Cast ==
- Anne Dorval as Natalie Rivard
- Daniel Brière as Louis-Paul Parent
- Joey Scarpellino as Thomas Parent
- Raphaël Grenier-Benoît as Olivier Parent
- Louis-Philippe Beauchamp as Zacharie Parent
- Alexis Martin as Benoît, Louis-Paul's friend
- Marie-Chantal Perron as Marie, Natalie's friend
- Louise Turcot as Madeleine Rivard, Natalie's mother
- Marcel Sabourin as Bernard Rivard, Natalie's father
- Maude Carmel-Ouellet as Anaïs Laliberté, Thomas's girlfriend
- Jean-Carl Boucher as Jesse, Olivier's friend
- Rosalie Bonenfant as Sarah, Olivier's girlfriend
- Sophie Nélisse as Zoé Larivière-Beaudoin, Zacharie's friend
- Aliocha Schneider as Frédéric-Olivier, Thomas's friend
- Pier-Luc Funk, as Maxime, Thomas's friend
- Alice Morel-Michaud as Alicia, Zacharie's friend
- Olivier Fontaine as Matthew Couture, Zacharie's friend
- Émilien Néron as Cédrick Plourde, Zacharie's friend
- Édith Cochrane as Sylvie, Cédrick's mother
- Mélanie Maynard as Sarah's mother
- Kevin Parent as himself
- Charlotte Legault as Mélissa, Olivier's girlfriend (season 5)
- Kalinka Petrie as Alex Parent, Thomas, Olivier, and Zacharie's cousin (season 5)

== Production and broadcast ==
The Parent Family was created by Jacques Davidts, and produced in Canada by La Presse Télé (2008–2013), LP8 Média (2013–2014), Attraction Images (2014–2016), and Marleen Beaulieu, and distributed by ICI Radio-Canada Télé. The main cast included: Anne Dorval, Daniel Brière, Joey Scarpellino, Raphaël Grenier-Benoît, and Louis-Philippe Beauchamp. The first episode aired on 8 September 2008, on ICI Radio-Canada Télé in Canada. Its final episode aired on 28 March 2016. In total, the show had 8 seasons, containing a total of 169 episodes. Since 4 October 2010, the show also aired in France on Canal+ Family and Gulli channels, in partially redubbed version, modified for the French audience.

== Adaptations ==
In 2011 the show was adapted into a Polish-language series produced by Telewizja Polska, titled Family.pl, which aired until 2020, and again from 2025. In 2015, it was adapted into a Russian-language series titled Roditeli (Russian: Родители) produced by Russia-1 channel. In 2016, it was adapted into a Slovak-language series titled Naši produced by TV JOJ.
