= Taylor Abrahamse =

Canadian voice actress (born 1991)

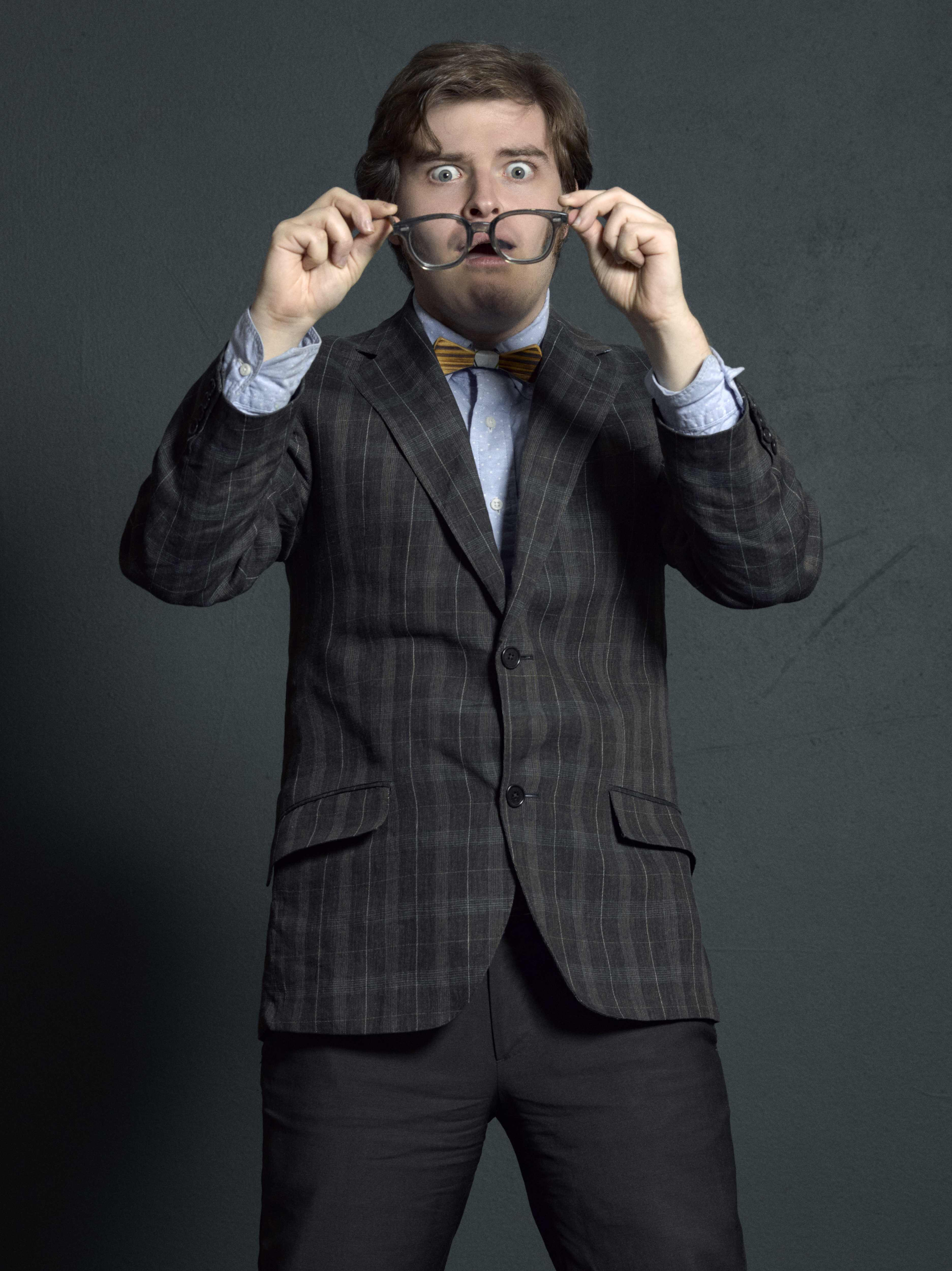
- Abrahamse in 2015
- Born: Taylor Lawrence Abrahamse; May 7, 1991 (age 35); Ontario, Canada
- Occupations: Voice actress; musician
- Years active: 1993–present

Taylor Lawrence Abrahamse (born May 7, 1991) is a Canadian voice actress and musician, most known for Fangbone!, The Stanley Dynamic, Doc, D.N. Ace, and Norman Picklestripes.

== Life and career ==
After begging her parents for an agent at the age of six, she began landing numerous commercials in television and radio, as well as print. Soon, this transitioned over into supporting TV movie and series roles, including Jimmy Osmond in the ABC biopic Inside the Osmonds, and Elliott in PAX TV's Doc, a series starring Billy Ray Cyrus for which Abrahamse was nominated for a Young Actor's Award for "Best Performance in a Supporting Role". Abrahamse also played Cinco in the Ross Petty pantomime Snow White & the Group of Seven, acting and singing alongside Canadian Idols including Ryan Malcolm and Billy Klippert, and Glass Tiger frontman Alan Frew.

As a teenager, Abrahamse was a Top 40 finalist on Canadian Idol. After a spontaneous performance at a music conference, Abrahamse was discovered by Jimi Hendrix producer Eddie Kramer. That album, produced by Kramer with additional production by Abrahamse, was released in 2020. The lead single "I Won't Put Up With It", features a music video largely edited and directed by Abrahamse along with other projects. On the strength of the album, Abrahamse opened for "Hawksley Workman", won the Kerrville Newfolk Songwriting Contest, and has since toured various times through the US and Canada.

Abrahamse voices the lead character in the self-titled series Fangbone! (Disney XD), which began airing in 2016, and has a theme song written by Abrahamse and performed by Peter Driemanis of July Talk. Abrahamse voiced Luke Stanley in YTV's The Stanley Dynamic (Nelvana/Amaze), which lasted for two seasons.

Other voice roles include Luis in The Future Is Wild (Discovery Kids), Yuki in Beyblade: Metal Fury (Cartoon Network), and Jonas in Bob! The Slob (Teletoon), in addition to supporting roles in series such as The Cat in the Hat Knows a Lot About That!, Total DramaRama and Looped. From 2019 to 2021, she and Bryn McAuley voiced the gophers in Norman Picklestripes (Universal Kids) alongside Dwayne Hill as the main character.

== Personal life ==
Abrahamse is a trans woman. She has previously identified as genderfluid.

== Filmography ==
=== Television ===
Year	Title	Role	Notes
1998	Canada: A People's History	Maurice Stanley	1 episode
1998	Power Play	Andy Simpson	2 episodes
2000	Inside the Osmonds	Jimmy Osmond	ABC Movie Of The Week
2001	Crossing the Line	Supporting role	Movie of the Week
2001	Hedwig and the Angry Inch	Singing Boy	Feature Film
2001–04	Doc	Eliott	PAX TV
2006	Runaway	Supporting Role	CW Network
2006	Hockey: A People's History	Young Gordie Howe	1 Episode
2007–08	The Future Is Wild	Luis Calabasas (Lead)	26 episodes/Other Media
2012–13	Beyblade: Metal Fury	Yuki (Lead)/Others	39 Episodes
2014	Beyraiderz	Atsushi (Guest Lead)/Others	3 Episodes
2014	Gus from Space!	Gus (Lead)	In-house pilot
2014–17	Fangbone!	Fangbone (Lead)/Others	26 episodes/Other Media/Theme Song Writer
2015–17	The Stanley Dynamic	Luke Stanley (Lead)	52 episodes/Other Media
2015–17	Super Planet Dolan	Various Characters	10 webisodes/12+ Songs
2015	Bob! The Slob	Jonas (Lead)	4 episodes
2016–17	George of the Jungle	Cuspid (Supporting)/Others	14 Episodes/Other Media
2016	Looped	Mel (Guest Lead)/Others	2 episodes
2017	3 Amigonauts	Nosh/Alien Trucker	2 Episodes
2018–20	Top Wing	Rocco/Chomps	12 episodes, recurring roles. Chomps in season 1, then Rocco in season 2
2019	The Cat In The Hat Knows A Lot About That!	Tagaloop	1 Episode (Guest Lead)
2019	Lootbag	Zander (lead)	In-house pilot
2019–20	Treehouse Toon Bops	Various characters	Various shorts
2019–21	D.N. Ace	Huxley Plunderman/Ezekiel Plunderman/Cobratot/Others	35 episodes/other media. Main voice role, supporting roles
2019–21	Norman Picklestripes	Gopher 1	Recurring role; 23 episodes with Bryn McAuley as Gopher 2. Frequent background harmonies as well.
2020	Intergalactic Funk Knights	Battlecat (lead)	In-house pilot
2020	Total Dramarama	Wendel	1 episode (Guest star)
2021–22	Super Wish	Various characters	Also, songwriter and producer for "The Very Best Gift" and "Apple Dance"
2023, 2026–present	Super Why's Comic Book Adventures	Outta Space, Sheena Sheep	16 episodes
2023–24	Bakugan Battle Brawlers	Pen-G/Lil' Jasper/Function/various others	Various episodes
2024	Blue's Clues & You!	Various characters	1 episode
