= Canadian Reflections =

- Genre: Short film
- Country of origin: Canada
- Original language: English
- No. of seasons: 33

Production
- Running time: 30 minutes

Original release
- Network: CBC Television
- Release: 10 June 1978

Canadian Reflections is a Canadian independent short film television series that began on CBC Television in 1978.

== Premise ==
This series features independent Canadian short films of various styles and topics, including both original works and theatrical short films that have previously screened on the film festival circuit. In the early years, the films were compiled by Athan Katsos.

== Scheduling ==
As of November 2023, this half-hour series is broadcast on Thursdays at midnight, or 12:30 a.m. Newfoundland time. It has aired in various time slots since its debut on 10 June 1978. In its initial years, it was broadcast weekly in mid-year between television seasons. In 1982, it was broadcast one to five times per week, normally on weekday afternoons.
