= Pilot (The Playboy Club) =

- The Playboy Club episode
- Dalton comes to the aid of Maureen.
- Episode no.: Season 1 Episode 1
- Directed by: Alan Taylor
- Written by: Chad Hodge; Becky Mode
- Original air date: September 19, 2011

Guest appearance
- Hugh Hefner as himself

Episode chronology
← Previous —	Next → "The Scarlet Bunny"

The pilot episode of the American historical fiction television series The Playboy Club premiered on September 19, 2011 in the United States on NBC. It was directed by Alan Taylor and written by Chad Hodge and Becky Mode. In this episode, Maureen, a newly hired Playboy bunny, gets involved in the murder of mob boss Bruno Bianchi. Nick Dalton, one of Chicago's top attorneys and Club key-holder, comes to her aid; his girlfriend Carol-Lynne makes an ambitious move and becomes the first Bunny Mother. Meanwhile, Bunnies Janie, Alice and Brenda each deal with their own personal issues and secrets while the club's general manager Billy Rosen tries his best to keep the club running without interference from the mob.

Development for a pilot episode began in 2010, when 20th Century Fox Television and Imagine TV attempted to produce the concept in time for the 2010–11 television season; however, it never materialized. Its scripts were picked up by NBC in January 2011 and two months afterwards, principal photography for the episode commenced in Chicago, Illinois, where it occurred over a period of nine days. The pilot episode was heavily advertised in the weeks leading up to its premiere, as the show's producers collaborated with several companies such as Bloomingdale's to initiate cross-promotional advertising deals.

Television critics were generally unimpressed with the episode, with many expressing that it was dull and mediocre. Upon airing, the series premiere was viewed by 5.02 million viewers and was viewed by four percent of the audience in the 18-49 demographic, according to Nielsen ratings.

== Plot ==
Nick Dalton, an attorney and key-holder for the Playboy Club, introduces himself to newly hired Bunny Maureen and asks her for cigarettes. Maureen notifies to him that she is out of cigarettes, and goes to the storeroom to resupply. Bruno Bianchi, who previously tried to dance with her, is at the premises and attempts to seduce her. A terrified Maureen begins to resist his attempts; the two later get into a scuffle. Dalton—checking on his order—witnesses the attack and gets into an altercation with Bianchi. Maureen stabs Bruno Bianchi in the neck with the heel of her shoes, killing him. Nick Dalton later informs her that Bianchi is the head of a local chapter of the Chicago Outfit. They dispose of his body in the Chicago River, and Dalton provides refuge for Maureen at his condominium.

Dalton prompts Maureen to hide in a closet, after hearing her fellow Bunny Carol-Lynne entering his condo. The couple begins to flirt and kiss, only to abruptly end after Carol-Lynne discovers a bunny outfit of a coworker. Infuriated, she ends her relationship with Dalton and calls for her things; she finds Maureen hiding in her closet. Carol-Lynne immediately leaves Dalton's condo, and Maureen returns to the Playboy Mansion with her coworkers. The following day, the club's manager Billy Rosen, speaks with the Bunnies regarding the whereabouts of Bianchi. Rosen later finds Carol-Lynne in his office, much to his surprise. He fires her, after finding out that she has been stealing records of the workers. Meanwhile, Nick Dalton meets up with John Bianchi, the son of the deceased Bruno Bianchi.

Carol-Lynne is rehired as Bunny Mother of the Playboy Club by Hugh Hefner. She discusses issues with Maureen in her office, and overtly attempts to persuade her to leave Chicago. After being told of a new training program, Maureen proceeds into the changing room, only to be confronted by a member of the Chicago Outfit. She tells Nick Dalton of the situation, and Dalton insists that he will come to her aid. Once entering in the car, Dalton discusses with John Bianchi on finding the murderer of his father. Meanwhile, all of the Bunnies aside from Alice—who appears as a meeting for the homophile group Mattachine Society—go to an event at the Playboy Mansion.

== Production ==
=== Conception ===
20th Century Fox Television and Imagine TV were the production companies for the show that eventually became The Playboy Club. They had previously attempted to produce the concept during the 2010–11 television season but the project never came to fruition. After that initial attempt, the companies approached screenwriter Chad Hodge, who became the show's creator and an executive producer. Imagine co-founder Brian Grazer and president Francie Calfo also served as executive producers, as did Richard Rosenzweig, a longtime executive and consultant with Playboy Enterprises. Alta Loma Entertainment, Playboy's entertainment production arm, received copies of all the story outlines and scripts for review but, according to Hodge, took a very hands-off approach and did not get heavily involved in the creative process. Likewise, Playboy Enterprises founder Hugh Hefner reviewed each of the scripts personally, but did not provide much direct input or request major changes. The original title of the series was Bunny Tales, then Playboy, before the final title The Playboy Club was chosen. The show's pilot script was the first new drama series ordered by NBC for the 2011–12 television season.

=== Casting ===
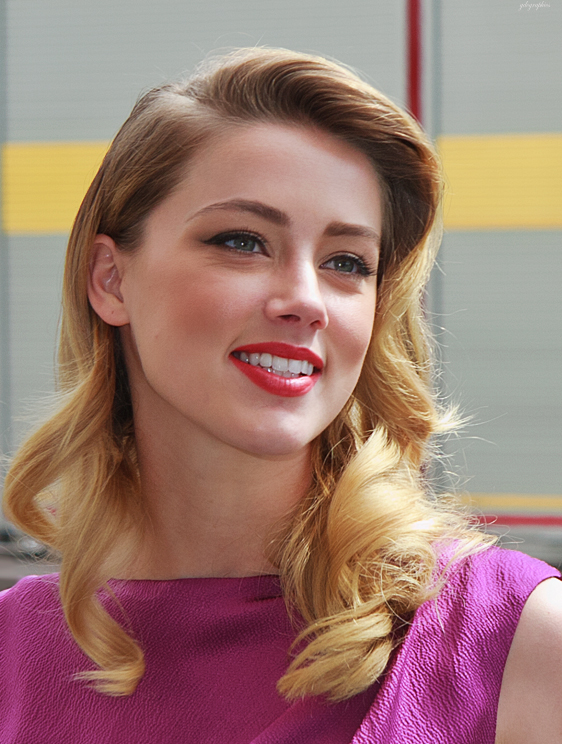
Producers approached Amber Heard for the role of Bunny Maureen.

The main cast includes Eddie Cibrian, who was cast as Nick Dalton, the central character in the series. In an interview with The Hollywood Reporter, Cibrian stated that Dalton was a "chameleon" and very charismatic. He continued: "On the facade, he seems to have it all. He's very successful. He's dating the head Playboy bunny. He's one of the first keyholders at the Playboy Club, but he has a very mysterious past." Jeff Hephner was originally approached for the role after performing well in test auditions, but Hephner had no prior experience playing a television lead before, and the producers decided to let him go after the full cast table. Cibrian was cast just a few days before filming began. Amber Heard was approached by producers of the show to portray Bunny Maureen. Although the series premiere started with Nick helping Maureen out of a difficult situation, Heard said of the character, "Don't underestimate that character and her intelligence, and the journey that she's going to take to really rise above that. [...] I think Maureen allows herself to be helped when she needs it, and by no means relies on any character, male or female, in this story, and never has."

Producers of the show cast Naturi Naughton as Bunny Brenda. Naughton auditioned four times for the role before getting cast, singing the Nat King Cole song "When I Fall in Love" during one of the auditions. In researching the role, Naughton consulted the black former Playboy Bunny Pat Lacey, watched the documentary film The Bunny Years (1999) and read the book 50 Years of the Playboy Bunny. Brenda was loosely based on the model Jennifer Jackson, the actual first Black "Playmate of the Month", although neither Naughton nor the Playboy Club producers contacted Jackson in preparing the role. Providing the role of the manager of the Playboy Club, Billy Rosen, David Krumholtz exclaimed that he was drawn to the character and wished to play a role different from Charlie Eppes, the character he played for six seasons on the crime drama Numb3rs. Other members of the main cast include Jenna Dewan, Laura Benanti, Leah Renee, Wes Ramsey, and Sean Maher. Hugh Hefner performed a brief voice-over narration during the pilot episode.

=== Development ===
Principal photography for the episode took place in Chicago, Illinois, the same city where the story was set. Filming on the pilot episode began on March 15, 2011, with most scenes filmed on a set at Cinespace Studios on West 16th Street. Some scenes were also shot at the former Meigs Field on Northerly Island.

The pilot episode was heavily promoted in the weeks leading up to its airing. Laura Benanti appeared on a retro style cover of Playboy magazine released on September 16, 2011. The magazine had a 1961 theme, which included an old-fashioned visual style, photos of 1960s Playboy bunnies and clubs, and the same sixty cent price as that time period. Benanti wore a black bunny costume and held a tray with drinks on the cover photo. NBC also entered into a cross-promotional deal with the Bloomingdale's department store. The Walton Street store in Chicago included display windows inspired by the series, which were unveiled in September 2011 by Benanti, as well as Naturi Naughton and Wes Ramsey. Chosen for the storefronts due to its close proximity to the original Playboy Club, the Walton Street store allowed visitors to take virtual photos with the show's stars, view photos of the real-life clubs and the show's set, and enter into a contest to win such prizes as a walk-on role on the show and a $5,000 Bloomingdale's shopping spree.

== Reception ==
=== Ratings ===
The series premiere of The Playboy Club was initially broadcast on September 19, 2011 in the United States on NBC. It was watched by 5.02 million viewers, despite airing simultaneously with Hawaii Five-0 on CBS and Castle on ABC. That was the lowest viewership among the major networks in its 10 p.m. timeslot, with Castle drawing 13.28 million households and Hawaii Five-0 attaining 12.19 million households. The episode gradually shed viewers from the first half to the next, with an average of 5.36 million households tuning in for the first half-hour and an average of 4.69 million households for the second. The debut earned a 1.6 rating/4 share among viewers in the 18-49 demographic, according to the Nielson ratings, indicating it was viewed by four percent of those in the demographic who were actively watching television during the broadcast, which represented 1.6 percent of the total demographic. This was considered a disappointing result for a coveted demographic. Speculations regarding the possible cancelation of the series immediately surfaced, but NBC officials told Deadline Hollywood that such a decision would not be rushed because NBC Chairman Bob Greenblatt wanted to send a message that the network was willing to give all their new shows the necessary time to find an audience and succeed. Similarly in Canada, the pilot episode was viewed by 485,000 viewers.

=== Critical response ===
The musical numbers provide some pleasure, but the one reason to watch the show is Ms. Benanti, who has the skill to make the soft-boiled tough-guy dialogue work and who often seems to be the only adult on screen. She's paired with Eddie Cibrian as a former mob lawyer [...] His interestingly thuggish face is a good fit for the period, but he's awfully lightweight for a guy who has to dispose of a body in the first 10 minutes of the pilot.

— Mike Hale, of the New York Times

Critics were generally unimpressed with the series premiere. Mike Hale of the New York Times critically panned the episode, writing, "An interesting drama could be made about Mr. Hefner's success in fusing sex, privilege and pseudo-cool into a wildly successful commercial empire during a conservative time, but The Playboy Club sets out to do much less, and succeeds." Similarly, Seth Amitin of IGN gave the episode a 4.5 out of ten, signifying a "bad" rating. Amitin stated that he was disappointed with its delivery, opining that while there were some potential in the show, it would "take a lot more work to get this show off the ground." Meredith Blake of The A.V. Club reacted mildly to the episode, expressing that it was "glossy" but dull and mediocre. Fellow writer Phil Nugent echoed similar sentiments, writing, "The only outrageous thing about The Playboy Club is the scale of its miscalculated reverence for the sanctimonious mythology it's trying to peddle." In conclusion, Blake and Nugent gave the episode a 'C' grade.

NPR writer Linda Holmes challenged the show's assertions of female empowerment. Finding the episode itself "silly and full of bad dialogue" and "cheesy more than offensive", Holmes questioned how a series about women whose conduct and appearance were micromanaged could simultaneously claim that those regimented women were uniformly empowered by the experience. She opined that "you can shake a Bunny tail and be empowered, no argument. It depends on what's going on in the rest of your life. But shaking a Bunny tail isn't enough to demonstrate empowerment if you have to go to Eddie Cibrian or Hugh Hefner for help every time you have a problem, and having the right not to be slapped on the behind when you deliver a cocktail isn't exactly a societal advance on the order of universal suffrage." The series, she concluded, might have been better served had those involved positioned it as a camp soap opera and not tried to make a feminist statement. In concurrence, Nancy Franklin of The New Yorker criticized Hefner's narration, deeming it as delusional and stupid, and criticize the series for its stance on feminism. She wrote, "The show wants things both ways: to glamorize the Playboy 'lifestyle' from a male point of view and also to try to persuade us that, although Bunnydom had its hardships and rigors—no gum chewing, constant smiling—wearing an uncomfortable skimpy uniform and putting a poufy fake tail on your butt meant you held the keys to the universe." Television Blend's Kelly West was much more optimistic about the episode, and asserted that "The Playboy Club offers a lot of shiny things to look at, but beyond that, there is a story beginning to develop and characters that, while not quite as original as they are nice to look at, are interesting and charismatic enough to carry the series." Tim Goodman of The Hollywood Reporter said the Playboy brand and the lifestyle portrayed in the series was dated and uninteresting, calling it a "bad show, period. The writing was weak, the acting spotty and the sexism too ridiculous and obvious to comment on more than once." Alan Pergament, former critic for The Buffalo News, said of the show that "the truth is [The Playboy Club] should have been a pay-cable series because without the sex it is pretty boring and tame."

Several critics drew comparison to the television series Mad Men. Entertainment Weekly writer Margaret Lyons opined that the episode blatantly mimicked the show's style, and called Eddie Cibrian's performance an imitation of Jon Hamm's Don Draper and even citing specific shots and camera angles similar to those in Mad Men. Lyons wrote, "[The Playboy Club] can't copy the lyricism or narrative potency that make Mad Men what it is, which is more than a collection of artfully arranged period hairdos and moody pairs of people in front of rectangle-patterned backgrounds. [But] it's sure trying!" TVLine's Matt Webb Mitovich felt that despite evoking an accurate depiction of the 1960s, it did not succeed as well as Mad Men. He felt the series was too claustrophobic and that Cibrian was not strong enough for his part.
