= The Darkest Minds =

2018 film by Jennifer Yuh Nelson

- Theatrical release poster
- Directed by: Jennifer Yuh Nelson
- Written by: Chad Hodge
- Based on: The Darkest Minds; 2012 novels by Alexandra Bracken
- Produced by: Shawn Levy; Dan Levine
- Starring: Amandla Stenberg; Harris Dickinson; Mandy Moore; Patrick Gibson; Skylan Brooks; Miya Cech; Bradley Whitford; Gwendoline Christie
- Cinematography: Kramer Morgenthau
- Edited by: Maryann Brandon; Dean Zimmerman
- Music by: Benjamin Wallfisch
- Production company: 21 Laps Entertainment
- Distributed by: 20th Century Fox
- Release date: August 3, 2018 (United States)
- Running time: 104 minutes
- Country: United States
- Language: English
- Budget: $34 million
- Box office: $41.1 million

The Darkest Minds is a 2018 American dystopian science fiction film directed by Jennifer Yuh Nelson (in her live action feature length directorial debut), written by Chad Hodge and produced by Shawn Levy and Dan Levine. The film stars Amandla Stenberg, Harris Dickinson, Mandy Moore and Gwendoline Christie. Based on Alexandra Bracken's 2012 young adult novel of the same name, it follows a group of children who are on the run from the government after obtaining superpowers due to a mysterious infection.

On September 15, 2014, it was announced that 20th Century Fox had bought the rights to the novel and that Levy would produce the film through his 21 Laps Entertainment production company. Stenberg was cast two years later on September 26, 2016, and principal photography began in April 2017 in Atlanta, Georgia.

The Darkest Minds was released in the United States on August 3, 2018. It received negative reviews from critics and was a box-office bomb.

== Plot ==
In a dystopian future, a plague (called Idiopathic Adolescent Acute Neurodegeneration) kills nearly 90 percent of the children in the United States. Those who survive develop superpowers. They are classified by color: Green (increased intelligence), Blue (telekinesis), Yellow (can manipulate electricity), Red (pyrokinesis), and Orange (telepathy and mind control). Children who are Orange are considered so dangerous they are murdered by the government. The rest are confined to camps. Those who are red are placed in dedicated camps where they are tortured and brainwashed into becoming a personal army for the President.

Ruby Daly is an Orange, but she touches the doctor who is classifying her and puts the thought in his head that she is a Green and she is placed in a camp. Six years later, a resistance group called the Children's League helps her escape from the camps. Cate, a worker at the camp, gives Ruby a panic button that can be activated as a tracker if she is in danger. While touching Rob, another League member, Ruby becomes suspicious of their intentions. She escapes the League with a mute girl named Suzume (Zu), a Yellow. Zu takes Ruby to Liam, a Blue, and his friend Charles (Chubs), a Green. The three agree to let Ruby join them as they try to make their way to "East River," a purported safe haven led by an Orange named the "Slip Kid."

In an abandoned mall, they cross paths with another group of survivors. The others know where East River is, but the only clue they reveal — due to the subtle influence of Ruby's power — are the letters "E.D.O.". Chubs eventually deduces that this is a radio frequency, which reveals a transmission that East River is in Lake Prince, Virginia.

The group surprises Ruby by telling her they're taking her to her former home in Salem, Virginia hoping she can reconcile with her parents. Seeing them through the glass door, she realizes she made them forget her and runs away. She meets up with Liam, who comforts her. They begin to develop a romantic connection, but Ruby refuses to touch him, fearing her powers will hurt him. Lady Jane has captured Chubs and Zu, and then she ambushes Ruby and Liam, but Ruby overpowers Lady Jane so that they can escape, revealing her Orange identity to the group. The group ditches their van after a small misunderstanding and then successfully walk to the safe haven in East River.

At East River, Slip Kid is revealed to be the president's son, Clancy Gray. He teaches Ruby how to control her powers, and eventually convinces Ruby to help him figure out how to erase people's memories when she asks for a homesick Chubs to use the computer to contact his parents. During this process, Clancy controls her mind and tries to kiss her.

It is revealed that Clancy is using his powers to control the government, and wants to use his new memory-erasing powers to turn Ruby to his side and forget her friends, but she manages to escape with the others. Liam flees with all of the haven children, while Ruby faces off against Clancy, destroying the camp and making her escape with Chubs. Chubs is severely injured, leaving Ruby no choice but to use her panic button to call the League for help.

The League gets Chubs to a hospital and lets Zu leave with a protective family. Ruby convinces Cate to release Liam in return for taking his place as a soldier in the League. Knowing that Liam will never leave without her, Ruby kisses him and erases all of his memories of herself. Liam leaves the camp, while Ruby begins her training with her fellow powered children in the League. Elsewhere, Clancy looks over the US Army and government forces.

== Cast ==
- Amandla Stenberg as Ruby Daly
  - Lidya Jewett as 10 year old Ruby
- Harris Dickinson as Liam Stewart
- Mandy Moore as Dr. Catherine "Cate" Connor
- Patrick Gibson as Clancy Gray
- Skylan Brooks as Charles "Chubs" Meriwether
- Miya Cech as Suzume "Zu" Kimura
- Bradley Whitford as President Gray
- Gwendoline Christie as Lady Jane
- Wade Williams as Captain McManus
- Mark O'Brien as Rob
- Wallace Langham as Dr. Viceroy
- Golden Brooks as Molly Daly
- Sammi Rotibi as Paul Daly

== Production ==
On September 15, 2014, it was announced that 20th Century Fox had bought the film rights to Alexandra Bracken's young adult novel The Darkest Minds, the first book in her The Darkest Minds series. Shawn Levy would produce the film along with Dan Levine and Dan Cohen through his 21 Laps Entertainment, while the television writer Chad Hodge was hired to write the adaptation. On July 12, 2016, it was reported that animation director Jennifer Yuh Nelson had been hired to direct the film, and it would be her first live-action project.

=== Casting ===
On September 26, 2016, Amandla Stenberg joined the film to play the lead role of Ruby Daly. On January 17, 2017, it was reported that newcomer Harris Dickinson had signed on to play Liam. In February 2017, Miya Cech was cast as Zu in her film debut, and Skylan Brooks was cast as Chubs. In March 2017, Mandy Moore was cast to play Cate, a doctor and member of an organization who is fighting against the government, and Patrick Gibson was cast as Clancy Gray. Gwendoline Christie was also cast in the film to play a bounty hunter of teens who escape from the camp. In April 2017, Golden Brooks joined the film to play Ruby's mother.

=== Filming ===
Principal photography on the film began in April 2017 in Atlanta, Georgia.

=== Music ===
Benjamin Wallfisch composed the score for the film. The soundtrack was released by Milan Records.

== Reception ==
=== Box office ===
The Darkest Minds has grossed $12.7 million in the United States and Canada, and $28.4 million in other territories, for a total worldwide gross of $41.1 million, against a production budget of $34 million.

In the United States and Canada, The Darkest Minds was released on August 3, 2018, alongside Christopher Robin, The Spy Who Dumped Me and Death of a Nation: Can We Save America a Second Time?, and was originally projected to gross around $10 million from 3,127 theaters in its opening weekend. However, after grossing $2.3 million on its first day, including $550,000 from Thursday night previews, weekend estimates were lowered to $6 million. It went on to debut $5.8 million, finishing eighth at the box office and marking the 12th worst opening for a film playing in over 3,000 theaters. It dropped 64% to $2.1 million in its second weekend, finishing 12th.

In its third weekend, the film grossed $255,173 and was pulled from 2,679 theaters (85.6 percent, 3,127 to 448), marking the largest third-weekend theater drop in history.

=== Critical response ===
The film received negative reviews. On Rotten Tomatoes, the film holds an approval rating of 15% based on 140 reviews, with an average rating of 4.1/10. The website's critical consensus reads, "The Darkest Minds does little to differentiate itself in a crowded field of YA adaptations, leaving all but the least demanding viewers feeling dystopian déjà vu." On Metacritic, the film has a weighted average score of 39 out of 100, based on reviews from 28 critics, indicating "generally unfavorable reviews". Audiences polled by CinemaScore gave the film an average grade of "B" on an A+ to F scale.

A.A. Dowd of The A.V. Club called the film "a formulaic hodgepodge of secondhand plot points" and "an insult to its target demographic" of teen moviegoers. William Bibbiani of TheWrap praised the film and the cast, but concedes "it's not quite thrilling enough [...] so it plays a bit more like a manifesto than a sci-fi thriller." Monica Castillo of RogerEbert.com wrote that while the film has a "promising start", it "ultimately doesn’t quite deliver."

== Future ==
The Darkest Minds is based on the first of four novels, three novellas and three short stories in The Darkest Minds series, and the film's ending sets the stage for future action. Director Jennifer Yuh Nelson has stated that she would be happy to return for a second film in the series, although no definitive plans have been announced. However, reports indicate that sequels are unlikely, given the poor critical and box office performance of the film.
