= Chad Hodge =

American television writer and producer

Chad Hodge (born 1977) is an American writer and producer who created drama series Runaway (2006), The Playboy Club (2011), Wayward Pines (2015), and Good Behavior (2016). He wrote the Broadway stage adaptation of Irving Berlin's classic musical Holiday Inn and the film adaptation of YA trilogy The Darkest Minds (2018). He is a native of Highland Park, Illinois, and attended Northwestern University.

== Early life ==
Hodge was born in Kansas City, Missouri, and grew up in Highland Park, Illinois, as the oldest of five siblings. He was interested in the arts from an early age, starting with theater. At five years old, his first performance was in a local production of The King & I. While attending Highland Park High School, he played leading roles in Little Shop of Horrors (Seymour), Pippin (Leading Player), and Godspell (Jesus). In the summer of 1994, Hodge attended the NHSI Cherubs theater program at Northwestern University.

Hodge then attended Northwestern University and decided to pursue different avenues in the arts. Among several extracurriculars, he was the executive producer of campus television series University Place. In 1999, he graduated with magna cum laude honors and a bachelor's degree in communication studies and business institutions.

While at Northwestern, Hodge explored his interests through various internships, including Deloitte Consulting and The Oprah Winfrey Show in Chicago, and casting director Debra Zane in Los Angeles. While interning for Zane in the summer of 1998, Hodge read the screenplay for American Beauty by Alan Ball, which Zane was casting. Hodge has said the script inspired him to want to become a screenwriter.

Hodge's youngest sister Amy Hodge is also in the entertainment industry. She is VP of Original Programming at HBO.

== Career ==
After graduating from Northwestern, Hodge was an assistant at the William Morris Agency. He quit after three weeks when he realized he had no time to write. He got a job as a waiter and wrote whenever he could.

In 2001, he was hired by NBC to write a television pilot for their Saturday morning teen block as a vehicle for rising country music star Alecia Elliott. The show, All About Us, started airing in late 2001.

In 2003, Hodge segued to writing for primetime television drama, and wrote for several series including Veritas: The Quest (ABC) and Tru Calling (FOX). He also wrote the movie This Time Around for ABC Family.

In 2004, Hodge wrote the movie I Want to Marry Ryan Banks, starring Bradley Cooper, for ABC Family. The film is now available under the title The Reality of Love.

In 2006, Hodge created his first primetime drama series, Runaway (CW), starring Donnie Wahlberg, Leslie Hope, Dustin Milligan, and Sarah Ramos. It was the first drama series launched by The CW.

In 2011, Hodge created The Playboy Club (NBC) about the first Playboy Club in Chicago in the 1960s. The pilot was directed by Alan Taylor. The show starred Laura Benanti, Amber Heard, Jenna Dewan, Leah Renee, Naturi Naughton, Eddie Cibrian, David Krumholtz, and Jenifer Lewis.

Also in 2011, Out Magazine named Hodge one of the "Out 100" in their annual list of the most influential LGBTQ public figures.

In 2015, Hodge created Wayward Pines (FOX) based on the best-selling novel by Blake Crouch. The event series starred Matt Dillon, Terrence Howard, and Melissa Leo. The series was meant to be just ten episodes, but it performed very well and FOX ordered a second season. Hodge, however, had moved on to create another series with Blake Crouch, Good Behavior, based on Crouch's short story "The Pain of Others."

In 2016, Hodge created Good Behavior (TNT) starring Michelle Dockery and Juan Diego Botto. The show was critically well-received and aired for two seasons. Hodge was nominated for the 2018 Writers Guild of America Award for Best Dramatic Writing for the episode "The Heart Attack is the Best Way."

In 2017, Hodge returned to his theatrical roots as co-book writer for the musical stage adaptation of Holiday Inn, the 1942 Universal film starring Bing Crosby and Fred Astaire. The musical had its first production at the Goodspeed Opera House in Connecticut before opening on Broadway at the Roundabout Theatre.

In 2018, Hodge wrote the screenplay for feature film The Darkest Minds (20th Century Fox) based on the New York Times bestselling novel by Alexandra Bracken. The film starred Amandla Stenberg and Harris Dickinson.

Hodge wrote and executive-produced Netflix's first gay holiday rom-com, Single All the Way, which premiered on the platform in December 2021. The plot follows Peter who, desperate to avoid his family's judgment about his perpetual single status, convinces his best friend Nick to join him for the holidays and pretend they're now in a relationship. But their plan goes awry when his family decides to play matchmaker. The film was directed by Michael Mayer with principal photography taking place in Montreal, Canada. The cast includes Michael Urie, Philemon Chambers, Luke Macfarlane, Jennifer Coolidge, Jennifer Robertson, and Kathy Najimy.

== Filmography ==
=== Film ===
Year	Title	Director	Writer
2018	The Darkest Minds	No	Yes
2021	Single All the Way	No	Yes
TBA	Famous	No	Yes

=== Television ===
The numbers in writing credits refer to the number of episodes.

Year	Title	Creator	Writer	Executive producer	Network	Notes
1998	University Place	No	Yes	co-executive		unknown episodes
2001	All About Us	developer	Yes (2)	No	NBC	
2003	This Time Around	—N/a	Yes	No	ABC Family	TV movie
2003-2004	Tru Calling	No	Yes (2)	No	Fox	
2004	I Want to Marry Ryan Banks	—N/a	Yes	No	ABC	TV movie
2004	Veritas: The Quest	No	Yes (1)	No	ABC	
2006	Runaway	Yes	Yes (4)	Yes	The CW	
2011	The Playboy Club	Yes	Yes (2)	Yes	NBC	
2015-2016	Wayward Pines	developer	Yes (5)	Yes	Fox	
2016-2018	Good Behavior	Yes	Yes (7)	Yes	TNT	Nominated – Writers Guild of America Award for Television: Episodic Drama, episode: "The Heart Attack is the Best Way"
TBA	Tomb Raider	showrunner	Yes	Yes	Amazon Prime Video	

== Musical theatre ==
Year	Title	Role	Notes
2017	Holiday Inn: The New Irving Berlin Musical	writer	live stage production Nominated - Outer Critics Circle Award for Outstanding New Broadway Musical
