= The Playboy Club =

American television series

- Promotional image
- Genre: Historical fiction; Crime drama
- Created by: Chad Hodge
- Starring: Eddie Cibrian; Laura Benanti; Amber Heard; Jenna Dewan; Naturi Naughton; Leah Renee; Wes Ramsey; Jenifer Lewis; David Krumholtz
- Opening theme: "Walk Like a Man"
- Composer: Terry Dexter
- Country of origin: United States
- Original language: English
- No. of seasons: 1
- No. of episodes: 7 (4 unaired)

Production
- Executive producers: Chad Hodge; Brian Grazer; Francie Calfo
- Running time: 60 minutes
- Production companies: 20th Century Fox Television; Imagine Television; Storyland Entertainment; Alta Loma Entertainment

Original release
- Network: NBC
- Release: September 19 – October 3, 2011

The Playboy Club is an American historical crime drama television series that aired on NBC from September 19 to October 3, 2011. Set in 1961, the series centers on the employees (known as Bunnies) of the original Playboy Club operating in Chicago. The Playboy Club stars Eddie Cibrian, Laura Benanti, Amber Heard, Jenna Dewan, Naturi Naughton, Leah Renee, Wes Ramsey, Jenifer Lewis, and David Krumholtz.

The Playboy Club was canceled on October 4, 2011, after three episodes aired, due to its low ratings. It was the first cancellation of the 2011–12 television season. NBC continued to film the series until October 10, 2011, hoping to sell the series to another network.

When production wrapped on October 10, 2011, Chad Hodge (the show's creator and executive producer) and Benanti both tweeted that they had finished seven episodes, including the pilot. Benanti further stated that the seventh episode has two endings, one of which is more final to the series.

== Cast and characters ==
=== Main ===
- Eddie Cibrian as Nick Dalton, a smooth high-powered attorney and Playboy Club key-holder who plans to run for state's attorney, but also harbors secret connections to organized crime. Jeff Hephner was originally cast in the role after performing well in test auditions, but the actor had no experience playing a television lead before, and the producers decided to let him go after the full cast table. Cibrian, who was cast just a few days before filming began, commuted from his Los Angeles home to the set in Chicago for filming.
- Laura Benanti as Bunny Mother Carol-Lynne. The original Playboy Bunny, Carol-Lynne is romantically involved with Nick.

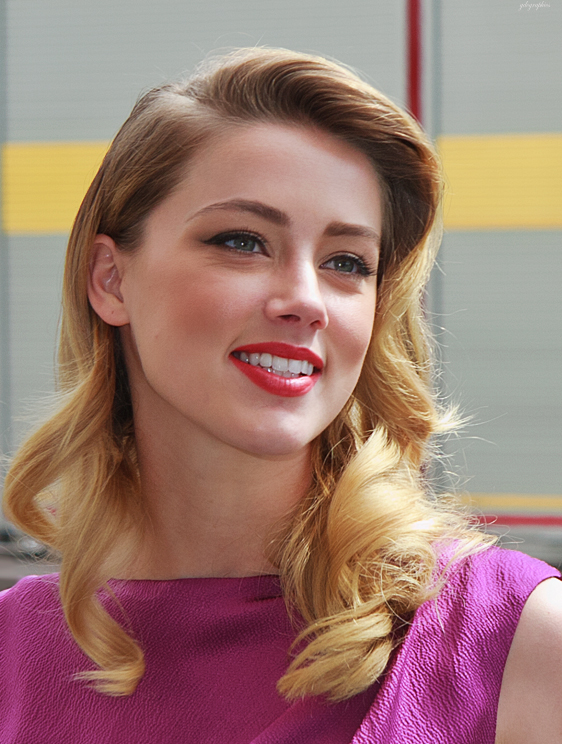
Amber Heard played Playboy Bunny Maureen, one of the leading roles in The Playboy Club.

- Amber Heard as Bunny Maureen, a recently hired Playboy Bunny who is innocent and naive to the ways of the city, yet is running from mysterious and unexplained things in her dark past. Although the series premiere started with Nick helping Maureen out of a difficult situation, Heard said of the character, "Don't underestimate that character and her intelligence, and the journey that she's going to take to really rise above that. ... I think Maureen allows herself to be helped when she needs it, and by no means relies on any character, male or female, in this story, and never has."
- Jenna Dewan Tatum as Bunny Janie, a very provocative Bunny who is dating Max the bartender. She loves Max but cannot marry him because she is already married, although separated from her husband.
- Naturi Naughton as Bunny Brenda, who is seeking to be the first African American Playboy Playmate. Naughton auditioned four times for the role before getting cast, singing the Nat King Cole song "When I Fall in Love" during one of the auditions. In researching the role, Naughton consulted the black former Playboy Bunny Pat Lacey, watched the documentary film The Bunny Years (1999) and read the book 50 Years of the Playboy Bunny. Naughton had previously played a Playboy Bunny in "Hands and Knees", a fourth season episode of Mad Men, an AMC period drama also set in the 1960s.
- Leah Renee as Bunny Alice, a Bunny who is secretly lesbian and in a marriage of convenience with a gay man. Both are members of the homophile group the Mattachine Society.
- Wes Ramsey as Max, a bartender at the Playboy Club.
- David Krumholtz as Billy Rosen, manager of the Playboy Club. Krumholtz said he was drawn to the character and wished to play a role different from Charlie Eppes, the character he played for six seasons on the crime drama Numbers.
- Jenifer Lewis as Pearl, the warm and well-loved Playboy Club seamstress who sews the outfits for the Playboy Bunnies, many of whom confide their secrets to her. Lewis, who described her character as the mother hen of the club, did not have to audition for the role, which is unusual in a dramatic television series. Lewis was a Broadway singer who performed with co-star Naturi Naughton on the musical Hairspray, and the Pearl character was expected to sing in an upcoming episode when a scheduled entertainer fell through. Pearl was based on a real-life Playboy Club seamstress named Betty.

The contracts for Cibrian, Heard, Dewan and Renee all included clauses authorizing nudity, an unprecedented stipulation for a network series. Under the agreement, the actors could not be forced to perform nude scenes, but if nudity were required for a particular scene, they would have to review the script and then be given the opportunity to agree or decline. Nude scenes were not planned for the NBC broadcast version of the show; rather, the clauses were intended to allow possible R-rated versions of the show to be filmed for the DVD release and for domestic and foreign cable syndication. However, shortly before the series debuted, executive producer Chad Hodge told The Hollywood Reporter that no nude scenes had been filmed for alternate versions of the show nor did he expect any such scenes to be filmed.

=== Guest ===
- Sean Maher as Sean Beasley, a closeted gay man in a lavender marriage with Alice. A secret member of the Mattachine Society, Sean is also a political campaigner who was to serve as Nick's campaign manager during a state's attorney run in later episodes. Maher was closeted before taking the role and he publicly came out as the show aired because he felt the series was a good platform to openly discuss his sexuality and encourage public discourse about the issue.
- Troy Garity as John Bianchi, the son of Bruno Bianchi, a mob figure who is killed by Maureen in self-defense.
- Cassidy Freeman as Frances Dunhill, a Chicago socialite who stands in as Nick Dalton's date as he makes a run for public office. The relationship with Nick is only for show, to please her father while concealing her lesbianism.

== Production ==
=== Development ===
20th Century Fox Television and Imagine Television had previously attempted to produce the concept of the series during the 2010–11 television season but the project never came to fruition. After that initial attempt, the companies approached screenwriter Chad Hodge, who became the show's creator and an executive producer. Imagine co-founder Brian Grazer and president Francie Calfo also served as executive producers, as did Richard Rosenzweig, a longtime executive and consultant with Playboy Enterprises. Alta Loma Entertainment, Playboy's entertainment production arm, received copies of all the story outlines and scripts for review but, according to Hodge, took a very hands-off approach and did not get heavily involved in the creative process. Likewise, Playboy Enterprises founder Hugh Hefner reviewed each of the scripts personally, but did not provide much direct input or request major changes. The original title of the series was Bunny Tales, then Playboy, before the final title The Playboy Club was chosen. The show's pilot script was the first new drama series ordered by NBC for the 2011–12 television season.

=== Writing ===
I think there was a perception that we were trying to do something politically ambitious or make a statement or make this a show about empowering women, which sounds super boring to me. That sounds like a documentary, which this certainly is not. This is more like Chicago, Moulin Rouge! and All That Jazz, Desperate Housewives. This is a fun, sexy soap.

— Chad Hodge

Chad Hodge said of writing the series, "When I set out to create this show, the first word out of my mouth was 'entertaining'", and cited as influences such films as All That Jazz (1979), Moulin Rouge! (2001) and Chicago (2002), and the comedy-drama television series Desperate Housewives. The characters and setting of The Playboy Club served as an exploration of the changing political and moral attitudes of the 1960s, particularly with the approach of the sexual revolution that began in that decade.

Members of the Playboy Club cast and crew have stated they believe the series, and the concept of the Playboy Bunny in general, is empowering to women. One of the show's taglines spoke to this theme: "The men have the keys, but the women hold all of the power." During a Television Critics Association press tour, Amber Heard discussed past Bunnies who had gone on to successful careers and did not regret their past experience working at Playboy clubs, including Lauren Hutton, Debbie Harry, Kimba Wood and Polly Matzinger. Heard said she believed the female characters in The Playboy Club were making free choices about their sexuality, and thus they were not being exploited, adding, "I think it's just as chauvinistic to deny a woman her sexuality." Naturi Naughton said she believed the women who worked as Playboy Bunnies were intelligent, self-reliant women who went to school, bought homes and accomplished things other women during their time could not. Likewise, Chad Hodge said he did not believe there was anything wrong with a woman using her sexuality to get what she wants if she so chooses, adding: "There are different brands of feminism and I don't think it should be boxed into any one version." Hodge later stressed, however, that despite his comments about the empowerment of women, he did not believe The Playboy Club conveyed any strong political convictions or intellectual ambitions, but rather was meant to be entertaining.

The subplot involving the Mattachine Society focuses specifically on the growing gay rights movement in the United States in the 1960s and what it was like to be gay or a lesbian during a time period that was still repressive of that culture. The Playboy Club also touched upon changing thoughts with regard to racial diversity during the 1960s. One of the supporting characters, Brenda, seeks to become the first African American Playboy Bunny. Her role in the series illustrates Hugh Hefner's decision to integrate his clubs, both by hiring black women and allowing black key-holders and performers, which was considered unusual at the time. Brenda was loosely based on the model Jennifer Jackson, the actual first Black Playmate of the Month, although neither Naughton nor the Playboy Club producers contacted Jackson in preparing the role.

=== Filming ===
The Playboy Club was shot in Chicago, the same city where the story was set. Filming on the pilot episode began on March 15, 2011, with most scenes filmed on a set at Cinespace Studios on West 16th Street. Some scenes were also shot at the former Meigs Field on Northerly Island. The Chicago Film Office estimated the production would add jobs to the city and pump an estimated $2 million into the local economy per episode. Each episode was shot in about nine days, and filming lasted for 12 hours at a time on certain days. The first episode was directed by Alan Taylor, who had also directed four episodes of Mad Men, including the pilot.

The costumes in The Playboy Club were designed by Isis Mussenden. She was not able to find any original Playboy Bunny uniforms, so she created her designs based on photos and consultations with Hugh Hefner. Each of the five female leads received two suits, each of which cost $3,000 and took about 10 hours to make. Each suit included a built-in bra, French cuffs with Playboy cuff links, satin ears and 3-inch heels. After the costumes were designed, Hefner had claimed they were not cut high enough on the leg, but Mussenden assured him the height was correct based on photos of Hefner with real-life bunnies. Naturi Naughton said the costumes were very tight and difficult to wear for several hours at a time during shoots.

While on the Playboy Club set, Amber Heard's sister used her iPhone to take a photo of Heard in her Playboy Bunny costume and Heard posted it on her Facebook page. The image was widely disseminated on the Internet and featured in the magazine TV Guide. 20th Century Fox Television banned any unauthorized photography on the set as a result of the incident.

Hugh Hefner performed a voice-over narration during the pilot episode, but no such narration was recorded for the other episodes. A young version of Hefner was featured as a character in the show, but was only ever seen from behind. Hodge said this was the result of a conscious decision to feature Hefner in the series but not give him a regular role, of which the real-life Hefner approved because, according to Hodge, "He didn't want to make it his story." On October 4, 2011, Eddie Cibrian injured himself on set after getting his right heel caught underneath a 200-pound steel door, resulting in a deep gash that required stitches.

=== Music ===
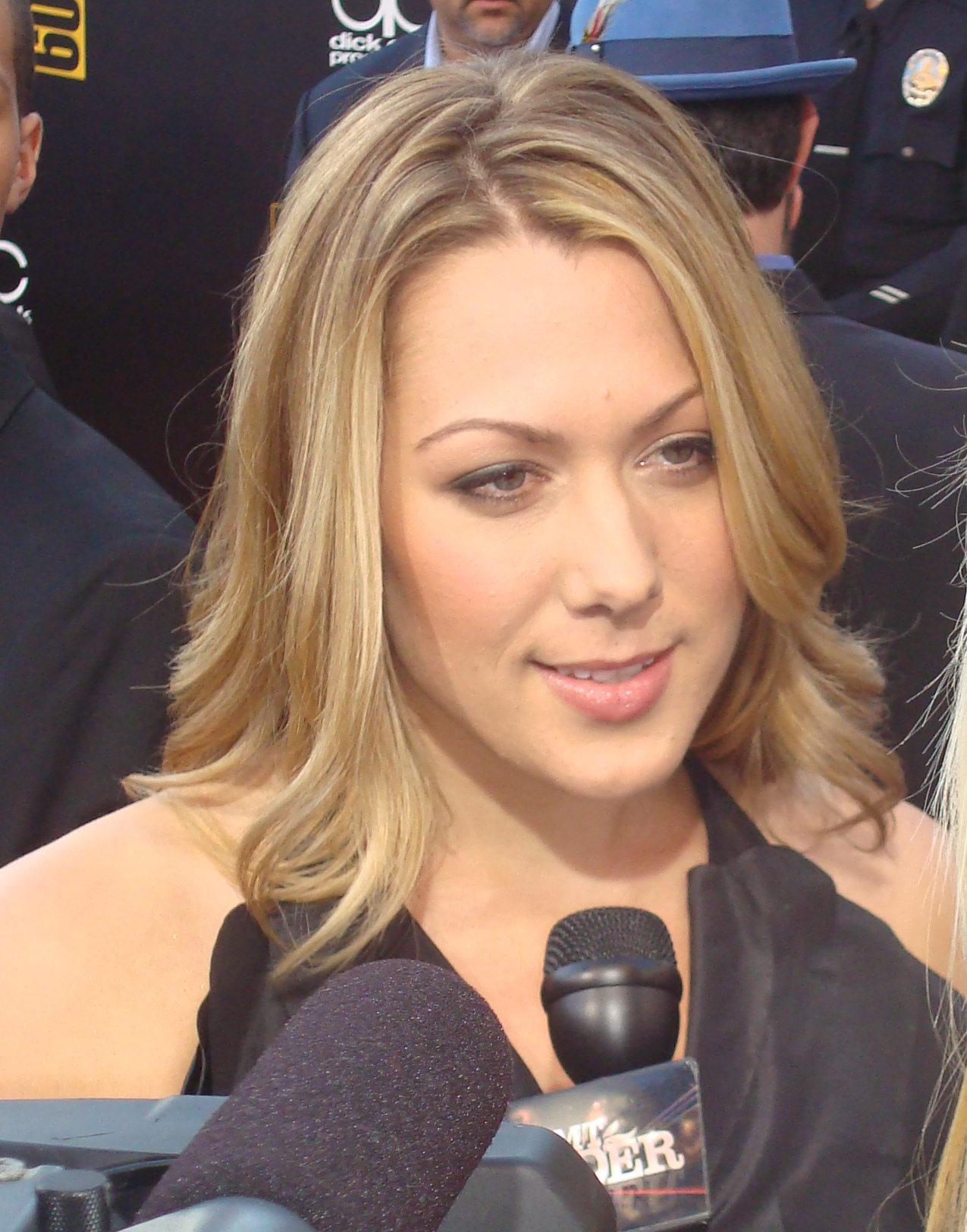
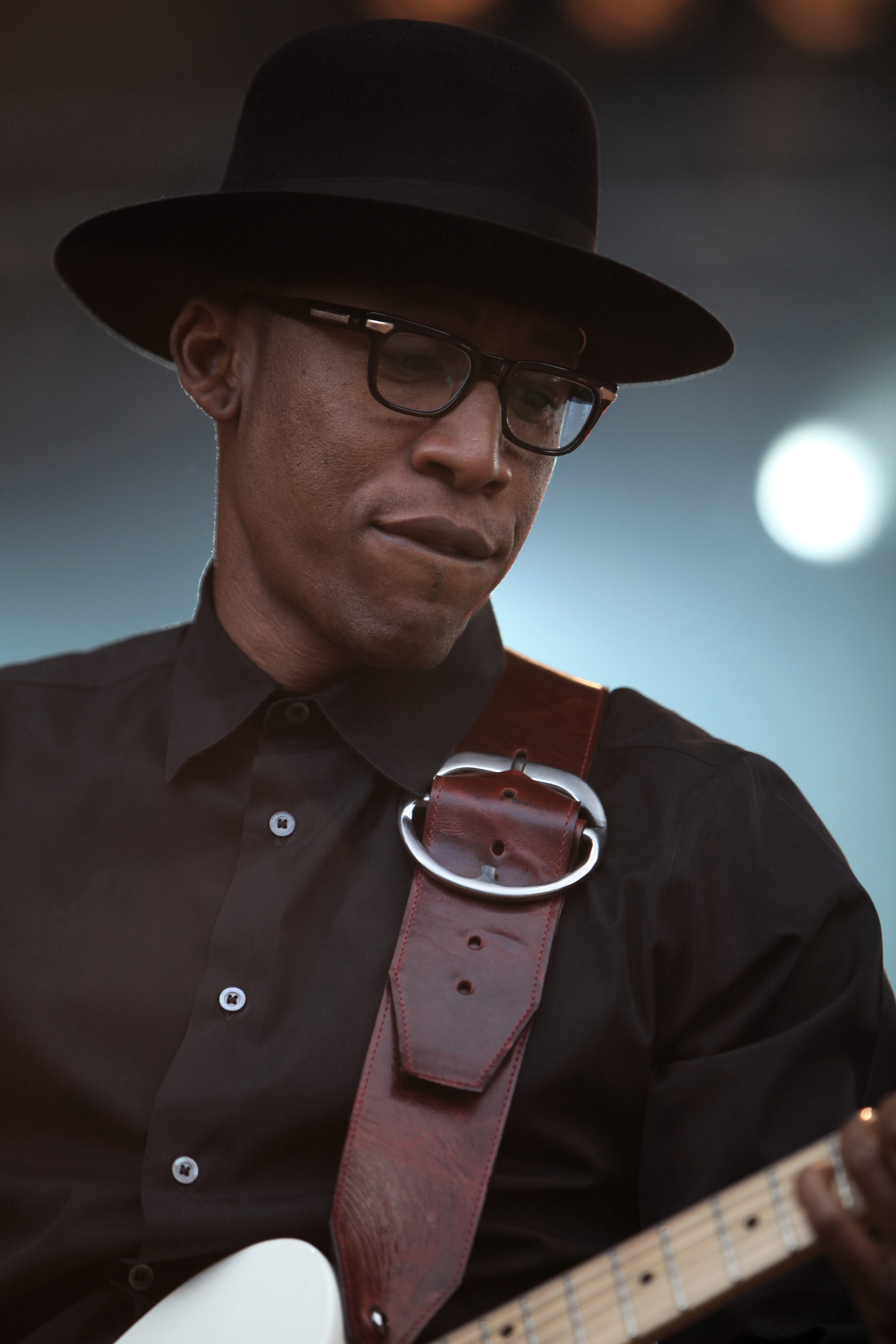
Colbie Caillat portrayed singer Lesley Gore in the third episode, while Raphael Saadiq was contracted to portray singer Sam Cooke on The Playboy Club.

Several songs popular during the 1960s were featured in The Playboy Club. Verve Records, the record label owned by Universal Music Group, formed a partnership with 20th Century Fox Television and the Apple Inc. company iTunes to make those song versions available for download on the iTunes Store. 20th Century Fox Television chairmen Gary Newman and Dana Walden cited the success of similar track sales on the Fox musical series Glee as a reason for the venture with The Playboy Club, as they felt it would expose the series to a wider audience. The individual tracks were being produced by The Transcenders, a Los Angeles music production team that included the producers Mike Fratantuno, Terrance Graves and Brian Lapin. The cast vocals were recorded in Chicago by vocal producer Richard Marx. Geoff Bywater, the vice president of music for 20th Century Fox Television, said a soundtrack album for the series was also under consideration. The Playboy Club was to feature several guest performances by singers portraying real-life musicians from the 1960s period.

Cast member Laura Benanti performed a version of Fred Fisher's "Chicago (That Toddlin' Town)" during a scene from the pilot. Also in that episode, actress Karen LeBlanc portrayed Tina Turner, appearing with others portraying singer Ike Turner and the backing vocalists The Ikettes. She sang "Shake a Tail Feather" and "Tina's Wish". Those songs were immediately made available on iTunes. Cast members Leah Renee and Naturi Naughton were also to sing in future episodes. Pop singer and songwriter Colbie Caillat appeared in the third episode as Lesley Gore and sang her hit song "It's My Party". Javier Colon, the first season winner of the NBC reality talent series The Voice, was slated to portray soul musician Ray Charles in The Playboy Club, singing the song "Let the Good Times Roll". Singer and songwriter Raphael Saadiq was booked to portray Sam Cooke, and sing "Having a Party" in the 4th episode. Other singers were planned to be featured in the series but never cast, including Frank Sinatra, Sammy Davis Jr., Dusty Springfield, Roy Orbison and James Brown.

Other songs featured on The Playboy Club, and later featured on iTunes, included "Walk Like a Man" by Terry Dexter, and "In the Mood" by Laura Benanti. Even though the series was set in 1961, a number of songs performed on the show were not released until several years after that.

=== Cancellation ===
NBC canceled the show on October 4, 2011, after just three episodes, making it the first network television series of the 2011–2012 United States network television season to be canceled. Entertainment Weekly writer James Hibberd said the cancellation came as no surprise not only due to low ratings, but also because, "the industry had low expectations for the 1960s set drama, which attempted to replicate a retro Mad Men vibe but for a wide audience and on a network with plenty of content restrictions". NBC did not plan to broadcast the remaining episodes that were already filmed. The Playboy Club's NBC timeslot was briefly replaced by repeat episodes of the new police drama series Prime Suspect, until October 31, when the new Brian Williams news program Rock Center with Brian Williams took its place. Filming for additional episodes of The Playboy Club continued until October 10, as the show's production company hoped to eventually sell the series to another network. Both Hefner and Hodge expressed hope that the series would be picked up by Bravo.

Hefner expressed disappointment that the series did not find an audience and, via his Twitter account, said he believed the show should have appeared on cable and targeted a more "adult audience". Actress Laura Benanti said via Twitter shortly after the cancellation, "Wow. Tough day. Best cast, best crew, we deserved more." She later said in an interview: "I just feel there are times people will want to jump on a show and kill it." Likewise, David Krumholtz wrote via Twitter, "Insulated minds make bad decisions," and Naturi Naughton released a Twitter message that read simply, "RIDICULOUS".

In response to the cancellation, the Parents Television Council (PTC) released a statement: "We're pleased that NBC will no longer be airing a program so inherently linked to a pornographic brand that denigrates and sexualizes women...we hope other broadcasters heed the important lessons of this programming debacle." James Hibberd wrote that the show's chance of survival "wasn't helped" by the PTC protests, but that it was ultimately the ratings that led to its cancellation. Likewise, Robert Seidman of TV by the Numbers said it was ratings rather than the PTC's efforts had anything to do with the network's decision, and Tim Goodman of The Hollywood Reporter blamed the bad quality of the show itself: "This cancellation wasn't about boycotts. It was about owning up to the obvious."

The Chicago Film Office estimated another $16 million would have gone toward Chicago if The Playboy Club had not been canceled and production continued until the end of the year.

== Episodes ==
No.	Title	Directed by	Written by	Original release date	Prod. code	US viewers (millions)	18–49 rating
1	"Pilot"	Alan Taylor	Chad Hodge and Becky Mode	September 19, 2011	1ATE79	5.02	1.6/4
The first week for Maureen, a newly hired Bunny, sees her getting caught up in the murder of mob boss Bruno Bianchi. Nick Dalton, one of Chicago's top attorneys and Club key-holder, comes to her aid; his girlfriend Carol-Lynne makes an ambitious move and becomes the first Bunny Mother. Meanwhile, Bunnies Janie, Alice and Brenda each deal with their own personal issues and secrets while the club's general manager Billy Rosen tries his best to keep the club running without interference from the mob.
2	"The Scarlet Bunny" "The Scarlett Bunny"	Scott Winant	Story by : Chad Hodge & Karyn Usher; Teleplay by : Chad Hodge	September 26, 2011	1ATE01	3.97	1.3/4
The bunnies are excited to learn there will be a contest to be a Playboy magazine covergirl, but for some it means revealing their past. As new Bunny Mother Carol-Lynne begins training the women, especially new Bunny Maureen to be the perfect bunny, she discovers a dark secret Maureen has been hiding. Meanwhile, Nick gets Mayor Daley's support to run for District Attorney with a little help from an unlikely source.
3	"A Matter of Simple Duplicity" "An Act of Simple Duplicity"	Lesli Linka Glatter	Mark Fish	October 3, 2011	1ATE02	3.47	1.2/3
Maureen cozies up to the mob; Nick steps up his campaign, and Carol-Lynne breaks in a new Bunny.
4	"The Dream House and How to Avoid It"	Kenny Ortega	Hannah Shakespeare	Unaired	1ATE03	N/A	N/A
This episode was originally scheduled to air on October 10, 2011, but did not as the series was canceled.
5	"Trouble in Makeoutsville"	Holly Dale	Luke Schelhaas	Unaired	1ATE04	N/A	N/A
This episode was originally scheduled to air on October 17, 2011, but did not as the series was canceled.
6	"A Tryst of Fate"	Phil Abraham	Unknown	Unaired	1ATE05	N/A	N/A
This episode was in production on October 4, 2011, when the series was canceled.
7	"Ding Dong Ghoul"	Holly Dale	Unknown	Unaired	1ATE06	N/A	N/A
This episode was finished on October 10, 2011. It was filmed with two endings, one of which was described as "more final" by Laura Benanti.

== Broadcast ==
The Playboy Club aired in the United States on NBC from September 19 to October 3, 2011. The series also aired in Canada on the Citytv network, airing on the same night as the NBC telecast, but the scheduling varied as the Citytv outlets in Calgary and Edmonton aired it at 8 p.m., while Toronto, Vancouver and Winnipeg followed NBC's 10 p.m. pattern, simsubbing with NBC in many areas. The season premiere broadcast on Citytv was seen by 485,000 viewers.

=== Marketing ===
The Playboy Club was heavily advertised on NBC and elsewhere in the weeks leading up to the series premiere. Laura Benanti appeared on a retro style cover of Playboy magazine released on September 16, 2011. The magazine had a 1961 theme, which included an old-fashioned visual style, photos of 1960s Playboy Bunnies and clubs, and the same 60 cent price as that time period. Benanti wore a black Bunny costume and held a tray with drinks on the cover photo. NBC also entered into a cross-promotional deal with the Bloomingdale's department store. The Walton Street store in Chicago included display windows inspired by the series, which were unveiled in September 2011 by The Playboy Club stars Benanti, Naturi Naughton and Wes Ramsey. Chosen for the storefronts due to its close proximity to the original Playboy Club, the Walton Street store allowed visitors to take virtual photos with the show's stars, view photos of the real-life clubs and the show's set, and enter into a contest to win such prizes as a walk-on role on the show and a $5,000 Bloomingdale's shopping spree.

== Reception ==
=== Protests ===
The conservative advocacy group Parents Television Council (PTC) began protesting The Playboy Club and calling for boycotts against it immediately after NBC picked it up, long before the series debuted. They called it a "blatant attempt to obliterate any remaining standards of broadcast decency", and criticized the idea of a series with Playboy in the title at all. The group claimed the show objectified and degraded women, advanced an anti-family agenda and helped mainstream the pornography industry through its support of the Playboy brand. They criticized Comcast, owner of NBCUniversal, claiming their decision to carry The Playboy Club violated an agreement it made with Federal Communications Commission (FCC) regulators during the purchase of NBCUniversal not to broadcast pornographic material over public airwaves. The PTC expressed particular concern about the nudity clauses included in some cast members' contracts, which led PTC President Tim Winter to accuse the series of distributing pornography. The group claimed The Playboy Club underscored the need for President Barack Obama and the United States Department of Justice to fight for the reinstitution of the Broadcast Decency Enforcement Act of 2005. The PTC sent letters to every NBC affiliate asking them not to air The Playboy Club, warning that if they did, the group would urge members to file complaints with the FCC if any inappropriate material were broadcast.

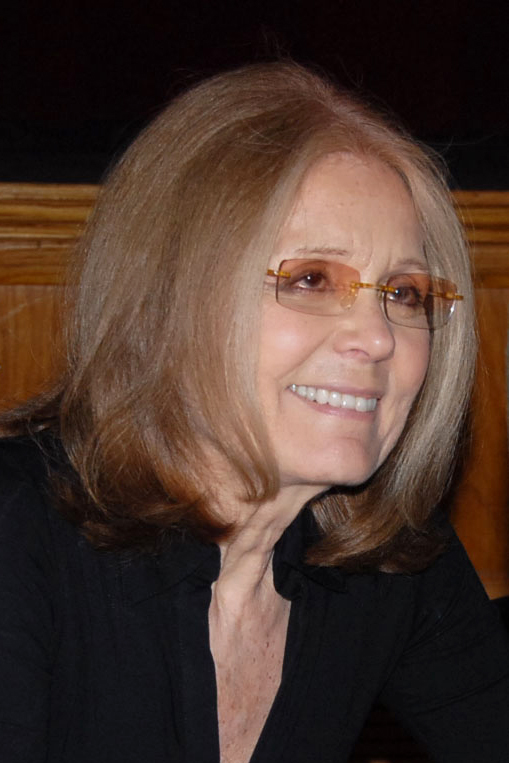
Activist Gloria Steinem encouraged Americans to boycott The Playboy Club.

Several other groups and individuals spoke out against The Playboy Club. Gloria Steinem, a feminist activist who once disguised herself as a Playboy Bunny to write an article about the conditions inside the Playboy Clubs, also encouraged a boycott of the series. She claimed the premise normalized the concepts of male dominance and prostitution, and said, "Clearly The Playboy Club is not going to be accurate. It was the tackiest place on earth. It was not glamorous at all." The anti-pornography organization Morality in Media established an online petition urging NBC to end the show, calling for advertisers to boycott it and asking supporters to promise not to watch the series. The group's president, Patrick Trueman, said the show would encourage the acceptance of pornography and contribute to exploitation of women. Morality in Media started a website called CloseTheClubOnNBC.com, where visitors could click a link to send a protest e-mail message to NBC affiliates. The Pink Cross Foundation, an anti-pornography organization started by former adult actress Shelley Lubben, also started an online petition calling for The Playboy Club's cancellation. Lubben said of the series, "NBC is breaking the law with this show. They’re not meeting FCC standards." The Florida Family Association, a one-man fundamentalist organization "on the Christian right" that says it's 'defending American values,'" announced it would document all companies that advertise with The Playboy Club and publicize their names online and in e-mail messages to supporters.

Chad Hodge said most of the protests and calls for boycotts were coming from people and organizations who admitted they had not watched the show itself. Hodge claimed they were drawing false conclusions based on their perceptions of Playboy magazine. Stars Amber Heard and Leah Renee defended the series at a 2011 Television Critics Association panel. Heard said, "This is about choice. Ultimately it's a different generation with different opportunities and different expectations for women." "The way we look at things, if it involves sexuality, somehow a woman must be compromised," Renee said. "And I think it's just as chauvinistic to deny a woman her sexuality," Heard said. "It's about the time. It comes down to choices. If they are making the choice, they are not being exploited."

In mid-June 2011, representatives from KSL-TV, the NBC affiliate in Salt Lake City, Utah, announced they would not broadcast The Playboy Club due to concerns about objectionable content and its association with the Playboy name. Station President Mark Willes said of this: "The Playboy brand is known internationally. Everyone is clear what it stands for. We want to be sure everyone is clear what the KSL brand stands for, which is completely inconsistent with the Playboy brand." The station did not carry the sketch comedy series Saturday Night Live (though mostly for scheduling reasons more than content), and felt screening The Playboy Club, would conflict with their participation in the "Out in the Light" public affairs campaign, which educates people on the social effects of pornography, NBC Entertainment Chairman Robert Greenblatt rebuffed Willes' claims, stating he would not broadcast the show if he believed it was inappropriate. and Hodge said, "I'm sure they're going to beg to air it soon. I think once they see the show and where future episodes can go, there's really nothing to be concerned about." KMYU, a MyNetworkTV affiliate, broadcast the show in its original timeslot in Salt Lake City in place of KSL.

In August 2011, the San Francisco Commission on the Status of Women issued a non-binding resolution stating The Playboy Club represented "a major step backward for women who have struggled to earn an equal place in the workplace, in the community and at home," and urged NBC to replace it with a show that "depicts women's substantive achievements". They unsuccessfully petitioned the San Francisco Board of Supervisors to release a similar resolution. Once episodes of The Playboy Club began to broadcast, the PTC asked its members to contact the show's advertisers and encourage them to end their sponsorships with the series. By the end of the first episode, several advertisers did end their working relationship with the series, including the Campbell Soup Company, Lenovo, Kraft Foods, P. F. Chang's China Bistro, Spring, Subway and The UPS Store. Citing the show's low ratings as evidence that television viewers agreed with the PTC's concerns, the group encouraged other advertisers to withdraw, including Capital One, Chrysler and Samsung. Those groups ultimately kept their sponsorships with the series intact, a move Chrysler defended by announcing they were seeking to deliver information about their products to as broad and diverse an audience as possible.

=== Critical response ===
The Hollywood Reporter called The Playboy Club one of the 12 most anticipated television shows of the season.

In a review of the pilot episode, NPR writer Linda Holmes challenged the show's assertions of female empowerment. Finding the episode itself "silly and full of bad dialogue ... cheesy more than offensive", Holmes questioned how a series about women whose conduct and appearance were micromanaged could simultaneously claim that those regimented women were uniformly empowered by the experience. "You can shake a Bunny tail and be empowered, no argument. It depends on what's going on in the rest of your life. But shaking a Bunny tail isn't enough to demonstrate empowerment if you have to go to Eddie Cibrian or Hugh Hefner for help every time you have a problem, and having the right not to be slapped on the behind when you deliver a cocktail isn't exactly a societal advance on the order of universal suffrage." The series, she concluded, might have been better served had those involved positioned it as a camp soap opera and not tried to make a feminist statement.

In contrast to those upset with the show's association with the Playboy brand, some television critics were disappointed in the lack of sexual content. Alan Pergament, former critic for The Buffalo News, said of the show: "The truth is Playboy should have been a pay-cable series because without the sex it is pretty boring and tame." Entertainment Weekly writer Margaret Lyons accused the show of "shamelessly cribbing Mad Men's style", calling Eddie Cibrian's performance an imitation of Jon Hamm's Don Draper and even citing specific shots and camera angles similar to those in Mad Men. Lyons wrote, "Playboy can't copy the lyricism or narrative potency that make Mad Men what it is, which is more than a collection of artfully arranged period hairdos and moody pairs of people in front of rectangle-patterned backgrounds. [But] it's sure trying!"

Tim Goodman of The Hollywood Reporter said the Playboy brand and the lifestyle portrayed in the series was dated and uninteresting: "It was [a] bad show, period. The writing was weak, the acting spotty and the sexism too ridiculous and obvious to comment on more than once." TVLine writer Matt Webb Mitovich praised Benanti's performance and said the series evoked the 1960s era well, but not as well as Pan Am and Mad Men. He felt the Playboy Club setting itself was too claustrophobic and that Cibrian was not strong enough for his part.

In an article for the LGBT website AfterElton.com, writer Lesley Goldberg said the Mattachine Society subplot was a "surprising and welcome twist, and indicates Playboy has more on its mind than just women in skimpy outfits".

Marilyn Miller, who spent six years working in as a Playboy Bunny in real-life clubs, told Vanity Fair that the series was unrealistic, particularly in its portrayal of the Bunnies dancing with and dating the customers. Miller said, "I thought it was cheap, it was degrading, it was demoralizing.... Not one Bunny I know liked the show. Everyone is hoping it gets canceled." In contrast, former Playboy Bunny Jennifer Jackson said she enjoyed the show, particularly the storyline, the casting and the set design.

=== Ratings ===
The series premiere of The Playboy Club drew an estimated 5.02 million household viewers in its original American broadcast on September 19, 2011, according to Nielsen Media Research. That was the lowest viewership among the major networks in the 10 p.m. timeslot, with the ABC police comedy drama Castle drawing 13.28 million households and the CBS police drama Hawaii Five-0 drawing 12.19 million households. The episode gradually shed viewers from the first half to the next, with an average of 5.36 million households tuning in for the initial half hour and an average of 4.69 million households for the second. The debut earned a 1.6 rating/4 share among viewers between ages 18 and 48, which was considered a disappointing result for a coveted demographic. Speculation began immediately that the series could be canceled, but NBC officials told Deadline Hollywood that such a decision would not be rushed because NBC Chairman Robert Greenblatt wanted to send a message that NBC was willing to give all their new shows the necessary time to find an audience and succeed.

The ratings dropped about 19 percent for the September 26 broadcast of the second episode, which drew an estimated 3.97 million households and a 1.3 rating/3 share among ages 18 to 49. The Playboy Club was once again defeated in its timeslot by Castle and Hawaii Five-0, which had viewership numbers of 11.67 million and 11.26 million, respectively. In writing about these ratings, Bill Gorman of the website TV by the Numbers wrote, "The Playboy Club [is] making a move to be the first show canceled of the new season." The third and last episode aired, broadcast on October 3, dropped another eight percent in the Nielsen ratings, drawing 3.47 million household viewers and a 1.2 rating/3 share.
