= Runaway (2006 TV series) =

- Genre: Drama
- Created by: Chad Hodge
- Starring: Donnie Wahlberg; Dustin Milligan; Karen LeBlanc; Leslie Hope; Nathan Gamble; Sandrine Holt; Sarah Ramos; Susan Floyd
- Composer: David Schwartz
- Country of origin: United States
- Original language: English
- No. of seasons: 1
- No. of episodes: 9 (6 unaired)

Production
- Running time: 60 minutes
- Production companies: Golly; Darren Star Productions; Sony Pictures Television

Original release
- Network: The CW
- Release: September 25 – October 15, 2006

Runaway is an American drama television series that aired on The CW from September 25, 2006, to October 15, 2006. The series was created by Chad Hodge and was produced by Golly and Darren Star Productions in association with Sony Pictures Television. Along with The Game, it was one of only two series on the new network not to be inherited as previously aired from either of its predecessor networks, The WB and UPN. The show was canceled on October 18, 2006.

== Synopsis ==
Runaway chronicles the life of the Hollands, an average middle-class American family who just moved to Bridgewater, Iowa, ostensibly from New Orleans, Louisiana, in the aftermath of Hurricane Katrina.

Despite appearing to be just a normal family looking for a change of scenery, the Hollands are actually the Raders, a family from Potomac, Maryland who are evading the law after Paul Rader, the family patriarch, was convicted of a murder that he did not commit and subsequently jumped bail.

Furthermore, the Raders are hunted by the person who did commit the murder. The killer targets the family, particularly the three children. In a plot line similar to The Fugitive, Paul seeks evidence that will clear his name and end his family's masquerade and danger.

== Characters ==
=== Main ===
- Paul Rader/Jim Holland (Donnie Wahlberg) is the patriarch of the family, and a successful attorney. He was wrongfully accused of the murder of Erin Baxter, a young associate in his law firm, which he believes was connected to a secret investigation she was conducting. The real killer's next move is to go after his three children, so Paul must relocate them while also trying to stay a step ahead of the law enforcement agents pursuing him.
- Lily Rader/Brenda Holland (Leslie Hope) is the wife and mother of the family who previously owned an art gallery near their former home in Maryland.
- Henry Rader/Jason Holland (Dustin Milligan) is the elder son in the family, a high school sophomore. He misses his girlfriend Kylie in Maryland and sometimes takes rash risks in order to try and communicate with her.
- Hannah Rader/Kate Holland (Sarah Ramos) is the only daughter in the family, also a high school sophomore, who seems to be the only one who prefers the possibility of creating a new life where she isn't the social outcast she was back in Maryland.
- Tommy Rader/Michael "Mikey" Holland (Nathan Gamble) is the younger son of the family, eight years old. As the youngest, it is the most difficult for him to keep his lies straight.
- Angela Huntley (Karen LeBlanc) is the lead investigator assigned to the Raders' case and is considered one of the best agents in the U.S. Marshals Service.
- Gina Bennett (Susan Floyd) is the Raders' local realtor, a single mother with a law school education who helps the Raders in their new lives.

=== Recurring ===
- Jake Bennett (Craig Olejnik), Gina's only son, who is seen in the first episode taking an instant dislike to Henry and making his life at school difficult. The family eventually finds out that he and his mother have been on the run from his abusive father, and are also using assumed identities to hide.
- Brady Sullivan (Andrew Lawrence), the son of the Raders' neighbors Bob and Mary Sullivan and a potential new love interest for Hannah.
- Amber (Leah Renee Cudmore), Hannah's new friend and the leader of the popular clique whom also happens to be Brady's girlfriend, complicating Hannah's developing feelings toward the boy.
- Sam (Melanie Merkosky), Henry's new friend who often defends him from Jake and assists him and Hannah into 'fitting in' at Bridgewater.
- Susie (Niamh Wilson), Tommy's classmate at school who consistently antagonizes him until he is forced to save her amidst a deadly tornado.
- Kylie McDaniels (Kristen Hager), Henry's girlfriend back in Maryland whom he misses dearly and will do anything in the world to be with, even if it means endangering the safeties of himself and his family.
- Agent Raj Rao (Raoul Bhaneja), Huntley's quick-witted partner in the U.S. Marshals who doesn't take her determination to apprehend the Rader family seriously.
- Tannen (Aaron Abrams), a former associate of Paul's who may hold the key to solving Erin's murder.
- Erin (Sandrine Holt), Paul's co-worker, mistress, and the victim of a brutal murder wrongfully attributed to Paul.
- Lloyd Cunningham (Craig Eldridge), Paul's defense attorney.

== Cancellation ==
The CW cancelled Runaway on October 18, 2006, four weeks after its debut. Runaway holds the distinction of being the first show to be canceled on the new network. The show never found an audience and had the lowest ratings of the programming on all 5 major broadcast networks.

== Episodes ==
Thirteen episode scripts were ordered, and nine episodes were filmed, but only three were broadcast by the CW. The unfilmed scripts were: "They Say It's Your Birthday", "Dashing Through the Snow", "Trial and Error", and "Knock, Knock".

List of Runaway episodes
No.	Title	Original release date	Prod. code	US viewers (millions)
1	"Pilot"	September 25, 2006	100	2.2
Paul Rader and his family, on the run from the law after Paul was wrongly convicted of murder and jumped bail, arrive in Bridgewater posing as the Hollands, a family that has supposedly been moving around from place to place after losing their home to Hurricane Katrina. Using their cover story, Paul's wife Lily enrolls her two oldest children, Henry and Hannah, at the local high school as twins Jason and Kate Holland. Paul lands a job as a cook at a diner, where he meets the town realtor, Gina Bennett. Hannah meets Brady, her neighbor who also attends the same school, while Henry briefly runs away from home after arguing with his father only to return after realizing he cannot abandon his family. Angela Huntley, the marshal assigned to locate Paul, finds an address in a car Paul abandoned, but it actually a false trail he left intentionally. Paul accesses the email account of the woman he supposedly murdered and receives a threatening message to "stay lost" or his family will be killed.
2	"Identity Crisis"	October 2, 2006	101	1.9
3	"Mr. Rader Goes to Washington"	October 15, 2006	102	1.8
4	"Homecoming"	unaired	103	TBD
5	"Father Figure"	unaired	104	TBD
6	"Liar, Liar"	unaired	105	TBD
7	"Turn, Turn, Turn"	unaired	106	TBD
8	"There's No Place Like Home"	unaired	107	TBD
9	"End Game"	unaired	108	TBD

== Broadcast ==
The series aired on both Global and CH in Canada. In March 2009, 3e started showing Runaway for the first time in Ireland. In June 2007, British Television channel E4 started showing Runaway. In the UK, the fifth episode was due to be shown on July 18, but was replaced by How to Look Good Naked; the episode was eventually shown early the next morning at 1:35am and since then had a very late timeslot of around 1 am, Thursday morning. The show's slot was moved from late evening to early morning due to poor ratings. All nine episodes were aired in the UK.

== Ratings ==
For the season it was broadcast, Runaway scored last with a ranking of 142, and an average of 2 million viewers. In May 2007, the other new, scripted CW drama, Hidden Palms, would go to achieve a new CW record with even lower viewer turnout than Runaway—even in the less competitive summer season.
