= Single All the Way =

2021 film

- Official release poster
- Directed by: Michael Mayer
- Written by: Chad Hodge
- Produced by: Joel S. Rice
- Starring: Michael Urie; Philemon Chambers; Luke Macfarlane; Barry Bostwick; Jennifer Robertson; Jennifer Coolidge; Kathy Najimy
- Cinematography: Éric Cayla
- Edited by: Adriaan van Zyl
- Music by: Anton Sanko
- Production company: Muse Entertainment
- Distributed by: Netflix
- Release date: December 2, 2021
- Running time: 101 minutes
- Country: Canada
- Language: English

Single All the Way is a 2021 Canadian Christmas romantic comedy film directed by Michael Mayer and written by Chad Hodge. The plot follows Peter (Michael Urie) who convinces Nick, his best friend (Philemon Chambers), to pretend to be his boyfriend when he goes home for Christmas, only to be set up on a blind date by his mother (Kathy Najimy). Luke Macfarlane, Barry Bostwick, Jennifer Robertson, and Jennifer Coolidge also star.

The film was released by Netflix on December 2, 2021.

== Plot ==
Peter, a social media strategist living in Los Angeles, is tired of his entire family hounding him about his single status each year when he visits them for the holidays. He is excited to bring his new boyfriend Tim to New Hampshire to meet them, until he finds out that he is married when Tim's wife hires Peter's best friend and roommate Nick as a freelance handyman. Devastated, Peter convinces Nick to travel to New Hampshire with him and pretend that they are dating.

Before Peter and Nick can announce their fake relationship, Peter's mother Carole tells him that she has arranged a blind date between him and her spinning instructor James. Peter reluctantly agrees with encouragement from Carole and Nick.

The rest of Peter's family arrive: his father Harold, his sisters Lisa and Ashleigh and their respective families, and his aunt Sandy, who directs the annual children's Christmas pageant. Harold privately tells Nick that he has always thought that he and Peter would be perfect for each other. He also notes that Peter seems happiest when he is with Nick.

Meanwhile, Peter goes on several dates with James, including buying a Christmas tree and a day of skiing. They enjoy themselves, though Peter repeatedly brings up Nick in conversation and he begins to feel torn between spending his limited time with James versus his family. He tells Nick that he is considering moving back to New Hampshire, to his dismay.

Peter's boss calls him to tell him that they are abandoning their latest advertising campaign and instructs Peter to develop a new campaign, featuring "real people" instead of models, within the next day. Harold, who is trying to get Peter and Nick to spend more time together, suggests photographing Nick; though Nick is initially reluctant, the photoshoot is a success. Lisa's daughters, Sofia and Daniela, are also rooting for Peter and Nick to get together.

The nieces force Nick to admit to himself that he is in love with Peter, and they later pretend to fall asleep in Peter's bed so that he has to share Nick's bed. The next day, Sofia and Daniela talk to Peter who tells them that he has feelings for Nick but is afraid to risk their friendship. Aunt Sandy's Christmas pageant is a success thanks to the help of Peter and Nick.

Afterwards, Nick confesses his feelings to Peter, who is still fearful that a relationship could put their friendship in jeopardy. He tells Nick that he has decided to move back home. As Peter heads to the bar with James to celebrate the pageant's success, Nick packs his bags and prepares to return to Los Angeles, but takes on one more handyman job of re-painting a shop whose owner is retiring.

James tells Peter that they are not a match for each other and that Peter belongs with Nick. So, Peter rushes home to find Nick gone. He sees their rental car at the shop, so he enters. Nick tells him that he has paid the first six months of the shop's rent as a Christmas present to Peter, who has always wanted to open a plant store. Peter finally tells Nick that he is in love with him, and they share a kiss. On Christmas Day, they announce that they are dating and plan to move to New Hampshire together, to the delight of Peter's entire family.

== Cast ==
- Michael Urie as Peter
- Philemon Chambers as Nick
- Luke Macfarlane as James
- Barry Bostwick as Harold
- Jennifer Robertson as Lisa
- Jennifer Coolidge as Aunt Sandy
- Kathy Najimy as Carole
- Madison Brydges as Daniela
- Alexandra Beaton as Sofia
- Dan Finnerty as Kevin the Snow Plow Guy
- Steve Lund as Tim
- Melanie Leishman as Ashleigh
- Gryffin Hanvelt as Simon, Ashleigh's older son
- Viggo Hanvelt as Sam, Ashleigh's younger son
- Stefano DiMatteo as Tony, Lisa's husband
- Victor Andrés Trelles Turgeon as Jim, Ashleigh's husband

== Production and release ==
In March 2021, Variety reported that Michael Mayer would direct Single All the Way, a Christmas-themed romantic comedy about gay men, for Netflix. Most of the cast was announced at that time, as well as screenwriter and executive producer Chad Hodge and producer Joel S. Rice. Hodge wrote the character of Aunt Sandy with Jennifer Coolidge in mind, saying that she was among the things that he "would want to see in a gay Christmas movie", without knowing at first whether she would agree to be part of the film. Auditions took place in late 2020. Michael Urie was asked to send an audition tape for the character of Nick, but felt that Peter was a better fit.

Principal photography took place in Montreal, Quebec. Kathy Najimy's husband, Dan Finnerty, was cast after he wanted to join Najimy in Montreal and learned that COVID-19 travel restrictions at the Canada–United States border required him to be working. He wrote and performed two original songs ("Mrs. Claus" and "Single All the Way") as Kevin, a snow plow operator. Ruth Coolidge of Screen Rant compared Finnerty's role in the film to his "similarly iconic role" as the wedding singer in The Hangover (2009).

Following the November 10, 2021 trailer, the Netflix digital release on December 2 was the first gay holiday film for the streaming service.

== Reception ==
=== Audience viewership ===
During its debut week, Single All the Way ranked at number 6 on Netflix's top 10 weekly rankings for English-language films, based on its methodology of measuring a film or TV show by the number of hours it was viewed, with 13.82 million hours watched. It also ranked in the weekly top 10 on Netflix in 42 countries. In the second week of release, it had a viewership of 11.14 million hours and ranked at number 5 on Netflix's chart, while remaining in the top 10 Netflix rankings in 36 countries.

=== Critical response ===
On the review aggregator website Rotten Tomatoes, 70% of 27 reviews are positive, with an average rating of 6.4/10. Metacritic, which uses a weighted average, assigned the film a score of 49 out of 100 based on 6 critics, indicating "mixed or average reviews".

The script was criticized for its usage of common tropes in Christmas romantic comedy films. Though Benjamin Lee of The Guardian commented that the film's "overwhelming conventionality ... is kind of the point" as it places gay characters in a familiar setting, he felt that it was too formulaic. Urie and Chambers were praised for their individual performances, but critics disagreed about their interactions on-screen. Ferdosi Abdi, writing for Screen Rant, commented that "the chemistry between the pair is palpable" and described Peter and Nick as "one of the strongest depictions of a couple" within the Christmas romantic comedy genre. On the other hand, Teo Bugbee of The New York Times felt that the two actors were not close enough in many scenes and that it was even "difficult to believe the pair as best friends".

The film's depiction of gay characters in an everyday setting, without sexuality-based conflict, received praise. Critics applauded Peter's accepting family, though some felt that their interest in Peter and Nick's relationship was excessive. Writing for the San Francisco Chronicle, Carla Meyer complimented the film's incorporation of various aspects of gay culture, contrasting it with the Hallmark Channel's The Christmas House (2020), which she criticized for "narratives that de-emphasize sexuality and promote their 'just like us' qualities". Coolidge was also praised for her performance, which Jude Dry of IndieWire described as "a far cry from her typical middle-aged ditz breathiness", though others felt that her performance was limited by the script.

=== Accolades ===
| Year | Award | Category | Recipient(s) | Result | Ref. |
|---|---|---|---|---|---|
| 2022 | Producers Guild of America Awards | Outstanding Producer of Streamed or Televised Movie | Joel S. Rice | Nominated | |
| 2022 | GLAAD Media Awards | Outstanding TV Movie | Single All the Way | Won | |

== See also ==
- List of Christmas films
