= Philemon Chambers =

American actor (born 1994)

- Born: Johnathan Philemon Chambers; February 9, 1994 (age 32); Compton, California, U.S.
- Occupation: Actor
- Years active: 2020–present

Philemon Chambers (born February 9, 1994) is an American actor.

== Early life and education ==
Chambers grew up in Compton, California. He decided at age six that he wanted to become an actor. Chambers is open about being bullied as a child and teenager, as well as his struggles with body dysmorphia.

== Career ==
Chambers started acting at the age of thirteen. Chambers had small roles on several television series, including Criminal Minds and All Rise.

In 2021, Chambers portrayed Nick in the Netflix holiday rom-com Single All the Way. It was his first major feature film.

In 2022, Chambers joined the cast of Walker: Independence.

== Personal life ==
Chambers identifies as queer.

== Filmography ==
=== Actor ===
Year	Title	Role	Notes
2020	Of Hearts and Castles	Marcus	Short (credited as Johnathan P. Chambers)
2021	Single All the Way	Nick	
2022	Johnny Brown		Short
2022–2023	Walker: Independence	Augustus	
2023	Cupcakes	Kellam	Short
2025	Beauty in Black	Andy	

=== Director ===
Year	Title	Role	Notes
2024	Family Therapy		Short

== Awards and nominations ==
Year	Award	Category	Work	Result	Ref.
2021	Jim Thorpe Independent Film Festival	Best Actor	Of Hearts and Castles	Nominated	
2022	CinEuphoria Awards	Best Actor in a Short Film - International Competition	Of Hearts and Castles	Nominated	
2022	The Queerties	Film Performance	Single All the Way	Nominated	
