= Jennifer Yuh Nelson =

American film director (born 1972)

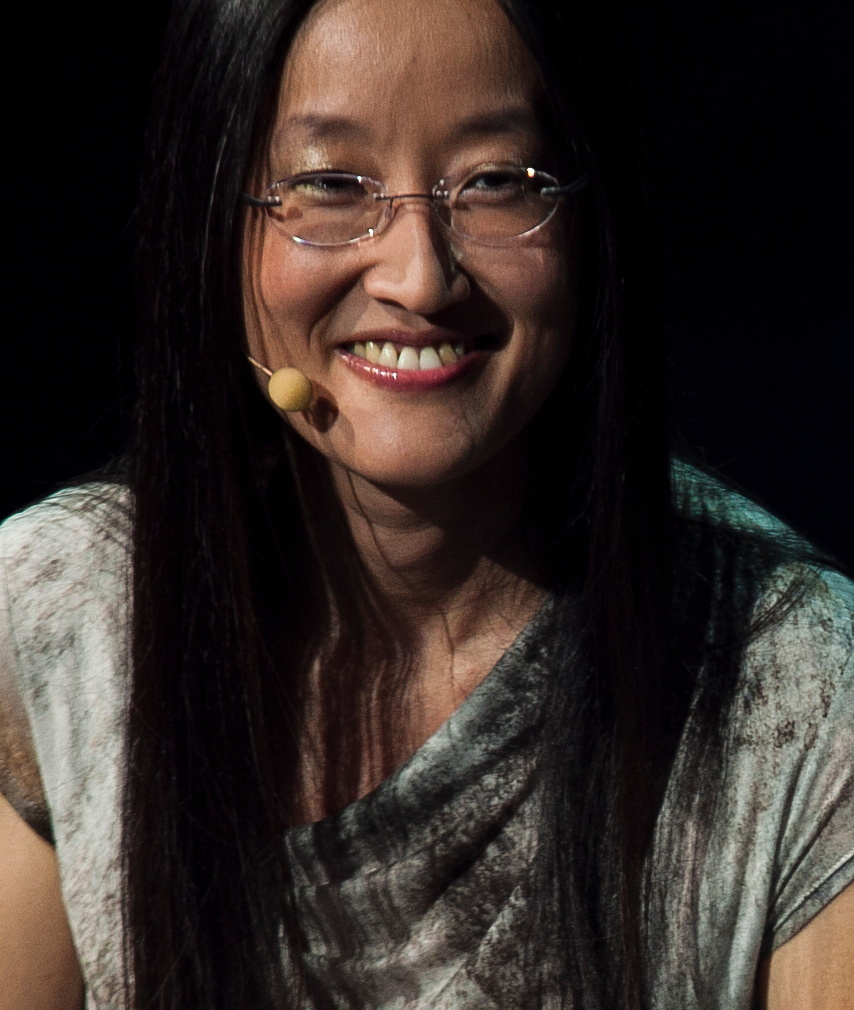
- Jennifer Yuh Nelson in May 2012 at the C2-MTL business conference
- Born: Jennifer Yuh; May 7, 1972 (age 54); South Korea
- Education: California State University, Long Beach
- Occupations: Story artist, character designer, television director, illustrator, film director
- Years active: 1994–present
- Notable work: Kung Fu Panda 2 Kung Fu Panda 3 The Darkest Minds

Jennifer Yuh Nelson (née Yuh; born May 7, 1972) is an American story artist, character designer, illustrator, and film and television director. She is best known for directing the films Kung Fu Panda 2, Kung Fu Panda 3, and The Darkest Minds. Yuh is the first woman to solely direct and the first Asian American to direct a major American animated film, and has been recognized as a commercially successful Asian American director.

She won an Annie Award for Best Storyboarding in an Animated Feature Production for directing the opening for Kung Fu Panda and was the second woman nominated for an Academy Award for Best Animated Feature, for her work on Kung Fu Panda 2. The film proved to be one of the most financially successful films directed by a woman. As a supervisor director for her work on Love, Death & Robots, she won Emmy Awards two consecutive times.

== Biography ==
Yuh was born in 1972 in South Korea and immigrated to the United States with her parents and two sisters when she was four years old. She started sketching and drawing at a young age, while developing an interest in 1980s action movies and anime. Her favorite filmmakers were James Cameron, Ridley Scott, and Katsuhiro Otomo. Yuh spent her childhood in Lakewood, California, where she enjoyed watching martial arts movies, playing with cars, and drawing. "I have been drawing since age 3 and making movies in my head for almost as long. In fact, drawing for me was a way to express those films when I had no other means of doing so," said Yuh. As a young girl, she would sit at the kitchen table for hours and watch her mother draw, copying her every stroke. As a kid, she would fancy stories with her sisters and was learning to draw to get down those stories. Yuh traces the lineage of her career to those formative family experiences.

Interested in art, Yuh followed her sisters to California State University, Long Beach, where she received a Bachelor of Fine Arts in Illustration. There she got introduced to animation, "When I was in college years later, a veteran storyboard artist came to talk to my class. He showed us how he drew movies for a living. My mind exploded. And that led to a career in animation." Jennifer then followed her sisters into the animation industry, at first working as a cleanup artist at Jetlag Productions, where she worked on various direct-to-video features. Following a brief stint at Hanna-Barbera Productions on The Real Adventures of Jonny Quest for Cartoon Network, she was later hired as a storyboard artist on HBO's Todd McFarlane's Spawn series in 1997.

In 1998, Yuh joined DreamWorks Animation as a storyboard artist, where she worked on Spirit: Stallion of the Cimarron, Sinbad: Legend of the Seven Seas, and Madagascar. As a big fan of martial arts movies, she asked to work on the first Kung Fu Panda film, where she served as head of story and director of the opening hand-drawn dream sequence. After the release of Kung Fu Panda, Jeffrey Katzenberg, DWA's CEO at the time, approached Yuh about directing Kung Fu Panda 2. Although she hadn't expressed interest in directing the sequel to the film, Producer Melissa Cobb stated that she should direct the second film due to her excellent work on the first, to which the rest of the crew supported the decision. The film proved a major critical and international box office success with a worldwide gross of $665.6 million, making it the highest-grossing film ever directed by a woman until director Jennifer Lee's Frozen two years later. She held the record for highest-grossing film by a solo female director until the release of Patty Jenkins' 2017 film Wonder Woman. She eventually became the first woman to be nominated for the Academy Award for Best Animated Feature Film (since 2007's Persepolis) and to win the Annie Award for Best Directing in a Feature Production. Yuh returned to co-direct Kung Fu Panda 3 alongside Alessandro Carloni, which was released in 2016. In July 2016, she was also added as one of the board of Governors by Academy of Motion Picture Arts and Sciences.

In 2016, Yuh announced that she would be making her live action directorial debut with an adaptation of Alexandra Bracken's The Darkest Minds for 20th Century Fox. Producer Shawn Levy praised Yuh for her visual sensibility as well as her natural narrative qualities. She described herself as soft-spoken, contrary to what contemporary directors are often personified as; instead, she used storyboards to help pitch her ideas to Shawn Levy and 21 Laps.

In June 2019, Yuh was hired as supervising director of the second season of the Netflix animated anthology series, Love, Death & Robots.

== Filmography ==
=== Director ===
Film

Year	Title	Notes
2011	Kung Fu Panda 2	
2016	Kung Fu Panda 3	Co-directed with Alessandro Carloni
2018	The Darkest Minds	

Television

Year	Title	Episodes
1998–1999	Todd McFarlane's Spawn	"Home, Bitter Home"
1998–1999	Todd McFarlane's Spawn	"Send in the KKKlowns"
1998–1999	Todd McFarlane's Spawn	"The Mindkiller"
1998–1999	Todd McFarlane's Spawn	"Hunter's Moon"
2021–present	Love, Death & Robots	"Pop Squad"
2021–present	Love, Death & Robots	"Kill Team Kill"
2021–present	Love, Death & Robots	"Spider Rose"

=== Other credits ===
Film

Year	Title	Role
1998	Dark City	Production illustrator/Story artist
2002	Spirit: Stallion of the Cimarron	Story artist
2003	Sinbad: Legend of the Seven Seas	Head of story
2005	Madagascar	Story artist
2008	Kung Fu Panda	Head of story
2019	How to Train Your Dragon: The Hidden World	Additional story artist

Television

Year	Title	Role
1997	Real Adventures of Jonny Quest	Character designer, background artist, storyboard artist
1997	Extreme Ghostbusters	Storyboard artist
1997–1999	Todd McFarlane's Spawn	Storyboard artist and character designer
1998	Spicy City	Head of story, visual effects
2008	HBO First Look	Herself
2012	IC Places Hollywood	Herself
2016	Tavis Smiley	Herself
2018	Kore Conversations	Herself
2021–present	Love, Death & Robots	Supervising director

Direct-to-video

Year	Title	Role
1994	Cinderella	Assistant designer
1994	Happy, the Littlest Bunny	Assistant designer
1994	Leo the Lion: King of the Jungle	Assistant designer
1994	A Christmas Carol	Assistant designer
1995	Alice in Wonderland	Assistant designer
1995	Magic Gift of the Snowman	Assistant designer
1995	Jungle Book	Assistant designer
1995	Heidi	Assistant designer
2003	Sinbad and the Cyclops Island	Story writer
2008	Kung Fu Panda: Secrets of the Furious Five	Storyboard artist

== Awards and nominations ==
- Annie Award for Best Storyboarding in an Animated Feature Production at 36th Annie Awards
- Annie Award for Best Directing in an Animated Feature Production at 39th Annie Awards
- Primetime Emmy Award for Outstanding Animated Program (For Programming More Than One Hour) at 51st Primetime Emmy Awards
- Primetime Emmy Award for Outstanding Short Form Animated Program at 73rd Primetime Creative Arts Emmy Awards
- Primetime Emmy Award for Outstanding Short Form Animated Program at 74th Primetime Creative Arts Emmy Awards
- Maverick Award at 2011 LA Femme International Film Festival
- Academy Award nomination for Best Animated Feature
- KoreAm Award for Director of the Year
- In May 2023, she was awarded an honorary doctorate from her alma mater, California State University, Long Beach.
