= Alexandra Bracken =

American author

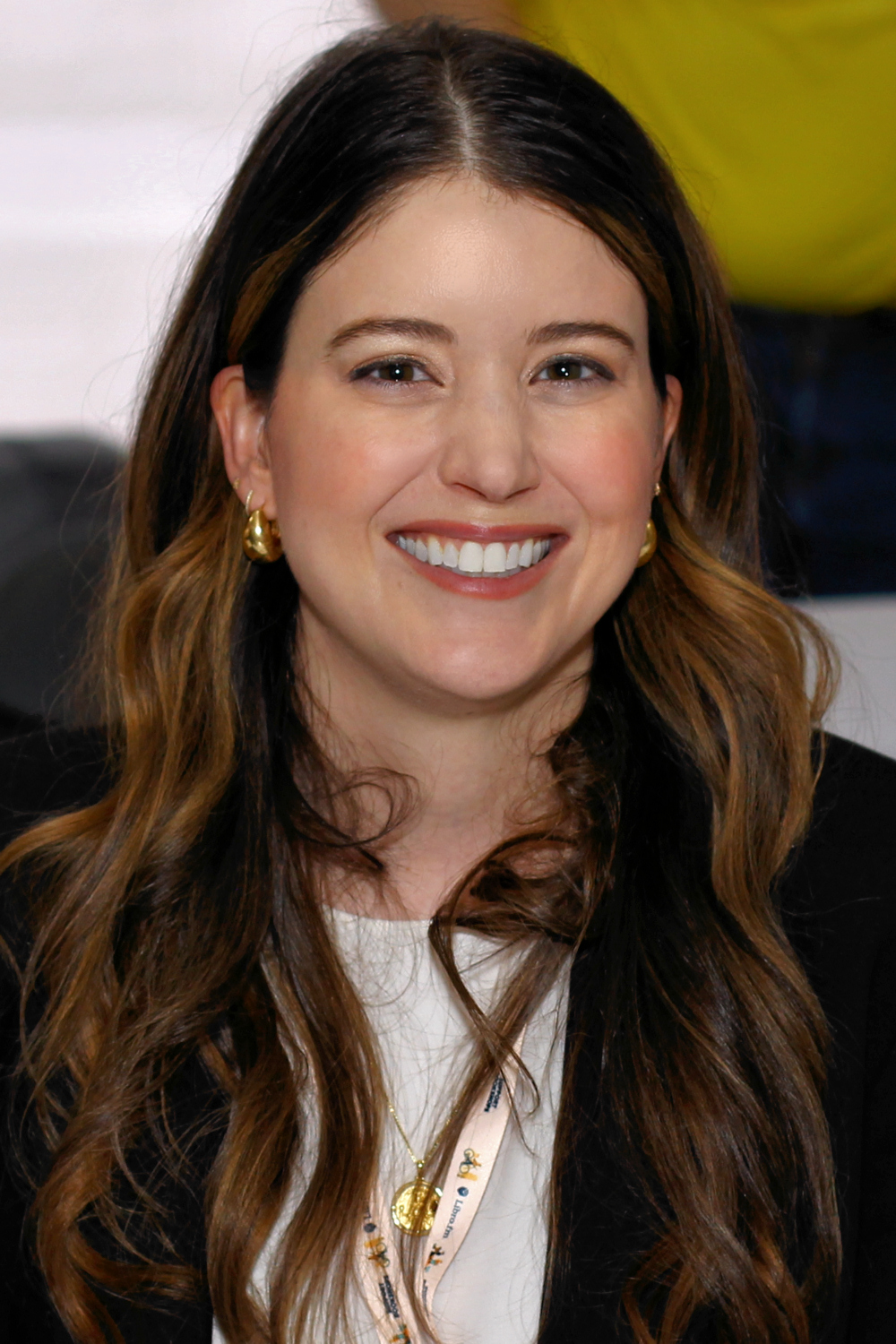
- Bracken at the 2023 Texas Book Festival
- Born: February 27, 1987 (age 39); Phoenix, Arizona, U.S.
- Education: Chaparral High School; College of William & Mary (BA)
- Occupation: Author
- Writing career
- Genre: Young-adult fantasy
- Notable works: The Darkest Minds, Passenger, Lore
- Website: alexandrabracken.com

Alexandra Bracken (born February 27, 1987) is an American author known for The Darkest Minds series and Passenger series.

== Early life ==
Alexandra Bracken was born in Phoenix, Arizona, where she later returned after living in New York City for many years. She graduated from Chaparral High School in 2005, and attended the College of William & Mary in Williamsburg, Virginia, graduating magna cum laude with a degree in History and English in May 2009. She worked in the children's publishing industry in New York City, first as an editorial assistant and then in marketing.

== Career ==
Bracken wrote her first unpublished novel as a college freshman, and began her debut novel, Brightly Woven, as a birthday present for her friend during her sophomore year when she was nineteen. In their review of the book, Publishers Weekly dubbed Bracken "a debut author to watch." Her debut placed third in the 2010 GoodReads Choice Awards for Best Debut Author.

In 2012, Disney Hyperion published the near-future, young adult thriller The Darkest Minds, the first book in the eponymous series. In 2018 The Darkest Minds was adapted into a feature film.

On November 13, 2014, Bracken was announced as the writer for Star Wars Episode IV A New Hope: The Princess, the Scoundrel, and the Farmboy, a novelization of Star Wars Episode IV: A New Hope. Bracken replaced R.J. Palacio who dropped out due to scheduling conflicts.

Passenger was released in January 2016, and its sequel Wayfarer was released in January 2017. Both books debuted at #1 on The New York Times bestsellers list.

Her novel Lore has been optioned for film by Universal Pictures with Joe Shrapnel and Anna Waterhouse attached to write the screenplay.

== Bibliography ==
=== Series ===
==== The Darkest Minds series ====
1. The Darkest Minds (December 18, 2012)
2. Never Fade (October 15, 2013)
3. In The Afterlight (October 28, 2014)
4. The Darkest Legacy (July 31, 2018)

===== Novellas =====
1.5. "In Time" (July 16, 2013)

2.5. "Sparks Rise" (September 2, 2014)

3.5. "Beyond the Night" (October 6, 2015)

===== Short stories =====
- "Liam's Story" (January 11, 2016)
- "Vida's Story" (January 11, 2016)
- "Clancy's Story" (January 11, 2016)

===== Film adaptations =====
- The Darkest Minds (2018), film directed by Jennifer Yuh Nelson, based on novel The Darkest Minds

==== Passenger series ====
1. Passenger (January 5, 2016)
2. Wayfarer (January 3, 2017)

==== The Dreadful Tale of Prosper Redding series ====
1. The Dreadful Tale of Prosper Redding (September 5, 2017)
2. The Last Life of Prince Alastor (February 5, 2019)

==== The Star Wars Illustrated Edition Trilogy series ====
- Episode IV A New Hope: The Princess, the Scoundrel, and the Farmboy (September 22, 2015)

==== Silver in the Bone series ====
1. Silver in the Bone (April 4, 2023)
2. The Mirror of Beasts (July 30, 2024)

=== Standalone ===
- Brightly Woven (March 23, 2010, ISBN 978-1-60684-038-2)
- Lore (January 7, 2021)
- Immortal Rose (August 18, 2026)

=== Collections ===
- Through the Dark (October 6, 2015) novellas:
  - "In Time"
  - "Sparks Rise"
  - "Beyond the Night"
- The Rising Dark: A Darkest Minds Collection (March 2, 2016) short stories:
  - "Liam's Story"
  - "Vida's Story"
  - "Clancy's Story"

=== Graphic novels ===
- Brightly Woven: The Graphic Novel (February 2, 2021)
