= The Darkest Minds (novel series) =

Young adult series by Alexandra Bracken

- The Darkest Minds; Never Fade; In the Afterlight; The Darkest Legacy
- Author: Alexandra Bracken
- Country: United States
- Genre: Dystopian fiction
- Publisher: Hyperion Books for Children / Disney Publishing Worldwide
- Published: 2012–2018
- Media type: Print (hardback & paperback); Audiobook; E-book

The Darkest Minds, written by American author Alexandra Bracken, is a young adult dystopian fiction series consisting of four novels and several novellas compiled in Through the Dark.

The series was first published in the United States in 2012 by Hyperion Books for Children, an imprint of Disney Publishing Worldwide. The first novel, The Darkest Minds, spent eight weeks on The New York Times Best Seller list for a children's series, peaking at number three.

== Books ==
The series follows a teenage girl named Ruby, a 16-year-old girl with special abilities that she has only just begun to understand. It takes place during the aftermath of a fictional disease known as 'IAAN' which killed most of the children in the United States and left the surviving children with supernatural abilities.

=== The Rising Dark ===
The Rising Dark: A Darkest Minds Collection, published January 11, 2018 by Quercus Children's Books, is a collection of short stories that take place before The Darkest Minds.

=== The Darkest Minds ===
The Darkest Minds, published December 18, 2012, is the first novel of the series. The novel's and series' title was changed from Black is the Color to The Darkest Minds in November 2011.

Ruby breaks out of a "rehabilitation camp" in which she has been imprisoned and teams up with a rag-tag group of fellow camp escapees to find the Slip Kid, a leader who offers shelter to young people in danger and who knows the secret to control one's powers.

It received positive reviews from Booklist, Publishers Weekly, Common Sense Media, and Kirkus, as well as a mediocre review from The Guardian.

==== Accolades ====
- Lincoln Award Nominee (2016)
- YALSA's Popular Paperbacks for Young Adults Top Ten (2016)
- Goodreads Choice Award for Young Adult Fantasy & Science Fiction nominee (2013)

=== In Time ===
In Time, published July 16, 2013, is a short story that bridges the gap between the first and second novels of the series.

Kirkus Reviews stated, "The intricate plot and diverse cast of recurring and new characters make this book difficult to fully appreciate as a stand-alone. But after reading the first two books, readers will be left clamoring for the third."

=== Liam's Story ===
Liam's Story is a short story that falls between The Darkest Minds and Never Fade, and tells the story from Liam's point of view.

=== Never Fade ===
Never Fade, published October 15, 2013, is the second book in the series. It follows Ruby as she learns to control her abilities, reunites with her friends, and fights back against the government that wants to imprison them.

=== Sparks Rise ===
Sparks Rise, published September 2, 2014, is a novella that connects Never Fade to In The Afterlight and The Darkest Legacy.

=== In the Afterlight ===
In The Afterlight, published October 28, 2014, is the third book in the series. It received a positive review from Booklist. As Ruby and her friends fight for a place in the world, they formulate a plan to rescue the children trapped in the so-called rehabilitation camps.

=== Beyond the Night ===
Beyond the Night, published December 18, 2017, is a novella that takes place between In the Afterlight and The Darkest Legacy.

=== Through the Dark ===
Through the Dark, published October 6, 2015, is a collection of short stories that take place before The Darkest Legacy.

=== The Darkest Legacy ===
The Darkest Legacy, published July 31, 2018, is the fourth novel of the series. It received a positive review from Booklist.

== Film adaptation ==
In 2011, film rights for the series were optioned by Twentieth Century Fox produced by Shawn Levy under 21 Laps. In 2014 it was announced that Twentieth Century Fox had acquired the rights to The Darkest Minds and in 2018 it was adapted into a feature film.
