= Leah Renee Cudmore =

Canadian actress and singer

- Born: October 1, 1985 (age 40); Toronto, Ontario, Canada
- Occupations: Actress, singer
- Years active: 1996–2019
- Partner: Nick Zano (2014–present)
- Children: 2

Leah Renee Cudmore (born October 1, 1985), often credited as Leah Cudmore or Leah Renee, is a Canadian actress and singer.

== Early life ==
Cudmore was born in Toronto, the oldest of two children to Christopher Cudmore, an oral surgeon.

== Career ==
Cudmore has had recurring roles in television series including MVP, Runaway and Blue Mountain State. As a voice actress, she has performed in series including Franklin and Growing Up Creepie. In 2011, she acquired notoriety co-starring "Bunny Alice" in the NBC series The Playboy Club. In 2013, she starred as Maggie Bronson on the Canadian sitcom Satisfaction.

=== Music ===
As a singer, in February 2009, she released her first single, "iBF (Imaginary Boyfriend)". Some months later, she also released her debut CD, Storybook, composed of eleven pieces, her first single included. She co-wrote all songs of her first album.

== Personal life ==
Cudmore is in a long-term relationship with actor Nick Zano. They have a son born in July 2016, and a daughter born in 2018.

== Filmography ==
Year	Film	Role	Notes
1997–2004	Franklin	Beaver (voice)	39 episodes
1998	Stickin' Around	Melody (voice)	Episode: "Christmas of Doom"
2000	Franklin and the Green Knight	Beaver (voice)	Television film
2001	Anne of Green Gables: The Animated Series	Pea Pod (voice)	Episode: "A Question of Rules"
2002	Witchblade	Debbie Buck	Episode: "Emergence"
2003	Jasper, Texas	Brandi Eggleson	Television film
2003	Back to School with Franklin	Beaver (voice)	
2006	Franklin and the Turtle Lake Treasure	Beaver (voice)	
2006	Growing Up Creepie	Chris-Alice Hollyruler/Spider (voices)	10 episodes
2007–2008	Atomic Betty	Regeena (voice)	5 episodes
2007–2010	Busytown Mysteries	Various voices	12 episodes
2010–2011	Blue Mountain State	Kara the Cheerleader	5 episodes
2011	The Playboy Club	Alice	7 episodes
2013	Satisfaction	Maggie Bronson	13 episodes
2014	Love By The Book	Emma Graham	Television film; aka Mr. Fiction
2014	Grimm	Bella Turner	Episode: "Heartbreaker"
2016	The Best Thanksgiving Ever	Sarah	
2016	A Snow Capped Christmas	Claire Benson	Television film; aka Falling For Christmas
2019	Sailing into Love	Claire Richards	Television film; aka Five Summer Weddings (final acting role)
