= Isen =

Isen may refer to:

- Isen, Bavaria, a town in Germany
- Isen, Kagoshima, a town in Japan
- Isen (river) in Bavaria, Germany
- The fictitious River Isen in Tolkien's literature
- ISEN, a group of three French higher education establishments
- Nissae Isen, actor
- Tajja Isen, actor
