= Gudule =

Gudule is the main character of a series of French children's books published by Hachette-Jeunesse, authored by Fanny Joly and illustrated by Roser Capdevila. They were what inspired the Bravo Gudule (retitled Miss BG in English) television series.

== Titles ==
Titles in the series include:

- Bébé attaque Gudule
- Bébé enlève ses couches
- Bébé et le Docteur Gudule published 1999
- Docteur Gudule published 2007
- Gudule a un bébé
- Gudule baby-sitter
- Gudule et les bébétes
- Gudule garde bébé
- Gudule la propreté
- Gudule maîtresse d'école
- Gudule part en vacances
- Joyeux Noël, Gudule ! published 2006
- La cuisine de Gudule
- La folle soirée de Gudule
- La propreté selon Gudule
- Le "niversaire" de Gudule published 2001
- Un bébé pour Gudule
- Un bébé ? Quelle drôle d'idée !

Only 2 do not have Gudule's name in the title.

== See also ==
- Saint Gudula
