= Miss BG =

French television series

- Also known as: Bravo Gudule
- Genre: Children's; Fantasy; Comedy; Educational; Family; Adventure
- Created by: Fanny Joly; Roser Capdevila
- Based on: Gudule by Fanny Joly
- Directed by: Philippe Vidal; Jessie Thompson (voice director)
- Voices of: see below
- Theme music composer: Lenz Entertainment; Kevin Gillis; Jack Lenz; Tajja Isen (singing)
- Opening theme: "Miss BG Theme"
- Ending theme: "We Got the Move"
- Countries of origin: France; Canada (Ontario)
- Original languages: English; French
- No. of seasons: 2
- No. of episodes: 52

Production
- Executive producers: Kevin Gillis; Ira Levy; Peter Williamson; Robert Rea; Marie-Pierre Moulinjeune
- Producers: Kevin Gillis; Robert Rea
- Editor: Lou Bouniol
- Running time: 27 minutes
- Production companies: Ellipsanime; Breakthrough Films & Television; Def2shoot

Original release
- Network: France 5 and Tiji (France); TVOntario and TFO (Canada)
- Release: 8 October 2005 – 18 March 2008

Miss BG (short for Big Girl) is a 3-D animated series based on the French children's book series "Gudule" written by Fanny Joly and illustrated by Roser Capdevila, published by Hachette-Jeunesse. The original English version was later dubbed in French under the title Bravo Gudule.

The title was copyrighted in 2004 and production began in 2005.

It is a joint Canadian/French production and is distributed by Breakthrough Animation. Fifty-two 30-minute episodes (each having 2 stories, also aired separately as 104 episodes of 15 minutes) have been produced to date. The developers also described it as having two seasons with each having 52 13-minute episodes, 2 26-minute specials and 24 2-minute fillers.

== Synopsis ==
BG is an energetic redhead girl who hangs out in a tree house with two friends.

== Characters ==
=== Main family ===
- Bella Gloria "BG" Baxter is 7 and later 8 years old. BG is a redheaded girl who is curious about everything around her and plunges head-on into adventures and escapades. She's a natural leader amongst her friends, even though she can be slightly bossy at times. She's also a bit of a tomboy, and loves to hang out with her best friends Gad and Alex in their tree house. BG is protective of her little brother George, but can lose patience with him too; especially when he insists on playing with her and her "grownup" friends all the time.
- George Baxter is BG's adorable younger redheaded brother. George looks up to his older sister and always wants to play with her and her friends, especially in the tree house. George tries to be like BG at times, copying her words and actions, and her approval is very important to him. Sensitive and sweet-natured, George is less self-confident than BG, but his insights into people and situations can sometimes be surprising. He is 3 and later 4 years old, and watches a TV program called "Fishy the Fish".
- Albert (nicknamed Albie) is George's beloved pet hamster who travels around perched on George's head.
- Jeffrey Baxter (Nicknamed Dad) Baxter Redheaded like his children, good-natured and easygoing, Dad is the local vet. He's aware that BG has him wrapped around her finger. He usually says "yes" to anything while watching TV and on the rare occasion when he says "no," a few tears will work wonders. Still, Dad has his breaking point, and when he makes up his mind, no one can change it.
- Charlotte Baxter (Nicknamed Mom) is the brunette mother of BG and George who works from the house as a freelance journalist who writes articles. She is always busy trying to juggle her career while looking after her family and her younger sister. She's warm, sympathetic and more understanding of her daughter than BG realizes, but she is tough. She doesn't lose her temper very often, but when she does, even BG runs for cover.
- Aunt Alice: Aunt Alice is Charlotte's (younger?) sister. She spends a lot of time at BG's house and loves to spend time with BG and George and do projects with them when their parents are out. She's BG's favorite babysitter.

=== Others ===
- Alex is one of BG's best friends. He has blonde hair and wears a shirt with green and white stripes and wears red glasses. He often hangs out with BG in the treehouse.
- Gad Mansour is a black boy and, along with Alex, one of BG's best friends, but he's a little shy and quieter than both BG and Alex. But BG knows she can always count on him to help find a solution to any problem. Gad is a science whiz, loves studying and inventing things. He lives with his grandmother and father, who owns a local grocery store.
- Brittany-Ann McAdams is BG's wealthy, blonde next-door neighbor – and sometimes nemesis or rival. Rich, arrogant, spoiled, and pretty, Brittany-Ann thinks she's very special and loves to brag to BG and to her friends. She constantly competes for attention from the other kids. Underneath Brittany-Ann's spoiled persona, she hides a glimpse of insecurity. Her vain preoccupation with her looks is in marked contrast to BG's tomboyish approach to life. She wears her curly blonde hair in a low ponytail with a white hair tie, an orange-red shirt with a white collar, a green and red plaid skirt, white knee socks and red strapped shoes.
  - Brittany-Ann's mom is named Mrs. McAdams. Her father is not mentioned.
  - Doodlebug is Brittany-Ann's pet dog. She sometimes shortens her names to Doodles.
- Terri is the black-haired babysitter of BG and George when their aunt is not available. She's studying at college but she loves to spend time with the kids. She especially likes dancing with BG, who has learned a lot of steps from her. Terri also likes baking cakes for BG and George and especially loves it when they show her their drawings.
- Ouma Mansour is Gad's grandmother, who lives with him and his Dad. She takes care of all the housework and cooking for them, and she tends a vegetable garden behind the family grocery store. BG likes to seek Ouma out when she needs help.
- Billy is (at 9 or 10-years-old,) is a brown-haired boy and the oldest in his and BG's class, and so he thinks the rest are all babies. Billy is great at skating and he likes to show off his skills to BG and all her friends. He also has a crush on Brittany-Ann. Billy is Kayla's brother.
- Kayla is Billy's brunette younger sister. She is also Brittany-Ann's best friend and she is often with her. She often does everything Brittany-Ann tells her to, much to BG's disdain. She wears her brown hair in pigtails, a light green long sleeved shirt, a purplish-pink jumper and dark green leggings with purplish-pink shoes.
  - Titus is Kayla's female hamster who resembles George's hamster, Albert, and sometimes they can't tell them apart.
- Mr. Ahmed Mansour is Gad's father and Ouma's son.
- Robbie is Alex's blonde older brother. He and Terri are often together.
- Mrs. Martin a blonde-haired math and science teacher who is also the homeroom teacher for BG, Gad, Alex, Brittany-Ann, Kayla & Billy.
- Mr. Tyrone Grant is the school principal who also teaches gym and occasionally substitutes for BG, Gad, Alex, Brittany-Ann, Kayla, and Billy. He has a dog named Mitzi. He also runs a toy drive in "Show and Tell".
- Ian is George's friend.
- Alex's dad, the blonde-haired father of Alex and Robbie.

== Cast ==
=== Credited ===
- Bella Gloria "Miss BG" Baxter: Hannah Endicott-Douglas
- George Baxter: Nissae Isen
- Alex: Billy Rosemberg
- Gad Mansour: Cameron Ansell
- Brittany Ann McAdams: Rebecca Brenner
- Charlotte Baxter: Susan Roman
- Jeffrey Baxter: Neil Crone
- Aunt Alice: Stephanie Morgenstern
- Terri: Leah Cudmore
- Robbie: Bill Houston
- Billy: Darcy Smith (season 1) and Jordan Devon (season 2)
- Kayla: Melanie Tonello
- Mr. Mansour: Juan Chioran
- Ouma: Dawn Greenhalgh
- Mr. Grant: Martin Roach
- Mrs. Martin: Catherine Disher
- Mrs. McAdams: Laura de Carteret

=== Uncredited ===
- Ron Pardo – Captain Shimmer
- Robert Tinkler – Alex's Dad
- Robin Duke – Ian
- John Stocker – Mr. Otis
- Ron Rubin – TBA
- Tracey Moore – Malinda

== Episodes ==
The series has 102 segments spread among 52 episodes, with 2 apiece.

Season 1 is 52 episodes of 13 minutes each.

Ep #	Episode Name	Synopsis	TVO debut date
1a	Miss BG Gets a Good Pet	When BG accidentally breaks George's sculpture, she blames it on George's hamster, Albert, but is dismayed when an angry George gives Albert "away" to BG.	8 October 2005
1b	Miss BG VS. the New Babysitter (aka "Miss BG vs. the Babysitter" on TV guides	BG tests out Terri, the new babysitter, but soon discovers that Terri has some very cool talents!	9 October 2005
2a	Neighbourhood Stars	BG discovers Brittany-Ann has won a contest to be on BG's favourite cereal box.	15 October 2005
2b	Miss BG and the Snake	Dad brings home a snake from his vet clinic and warns BG not to touch it, but when Alex convinces her to take a peek, the snake escapes!	16 October 2005
3a	Aunt Alice’s Birthday	It is Aunt Alice's birthday and BG's mom and dad are throwing her a party. Her parents are giving Alice a jeweled bracelet, which BG thinks is ugly. Her dad agrees to let BG wrap it up and so BG lets George hold on to it while she looks for wrapping paper. George plays with Albert using the bracelet and Albert gets stuck in it. Aunt Alice is about to come to the house!	22 October 2005
3b	Miss BG Gets a Valentine	BG, Alex, Gad and George are playing soccer when they spot a Valentine's Day advertisement. BG hates Valentine's Day but when Brittany-Anne boasts about her many cards, candy, and flowers, BG says that she gets many of them too. BG now needs to get a valentine so she thinks that wearing a skirt is the way. She puts on a pink dress and wears it in front of Alex and Gad and comments on how nice it would be if her friends got her a big box of chocolates. The next morning she doesn't find anything and storms up to the treehouse, not wanting to play with her friends. Brittany arrives to mock BG but Brittany's mom only announces Valentine's from her grandmother. George then tells BG she has mail and it turns out she did get chocolates. After determining that Alex and Gad didn't send them, she asks Gad's father who he sold them to. After he relents it was an older boy, BG wonders if Robbie sent them. Mr. Mansour then specifies it wasn't, and that his name begins with B. BG offers to give the chocolates back to Billy, saying it wouldn't work out between them. He accuses her of stealing them, and gives them to Brittany. Returning home, George finally admits he took them because they were sitting on Brittany's steps all alone. After this is explained to Brittany, she admits she left them out there because she didn't like cheap corner-store chocolates, and lets George have them, who shares them with BG, Gad and Alex.	23 October 2005
4a	Sleepover	Aunt Alice is spending the night and BG is excited about having a sleepover party with her - until BG learns she will be sharing a room with George instead.	29 October 2005
4b	Hocus BG	When BG cannot resist the urge to practise with some of Aunt Alice's magic equipment she becomes increasingly worried that she may have made George and Albert disappear for real!	30 October 2005
5a	Party Contest	It is Halloween and BG's having a party! But when she doesn't invite Brittany-Ann, her nemesis decides to throw a party of her own.	5 November 2005
5b	Aliens Nightmares	BG disobeys her parents' orders and watches a scary movie on TV.	6 November 2005
6a	Three New Little Brothers	BG and George revert to babyish behaviour.	12 November 2005
6b	A Bet’s a Bet	A desperate BG bets the toy robot Aunt Alice gave her and George - and loses!	13 November 2005
7a	What a Team	BG's excited about the Neighbourhood Olympics, until she learns she has to be George's partner.	19 November 2005
7b	Amnesia	After watching a medical show on TV, BG gets the idea to fake amnesia to get out of trouble.	20 November 2005
8a	The Perch	When BG believes she is wrongfully accused of something George did, she decides to perch out in her tree house until she's proven innocent - until she discovers she really was guilty.	26 November 2005
8b	Operation Albert	When Albert escapes under BG's supervision, she is desperate to find him before George discovers he's missing.	27 November 2005
9a	Fortune Cookies	At a fundraising fair at school, a jealous BG makes fun of Brittany-Ann's cookies, which are the hit of the fair.	3 December 2005
9b	Monkey Thief	When BG loses Alex's new video game, she pretends that it has been stolen by an escaped monkey.	4 December 2005
10a	BG Feels Guilty	George and BG accidentally break a vase that Aunt Alice has given Mom, and they concoct a plan to fix it.	10 December 2005
10b	Potted Plant	As a school assignment, the kids are given potted plants to care for. But BG neglects her plant in favour of skateboarding lessons.	11 December 2005
11a	Magic Box	BG mistakenly opens Brittany-Ann's gift when it is accidentally delivered to her house in the mail, and she tries to wrap it back up before anyone finds out.	17 December 2005
11b	The Soap Box	BG and her friends decide to sell Dad's old soapbox racer in the neighbourhood garage sale.	18 December 2005
12a	The Assignment	When BG and George believe that their favourite baby-sitter is moving to Australia, they attempt to make her change her mind by giving her the best baby-sitting experience in the world.	24 December 2005
12b	The Painting	Dad is painting a portrait of Mom to auction off for an animal charity.	25 December 2005
13a	My Dad 00BG	BG is on a mission! She's infiltrating her house to expose possible spies that may be lurking.	31 December 2005
13b	My Cousin is a Star	BG wants to see her favorite pop star, Malinda! Unfortunately, BG's dad wasn't able to get tickets.	1 January 2006
14a	Don’t Believe a Word Albert Says	When Brittany-Ann baby-sits Kayla's hamster, Titus, she plays a trick on the other kids which convinces them that Titus can do math.	7 January 2006
14b	Dirty Papers	When BG tricks George into cleaning up the mess she's left in the living room, he may have accidentally thrown out one of Dad's important tax papers.	8 April 2006
15a	Secrets	BG and Alex have fun as reporters gathering "scoops" for the magazine they've started.	8 April 2006
15b	George’s Party	BG is horrified when George invites Billy to his birthday party.	9 April 2006
16a	BG Goes To The Movies	BG lets the other kids believe that she has seen a scary grownup film at the local cinema, but then Brittany-Ann insists that BG prove it by telling everyone the plot.	9 April 2006
16b	The Report Card	BG thinks her top mark for essay writing is a mistake and tries to prevent her parents from throwing a celebration party.	15 April 2006
17a	Princess BG	BG wants to be a princess in a play but gets jealous when she realizes it is the witch that is the starring role which Brittany-Ann is playing.	15 April 2006
17b	Lucky Wheels	BG finds a set of new skateboard wheels in the trash and becomes convinced that they will bring her luck at an upcoming skateboard competition. Then she gets lazy and stops practicing.	16 April 2006
18a	Photo Album	BG scrambles to organize a photo shoot with Gad and Alex to replace an embarrassing baby picture of her that Mom is planning to print in a national magazine.	16 April 2006
18b	TV Curfew	When BG's TV privileges are withdrawn for a week, she struggles to find other ways to amuse herself.	22 April 2006
19a	Adopted Sister	Brittany-Ann starts competing with BG for George's affection, causing BG to realize how much she loves her little brother.	22 April 2006
19b	Game Plan	BG gets a new board game and is eager to find opponents to play.	23 April 2006
20a	Patience	BG persuades George to let her borrow a pair of roller blades that he has won by convincing him that she can help make his feet grow faster.	23 April 2006
20b	George’s Security Blanket	When George won't give BG a movie ticket she wants, BG retaliates by hiding his security blanket in her toy hot air balloon ...	29 April 2006
21a	Brittany-Ann’s Lost Diary	BG finds Brittany-Ann's lost diary and believing that she is now privy to new insights, BG starts to be nice to her old rivals. But all is not what it seems.	29 April 2006
21b	Missing Mom	BG doesn't want to be treated like a kid. So when Mom gets sick, BG seizes the opportunity to take over Mom's chores to prove she can handle more responsibility.	30 April 2006
22a	School Project	BG constructs an excellent paper bird for a school project. But when she tries to share her expertise with her best friends, it leads to misunderstandings and hard feelings.	30 April 2006
22b	Last Card	BG is obsessed with a series of collectible trading cards.	6 May 2006
23a	Perfect Girl	BG mounts a campaign to be the most perfect daughter in the world in order to get tickets to a pop concert from her parents.	6 May 2006
23b	Like Peas In a Pod	To avoid being laughed at, BG invents an identical looking cousin to take the fall.	7 May 2006
24a	Promises, Promises	BG makes too many promises and almost lets everyone down.	7 May 2006
24b	Detective BG	A friend's pastries go missing and BG turns detective to find them.	13 May 2006
25a	High Security Treehouse	After BG discovers their clubhouse has had an intruder, she goes overboard as she upgrades its security system.	13 May 2006
25b	Dad’s Big Blunder	When Dad accidentally ruins BG's old rag doll, he assumes that BG is devastated and starts giving her special treats to make it up.	14 May 2006
26a	Pick Me!	BG and Alex both want Gad to go with them to two different events happening on the same weekend. But Gad can't seem to make a decision and gets caught in the middle of a tug-of-war.	14 May 2006
26b	Hard Lesson	BG volunteers to drum up attendance to a charity talent show. She works hard but takes little care of herself. On the night of the event she’s not feeling well and it looks like she might not be able to attend and see her favourite magician.	20 May 2006
27a	Show n' Tell	After BG embarrasses herself by accidentally bringing her teddy bear to school, she rashly decides to throw it away - and quickly lives to regret it.	3 September 2007
27b	Shooting Stars	BG's defense of Kayla in front of Brittany-Ann makes Kayla BG's new best friend. But the new friendship threatens Alex and Bg's secret plan to assemble a telescope for Gad.	4 September 2007
28a	Pocket Garden	BG and her friends learn that there's strength in numbers when they all compete to see who can make the best pocket garden.	5 September 2007
28b	Hand and Foot	BG sprains her hand and foot in a soccer game and a guilty Gad and Alex wait on her hand and foot - long after BG has secretly recovered.	6 September 2007
29a	Pool Party	BG persuades her parents to buy an inflatable swimming pool for their backyard, but her impatience causes a big splash.	7 September 2007
29b	BG's Paranoia	BG thinks her friends are planning to exclude her from a party and decides a cutout figure is her new best friend.	10 September 2007
30a	Height and Fright (alternately Height and Freight)	BG suddenly discovers she has vertigo.	11 September 2007
30b	A Charming Hostess	BG is horrified when Brittany-Ann must spend the night at her house.	12 September 2007
31a	Mom's Vacation	BG wants her mom to bake a clafoutis so that she - BG - can win a cake contest.	13 September 2007
31b	BG's Audition	BG drops Gad and Alex because she is determined to win a dance contest.	14 September 2007
32a	Not a Word	BG takes a vow of silence for three days when Brittany-Ann accuses her of talking too much and wanting to be the centre of attention. She makes an interesting discovery when she forfeits her speaking role in the school play and plays a tree.	17 September 2007
32b	Bump in the Night	BG plays a trick to scare Gad and Alex with a mechanical monster. But she ends up scaring Ouma too.	18 September 2007
33a	The Pants	Aunt Alice finds an old pair of her beloved childhood pants and gives them to BG. BG takes them, even though they are not her style. But when other kids make fun of the garish pants, BG gives them away to a charity sale. But BG must quickly get them back, when Aunt Alice turns up unexpectedly at the neighbourhood picnic. With a little help from Aunt Alice BG learns that style is individual.	19 September 2007
33b	BG's Mysterious Past	BG thinks her real parents are royalty! She lets her new 'princess' status go to her head, but ends up missing her real friends and family, even before she realizes she's not a princess.	20 September 2007
34a	Class Representative	BG uses her role as class helper to snoop, and ends up accidentally ruining Brittany-Ann's science project, a volcano.	21 September 2007
34b	Share and Share Alike	BG, Gad and Alex are supposed to share a special prize they won together.	24 September 2007
35a	Snow Day	BG promises George she'll help him make a snowman. But Brittany-Ann makes a bigger, more impressive snowman.	25 September 2007
35b	Snow Sculpture	When BG is teamed up with Billy for a school project to design an original snow sculpture, she is convinced he will bully her into doing it the way HE wants.	26 September 2007
36a	Holiday Tree House	At Christmas time, Brittany-Ann's Mom convinces the City to cut down the tree house and put up a tennis court. Horrified BG and her friends try to sell Brittany-Ann on the idea of keeping the tree house by inviting her up to play with them, so that she will convince her Mom to save it. But the plan backfires, until BG learns that the unexpected support of a community on Christmas Eve can save the tree.	24 December 2007
36b	Best Christmas Ever	BG fights to keep Alex in town for an important hockey game on Christmas Eve when he finds out he must leave for his Dad's house early and miss the game. BG learns that being a divorced kid can be difficult over the holidays.	25 December 2007
37a	My Fair BG	Favors are exchanged to maintain a soccer team and a fashion show while siblings Kayla and Billy travel with their father. When BG and the boys agree to be models in Brittany-Ann's fashion show, BG is horrified to find she actually likes it.	6 March 2008
37b	Dad's Birthday	BG tries to make a special surprise dish for Dad's birthday, but gets so busy with it, Dad begins to think she doesn't want to spend time with him.	12 March 2008
38a	IQ	When BG takes an IQ test, the results reveal she's a genius, and the idea of being a "big brain" goes to her head.	13 March 2008
38b	George's Allergy	George suddenly starts sneezing every time is he around BG, who fears that he has grown allergic to her and is on a mission to find out why.	14 March 2008
39a	Picture Perfect	BG wants to take the "perfect" family photo, so she agrees to follow Brittany-Ann's advice.	17 March 2008
39b	George's Painting	BG mistakenly hands in one of George's paintings as her own work for a class project. Then the teacher wants to exhibit it in public.	18 March 2008
40a	Gift Swap	When Brittany-Ann comes down with a stomachache, after BG unwittingly gives hamster food, BG thinks she's poisoned her and does everything she can to make amends.	9 October 2007
40b	Favourite Aunt	Aunt Alice gets a job at Mr. Mansour's store, and BG thinks she'll have much time to play with her.	10 October 2007
41a	A Pet Is Not a Toy	BG warns George not to treat Albert the way Brittany-Ann is treating her new poodle - like a toy. But then George stops playing with Albert altogether.	11 October 2007
41b	Night with Ouma	When Ouma volunteers to babysit BG and George, Gad worries that Ouma will show BG his embarrassing baby pictures.	12 October 2007
42a	Teacher's Pet	BG feels "weird" when her parents strike up a friendship with Mr. Grant, her gym teacher and principal. But, the situation only worsens when he substitutes for her usual teacher.	15 October 2007
42b	Boys and Girls	Billy's boys only sleepover in the clubhouse, and this inspires BG's girls to only sleepover in a tent.	16 October 2007
43a	Mother's Day	BG's class plans to throw a Mother's Day party to read their poems, but BG is worried that Gad is upset because he doesn't know his mother.	17 October 2007
43b	Crystal Ball	Desperate to figure out what Alex and Gad are up to when they start doing things without her, BG tries to get them to 'fess up by using a "crystal ball" to convince them she has psychic powers.	18 October 2007
44a	Doctor BG	While her veterinarian father is away, BG and her friends find an injured bird.	19 October 2007
44b	Fishing Trip	BG is thrilled to be included on one of her Dad's fishing trips. But her delight is spoiled by the last-minute addition of George to the party.	22 October 2007
45a	The Creature	BG convinces her father to let her and her friends go camping with him in the hopes they can secretly capture a photo of a mysterious forest creature, or so they think.	23 October 2007
45b	All About BG	To her great thrill, BG and her family are the subjects of a documentary Terri is doing for school. But things go wrong when BG lets 'fame' go to her head.	24 October 2007
46a	Jumping to Conclusions	BG doesn't study, and isn't prepared to win a camping badge she desperately wants. When she and Brittany-Ann cheat, BG realizes that it is better to pay attention and earn one's way.	25 October 2007
46b	Forest Badge	When BG mistakenly thinks Gad is moving, she and Alex are forced to go to great lengths to prevent it. Embarrassing herself at a supposed farewell dinner, BG finds out she is mistaken, learning the folly of jumping to conclusions.	26 October 2007
47a	The Piano Lessons	When Brittany-Ann’s Mom overhears BG’s Dad playing Chopin on the piano, she mistakenly thinks it is BG playing. BG is too embarrassed to tell her the truth, that she is just learning to play, and gets caught up in a game of deception when she agrees to play a difficult duet with BA. BG learns that there is no shame in being a beginner at a new skill – all it takes is hard work and commitment.	29 October 2007
47b	Oh Brother	BG fears George is their mother's favourite kid, so she starts competing with him for their father's affection before learning her parents love both their children equally.	30 October 2007
48a	Alex's Glasses	When BG accidentally breaks Alex's glasses just before a school outing to a dinosaur park, she tries to make amends by giving him a fake pair to wear so that Mr. Grant won't keep Alex home. But Alex is so near-sighted that he gets into big trouble on the trip, and BG learns that it is better to admit a mistake right away, rather than try to hide it.	31 October 2007
48b	Mommy's Girl	When BG's Mom and Brittany-Ann's Mom accompany the kids on a school trip to a wilderness reserve, BG and Brittany-Ann compete to see who's got the coolest mom. But BG's attempts to show off how cool her Mom is keep getting wrecked by George. BG tries to keep George away from Mom but ends up thinking she lost him in the forest and when BG and Brittany-Ann go looking for him they end up lost! BG learns that being cool isn't always the most important thing.	1 November 2007
49a	Super Secretary	Mom is sick in bed with the flu, but she has an important deadline at work. BG quickly volunteers to help, but when Aunt Alice arrives, BG has some unwanted competition as Mom's "super secretary".	2 November 2007
49b	Ants and Trouble	Inspired by Dad, BG sets out to be a great animal rescuer. Her first mission- to save an anthill from Ouma's garden, even if it means transporting the ants to her bedroom! Meanwhile, Mom's cartons of eggs keep disappearing mysteriously. It doesn't take long for Mom and Dad to realize something's up when the house is covered in ants and the eggs are nowhere to be found.	5 November 2007
50a	Broken Telephone	When BG learns that her Mom's taking a short business trip to Africa, she uses the exciting news as an excuse for not doing her homework. The ruse backfires when her slightly exaggerated version of the trip passes from person to person and gets blown way out of proportion! BG needs to fix the 'broken telephone' and set things right.	6 November 2007
50b	Luckie Scrunchie	When Terri chooses BG, Brittany-Ann and Kayla for a television interview about "Girls Of Today", the latter two think BG looks too childish for such a mature interview. BG gets rid of her hair scrunchies in favor of a Brittany-Ann approved outfit. With a little help from Terri, who loves wearing scrunchies BG learns she's the most mature just being herself.	7 November 2007
51a	Trendiest Trend	Yobi-Bobo cards become the latest trend at school and BG trades her (and George's) marbles to get her hands on some. But when a new trend becomes more popular, BG is not sure what to do. Gad and Alex help her realize it is more important to do what you like, not follow the latest trend.	8 November 2007
51b	A Friend for George	Mom suggests that BG let George play with her and her friends while they build their Karpla design for a competition, BG quickly convinces Mom that it would be better for George to invite a friend over. BG thinks the two friends will keep each other entertained, and away from her plans with Gad and Alex. BG quickly learns that babysitting TWO kids is a lot more work than she thought, especially with a fragile Karpla design to protect!	9 November 2007
52a	Community Spirit	BG and her friends put their community spirit to the test when they compete for a chance to paint a mural on the community centre wall, that they all must agree on.	12 November 2007
52b	Neighbourhood Fair	BG learns that helping out can be as important as winning when she agrees to help Dad with the neighbourhood street fair, and gets so busy helping everyone with their displays, she does not have time for her own.	13 December 2007

== ASK BG shorts ==
Miss BG Vignette episodes are 2-minute "Lessons" or "Tips" given to the audience by BG. These ‘tips’ are factually correct and have underlying social development themes; the humour lies in how BG executes them. Things do not go exactly the way she plans. BG speaks directly to camera, addressing the audience. Her TV lessons interact with a future website, which kids can then access to receive further info.

Ep #	Episode Name	Synopsis
1	The Doggy Duty	BG and George do a trial run of caring for Doodlebug, BA's Dog. BG and George show us what dogs need most –love.
2	The Perfect Present	BG and George help Brittany-Ann’s find the perfect present for her Mom. Together, the kids learn that the best presents are homemade.
3	Better Than You	BG and Brittany-Ann duel over who can do things better than who. This light hearted song has the girls feuding over everything from who’s faster, to who jumps further, to who can sing louder than who; just an average day for these two competitors.
4	Handle With Care	BG shows her friends how to look after and respect other people’s things.
5	Energy Saver	BG gives George tips on saving energy around the house - but soon learns that you have to consult your family first!
6	Team Spirit	Kayla doesn’t think she is good at soccer so BG offers her expertise. BG takes time to show Kayla some soccer tips, and in the process learns that having good sportsmanship is more important than winning.
7	Bedtime	BG tries to help George stay up past his bedtime to watch a Belinda concert on TV. Together, BG and George learn that honesty is the best policy.
8	Showtime	BG shows George and his friend Ian how to behave at the movies. However, when BG gets carried away, Terri has to remind her how to behave.
9	Skater Kidz	BG shows Aunt Alice all the beginners’ tips for Skateboarding while Billy shows off his skills. BG covers all the important safety tips. Together, they learn that safety and having fun are the most important parts of Skateboarding.
10	Super Smoothie	BG helps Alice to get George to eat his fruit by making her favorite snack - her "Super Smoothie". Through a fun song, George learns that smoothies are healthy, fun, and tasty!
11	Spic and Span	Gad seeks BG & Alex's help. They rush over and see his room is a complete mess. They begin cleaning without talking to Gad. After putting everything away, they soon found out that Gad had all these things out to give to charity!
12	Waste Not	BG shows Gad, her mom and Brittany-Ann what you can do with reused shopping bags, jars, cans. BG shows us that someone's waste might just be someone else's treasure.
13	Dress It Up	BG tries to show George how to decorate his room to make it cool. In the end, BG has gone a little overboard and George doesn’t even recognize his room! BG and George learn that the real cool thing is to just be you.
14	Star Student	BG shows Billy how to be a great student. But wait, she gave Mr. Grant the wrong assignment. Through her tips, she learns that being a good student is paying attention to everything.
15	Friends Forever	BG shows Gad and Alex how to make up, after having a falling-out. The two best friends soon realize that apologizing and being nice can help good friends’ make-up.
16	Ex-Ex Exercrise	BG and Brittany-Ann do their exercises only to discover that dancing with friends counts as exercise too. With a great song and dance, the girls show us that exercise can be fun.
17	Camp Day	BG gives Brittany-Ann tips for the perfect family outing. Brittany-Ann learns that you have to be prepared to improvise and the most important thing about a Camping trip is having fun with your friends and family.
18	Step by Step	BG helps George build a model plane and learns that it's important to follow directions carefully and not rush new projects.
19	Flu Fighters	Brittany-Ann is afraid of getting sick. BG and George show her all the ways to stay healthy and to prevent getting sick.
20	The Party Manners	Billy learns how to behave himself at Brittany-Ann's surprise. After BG makes a mess and talks with her mouth full, she starts to realize that she should follow her own tips!
21	Doggy Duty	BG and George do a trial run of caring for Doodlebug, BA's Dog. BG and George show us what dogs need most –love.
22	Hamster in my Hair	Miss BG’s little brother, George, takes us on a musical journey of friendship with a little help from his hamster and best friend, Albert. From George’s point of view we hear his struggles of being small, but the ability to overcome them when you’ve got a best friend, who’s always there.
23	Sleepover Party	BG plans a sleep-over party. She shows us all the important things to plan for a sleep-over. But she forgot the most important step - get permission from Mom and Dad before inviting all your friends!!
24	Christmas Tree	BG’s family decorates their Christmas Tree together, safely, in anticipation of Santa Clause’s arrival.

== Production ==
Development for Miss BG began in April 2004, when Canadian entertainment company Breakthrough Film & Television, under its animation arm Breakthrough Animation, joined forces with French publishing house Dargaud's Paris-based animation subsidiary Ellipsanime, to produce a CGI-animated adaptation of the Gudule book series. Ellipsanime's founder Robért Rea would serve as executive producer, and worldwide distribution was to be handled by Breakthrough and Dargaud's distribution arms. In April 2005, Canadian broadcasters TVOntario & French-language network TFO and France-based educational channel France 5 had agreed to broadcast the adaptation of the book series in their home countries.
