= The Berenstain Bears (2002 TV series) =

Canadian children's television series

- Genre: Children's series; Educational
- Created by: Stan and Jan Berenstain
- Based on: Berenstain Bears by Stan and Jan Berenstain
- Written by: David Wiebe (Treehouse TV Writer)
- Directed by: Gary Hurst
- Voices of: Camilla Scott; Ben Campbell; Michael Cera; Michael D'Ascenzo; Tajja Isen; Corinne Conley; Les Carlson; Amanda Soha; Marc McMulkin
- Theme music composer: Stan Meissner
- Opening theme: "The Berenstain Bears" by Lee Ann Womack
- Ending theme: "The Berenstain Bears" (instrumental)
- Composers: Ray Parker; Tom Szczesniak
- Countries of origin: Canada; Hong Kong
- Original language: English
- No. of seasons: 3
- No. of episodes: 40 (80 segments) (list of episodes)

Production
- Executive producers: Michael Hirsh; Scott Dyer; Steven Ching; Stan and Jan Berenstain
- Producer: Lan Lamon
- Running time: 30 minutes
- Production companies: Nelvana Limited; Agogo Entertainment Limited

Original release
- Network: Treehouse TV (Canada); PBS Kids (USA)
- Release: September 9, 2002 – September 12, 2003

Related
- The Berenstain Bears (1985 TV series)

The Berenstain Bears is a children's animated educational television series aimed at preschoolers based on the children's book series of the same name by Stan and Jan Berenstain, which focuses on the lives of a family of anthropomorphic bears who learn a moral or safety-related lesson during the course of each episode. The series functions as a revival of the 1985–87 cartoon series of the same name, but unlike its predecessor, it is co-produced by Nelvana Limited and Agogo Entertainment, produced in association with Treehouse TV (Canada) and PBS (United States).

Premiering on September 9, 2002, a total of 40 episodes were produced, with the series airing until September 12, 2003.

== Premise ==
The series is set in a forested land populated only by anthropomorphic bears and primarily focuses on the title Berenstain Bears. The Berenstain Bears are a family residing in the rural community of Bear Country. The family consisted of Mama Bear, Papa Q. Bear, Brother Bear, and Sister Bear.

Although numerous episodes are based on the books and promote the same morals as encouraged in the picture books from which their plots originated, the program's faithfulness to the original series is slightly mixed on account of a number of later episodes following original storylines.

Nonetheless, they mostly portray the same circumstance depicted in the original Berenstain Bears storybooks quite accurately and concentrate on the messages and lessons learned by the family through their different experiences, such as generosity and responsibility, as well as the daily lives of the bears.

== Voice cast ==
=== Main ===
- Camilla Scott as Mama Bear
- Benedict Campbell as Papa Bear
- Michael Cera (episodes 1-26) and Michael D'Ascenzo (episodes 27-40) as Brother Bear
- Tajja Isen as Sister Bear

=== Recurring ===
==== Family ====
- Leslie Carlson as Grizzly Gramps
- Corinne Conley as Grizzly Gran
- Marc McMulkin as Cousin Fred

==== Friends ====
- Amanda Soha as Lizzy Bruin
- Nikki Marshall as Queenie
- Mark Rendall as Ferdy Factual
- Gage Knox as Too-Tall
- Billy Rosemberg as Skuzz
- Patrick Salvagna as Smirk
- Maryke Hendrikse as Hillary

==== Citizens ====
- Chris Wiggins as Squire Grizzly
- Ellen-Ray Hennessy as Miss Grizzle
- Philip Williams as Farmer Ben

== Episodes ==
Season	Episodes	Originally released	
Season	Episodes	First released	Last released
1	13	September 9, 2002	October 30, 2002
2	13	September 30, 2002	February 18, 2003
3	14	April 25, 2003	September 12, 2003

== Production and music ==
On January 14, 2002, Nelvana Limited and Berenstain Enterprises, the company of authors Stan and Jan Berenstain, announced they had entered into a worldwide deal to allow Nelvana to produce new content featuring the Berenstain Bears characters, including on television, straight-to-video, and individual releases; along with global merchandising and licensing rights to the franchise. The first project under the deal would be an animated television series for PBS Kids which would premiere in the autumn as part of an hour-long weekday morning strand of Nelvana programs, also including new episodes of Seven Little Monsters and George Shrinks (both originally from Bookworm Bunch). Nelvana would also secure a US home video deal with Columbia TriStar Home Entertainment to release the series on VHS and DVD starting in 2003.

The series was co-produced by Nelvana and Hong Kong animation studio Agogo Entertainment, and aired on PBS Kids and Treehouse TV. Eighty 15-minute episodes were produced, adapted from the books and also a few new stories as well, similar to the 1985 incarnation.

Due to Canadian laws requiring Nelvana to employ Canadian writers and designers, the Berenstain couple's involvement in the program was limited; they sought to exert their influence on some details, according to Stan: "Our bears don't wear shoes, and Papa wouldn't wear his hat in the house...And we try to keep complete, total banality out of the stories". Common practicalities of animation did force some minor costume changes from the books, such as eliminating polka dots and plaids (this issue also occurred in the past animated series and specials, and only a limited amount of polka dots was allowed in the five specials).

The series is supposed to supplement the 1980s series because new books were released since then, even though the two incarnations have a thoroughly different production style as well as a change of in-universe elements. Another issue is the two series are not seen together. Missing was Honey Bear, a toddler cub who never appeared in the TV series.

After its ending seven years later, 20 episodes of the series were dubbed in Lakota language and aired under the title "Matȟó Waúŋšila Thiwáhe" on PBS stations in the Native Dakotas starting on September 11, 2011.

== Broadcast and home media ==
In Canada, the series first aired on September 9, 2002, on Treehouse TV and French-language Ici Radio-Canada Télé. In 2010 until 2013, it also briefly aired on YTV as part of the short-lived "YTV Playtime" block.

It first premiered in the United States on PBS on January 6, 2003. Initially, it aired together with Seven Little Monsters (originally part of the "PBS Kids Bookworm Bunch") in a shared half-hour timeslot, but two shows were eventually separated. The original broadcast run on PBS ended September 10, 2004, and with reruns continuing through February 1, 2009,^{a} along with Sagwa, the Chinese Siamese Cat and Zoboomafoo. The series continued to air in reruns on select PBS stations (such as KLCS) through September 8, 2025.

Starting in September 2005, reruns aired on PBS's new, preschool-aimed, digital cable channel, PBS Kids Sprout (later known simply as "Sprout"), from its inception up until the channel rebranded into Universal Kids on September 9, 2017, after Sprout's rights to air the series expired.

In the mid-2000s, Sony Pictures Home Entertainment (formerly Columbia TriStar Home Entertainment) released the series on both VHS and DVD in the United States. In the late 2010s, PBS released more DVDs of the series.

All of the series was also released on both VHS and DVD by kaBoom! in Canada. As of 2025, the series is also available on Treehouse Direct^{b} and to stream on Amazon Prime.

Currently, the series ever streamed on PBS Retro.

== Accolades ==
Year	Award	Category	Recipients and nominees	Outcome
2004	Gemini Awards	Best Pre-School Program or Series	Stan Berenstain, Jan Berenstain, Michael Hirsh, Steven Ching, Scott Dyer	Nominated
2004	Young Artist Awards	Best Performance in a Voice-Over Role – Young Actress	Tajja Isen	Nominated

== Notes ==
a. National repeats on PBS ended.
b. With Family Segments On YouTube.
