= List of The Berenstain Bears (2002 TV series) episodes =

The Berenstain Bears is a Gemini Award-nominated animated television series based on the children's book series of the same name by Stan and Jan Berenstain.

== Series overview ==
Season	Episodes	Originally released	
Season	Episodes	First released	Last released
1	13	September 9, 2002	October 30, 2002
2	13	September 30, 2002	February 18, 2003
3	14	April 25, 2003	September 12, 2003

== Episodes ==
All episodes were directed by Gary Hurst. Episodes from Season 1-2 were co-directed by Hurst.

=== Season 1 (2002) ===
Note: In the United States, all the episodes in season 1 (except for "The Homework Hassle" and "Go To Camp") aired alongside Seven Little Monsters on PBS Kids. Beginning in fall 2003, all 26 episodes were paired with another Berenstain Bears episode.

No. overall	No. in season	Title	Directed by	Written by	Original air date (Treehouse TV)	U.S. air date (PBS)
1a	1a	"Trouble At School"	Scott Glynn & Gary Hurst	Brian Lasenby	September 9, 2002	January 6, 2003
When Brother returns to school from being sick for a few days, he forgets about the makeup work he was supposed to do and fails his test as a result of not doing it, so he hides his test from Mama & Papa. The next day, Brother decided not to go to school, feeling upset for the mess. When he realizes his error, he asks Gramps for advice; Gramps then shows him a sunken wagon from a long time ago, when Gramps made a mistake himself. After the story, Brother decided to go to Mama and Papa who sign his test after he apologizes for hiding it from them, and he returns to school.
1b	1b	"Visit The Dentist"	Scott Glynn & Gary Hurst	Brian Lasenby	September 9, 2002	January 6, 2003
One morning, Sister wakes up a loose tooth who then shows it to Brother and he believes that the dentist will pull it out with yankers which scares Sister. Brother soon has his own tooth problem: He ate a piece of candy and slammed it in his mouth too hard and causing himself to have a cavity. When Mama finds out, she schedules a dentist appointment for both of them.
2a	2a	"Mama's New Job"	Gary Hurst & Kervin Faria	Bruce Robb	September 11, 2002	January 7, 2003
When other bears motivate Mama to start a business, she plans to open up a quilt shop in an old store. Papa and the cubs try to protest, but Mama comforts them that that is what happens to all mama bears who have jobs. Papa and the cubs are left with Mama's chores and soon they get them done in no time. Mama is then proud of them and thanks to their help, she manages a grand opening of her quilt shop. That night, after Mama locks up the shop, Sister remarks that every bed in Bear Country must have a quilt of hers on it, and Mama agrees, saying the mayor ordered three. As they leave, Papa initially suggests they celebrate with a bowl of "Bear Family Late Night Stew", to which Mama suggests they go to Beartown Burger for supper instead, and says it is her treat; Papa and the cubs wholeheartedly agree with the idea.
2b	2b	"Mighty Milton"	Gary Hurst & Kervin Faria	Peter Sauder	September 11, 2002	January 7, 2003
Too-Tall and his no good gang always taunt Brother because he has talent in his favorite sports: soccer, basketball, and baseball. One day, a new cub named Milton Chubb comes to school and Too-Tall and his gang discover Milton has no talent in soccer, basketball, and baseball. Luckily, Brother gets him situated in a sport that he has talent in: wrestling.
3a	3a	"Go To School"	Scott Glynn & Gary Hurst	Bridget Newson	September 13, 2002	January 8, 2003
During back-to-school shopping at the mall, Too-Tall and his gang make Sister not want to start third grade because they (supposedly) had bad memories. So to make Sister feel good enough to try going into third grade, Mama brings up a memory of when Sister was originally afraid of going into kindergarten, but changed her mind when she tried it and she loved it. So Sister tries third grade and she likes it; when Brother asks if third grade was not that much harder, Sister replies it was a bit harder, but she guesses she is just getting smarter. Brother says it is too bad Too-Tall cannot say the same, as he got his peashooter and comic books confiscated by the teacher. Meanwhile, Papa tries his hand at making an apple pie; when Sister asks, "You made a pie, Papa?" Papa replies, "Yep. I figured if Sister can try something new, then so can I." He also confesses, "And you know what? It wasn't very tricky after all. It was as easy as... well, pie."
3b	3b	"The Week At Grandma's"	Scott Glynn & Gary Hurst	Erika Strobel	September 13, 2002	January 8, 2003
Mama and Papa are going on their 2nd honeymoon to the Grizzly Mountain Lodge, so they drop off Brother and Sister for a week at Gran and Gramps' house. Brother and Sister realize that Gran and Gramps are fun and they like their visit. Mama and Papa did not have such a good time on their honeymoon. It turns out the honeymoon has changed since the last time they were there. It is fully automated, there is a dog who likes to run off with tennis balls on the tennis court, a bee who buzzed by Papa on their canoe ride managed to make him knock over their picnic lunch, the meals have been turned very small, and the ballroom dancing hall has a heavy metal band instead of calming music.
4a	4a	"Trouble With Pets"	Gary Hurst & Kervin Faria	Brian Lasenby	September 14, 2002	January 9, 2003
One day, Brother and Sister want to get a puppy from Farmer Ben and learn the big responsibility of taking care of a pet. They name the puppy Little Lady and soon they forget about taking care of her as they go off to play with friends. When they return home, Little Lady have chewed up the living room so Little Lady had to live outside. Brother and Sister apologize to Mama and Papa and promise to take care of it from now on.
4b	4b	"The Sitter"	Gary Hurst & Kervin Faria	Bob Ardiel	September 14, 2002	January 9, 2003
One evening, Mama and Papa have to attend a meeting, so Brother and Sister are left with Mrs. Grizzle. But the cubs have an accident earlier in which Brother hits his best baseball into her yard and they run out of her yard before she catches them. The cubs get up the courage to apologize to her for what they did to her yard, and she forgave them, while also giving Brother back his baseball; she then says she knew it was Brother, as she knows every cub in the neighborhood, and also says nobody likes a cold shower, but she got over being hit with the sprinkler. When they offer to help fix what they did, she gladly agrees, saying, “It’s a deal.” Back at the meeting, Papa prepares to give his speech, but Mama tells him that she could not get an answer from home, and drags Papa with her out of the town hall. At home, Brother, Sister, and Mrs. Grizzle are looking at constellations until Mama and Papa return. Sister tells Papa everything that happened, and Mama realizes she and Papa ran home for nothing after learning the cubs were fine. Mrs. Grizzle takes Brother and Sister into the house for a bedtime story; when Mama asks Papa if they should go back to the meeting, Papa admits, “You know, I’m so tired, I forgot what I was all fired up about.” Mama replies with, “Oh?” and Papa then says, “What do you say we get a couple of chairs, set them under the cubs’ window, and listen to Mrs. Grizzle’s bedtime story?” Mama agrees with the idea.
5a	5a	"Too Much TV"	Scott Glynn & Gary Hurst	Laura Kosterski	October 30, 2002	January 10, 2003
One Saturday, the cubs seemed more interested in watching cartoons all day than getting outside. After squabbling over the remote, they along with Papa are not allowed to watch TV for a week due to Mama’s orders. The cubs try to fill the time with other things to do, and Papa tries not to turn on the TV to watch the hockey playoffs.
5b	5b	"Trick or Treat"	Scott Glynn & Gary Hurst	Ben Joseph	October 30, 2002	January 10, 2003
On Halloween night, the cubs chose not to visit Widder Jones' house on Crooked Lane because they believe she is a witch. But Mama insist that they visit her and soon they discover she is really a kind person, as she offers them candy apples; when Brother commends her on her Halloween decorations, Widder Jones says Halloween is her favorite time of the year. She also offers to help scare Too Tall and his gang away, and when she proposes for Brother to play the final prank on them, he gladly accepts.
6a	6a	"Trouble With Money"	Gary Hurst & Kervin Faria	Dawn Parish	September 16, 2002	January 13, 2003
Brother and Sister want one thing more than anything else: Bear Air Jackets. When Mama and Papa cannot afford to buy them, they tell the cubs to make their own money to get them. There is one problem: they cannot hang out with their friends because they are too busy. So Brother and Sister have to make up with their friends.
6b	6b	"Double Dare"	Gary Hurst & Kervin Faria	Ben Joseph	September 16, 2002	January 13, 2003
One day, Sister asked Brother to get her jump rope from Too Tall who took it from her. Too Tall does return it but wants Brother to join him which leads to forcing Brother to steal watermelons from Farmer Ben. Luckily, Farmer Ben assures Brother he will not call Brother's parents, and tells Brother that chickens are not very bright, but they know the difference between right and wrong, whereas sheep do not think for themselves and are always following the leader. When Brother runs into Too Tall and his gang, Brother fends off being dared three times about going to the Widder Jones' house, and walks away. Too Tall and his gang are surprised at Brother walking away from a "dee double dare" and calls him a chicken. Farmer Ben appears and tells Too Tall and his gang if they are caught stealing watermelons again, he will report them to their parents and tell them to go home; the gang apologizes and thanks Farmer Ben, and Too Tall pleads with him not to call their parents and he and his gang ran away. Farmer Ben chuckles and says Too Tall and his gang make his chickens look tough.
7a	7a	"Out For The Team"	Scott Glynn & Gary Hurst	Laura Kosterski	September 18, 2002	January 14, 2003
One day, Papa asks Brother to join the town's baseball cub league but Sister also wants to join too. Sister also has better baseball skills than Brother so Brother tries to work on improving his skills for tryouts.
7b	7b	"Count Their Blessings"	Scott Glynn & Gary Hurst	Bridget Newson	September 18, 2002	January 14, 2003
Brother and Sister are jealous of friends who seemingly have everything, but what they do not know is, they should count their blessings by enjoying what they already have. And that is a good thing because a storm brews outside the tree house, and the inside of the tree house is protecting them.
8a	8a	"Slumber Party"	Gary Hurst & Kervin Faria	Nicole Demerse	September 20, 2002	January 15, 2003
One day, Lizzy invites Sister to a slumber party at her house and Sister has to learn from Mama about privilege and responsibility. But soon Sister lets the words slide when more cubs want to come and Lizzy allows them. On the big night, Mama and Papa forgot the Bruins were not home and left Lizzy with a sitter. The party gets so out of control with half of the cubs in the neighborhood that when the Bruins came home, they called off the party and send the other cubs home. Mama is upset at Sister for not comprehending her words, but Papa explains to Mama that responsibility and privilege also goes to parents. Sister then calls all her friends to help clean up the mess they made. When Lizzy says they make it a "clean-up party" since they are doing such a good job, Sister replies with, "Let's not, Lizzie. If you don't mind, I'd rather not hear the word 'party' again, for a long, long time."
8b	8b	"The Homework Hassle"	Gary Hurst & Kervin Faria	Bob Ardiel	September 20, 2002	January 15, 2003
When Brother spends all day after school goofing off instead of doing his homework, Papa takes away his TV time, music listening, talking on the phone, and his video games till he has caught up with his homework. Brother goes to see Gran and Gramps who tell him when Papa was Brother's age, he spent all his time goofing off instead of doing his homework and Gramps took away Papa's privileges to goof off. Brother then discovers why Papa was so hard on him. Papa is falling behind on his taxes. They both understood an important lesson and decided to catch up on their separate work.
9a	9a	"The Talent Show"	Scott Glynn & Gary Hurst	Ken Cuperus	September 21, 2002	January 16, 2003
One day, Teacher Bob wants Brother to be the talent scout to find some people who have talent for the talent show. Brother found some people who have talent but there is one person whom he cannot find who can sing beautifully. When he found the mystery singer, it was Too Tall and at first he refuses to sing in the talent show, but changes his mind and agrees to.
9b	9b	"The Haunted Lighthouse"	Scott Glynn & Gary Hurst	Dawn Parish	September 21, 2002	January 16, 2003
The Bear Family decided to go visit the Rocky Island Lighthouse for an overnight stay and soon Brother and Sister discover a green bear walking and discover that it is Captain Salt, the original lighthouse keeper. Captain Salt plans to leave town and go somewhere else, but the Bear Family want him to stay and so he turns the lighthouse into a museum.
10a	10a	"The Birthday Boy"	Gary Hurst & Kervin Faria	Steven Wright	September 23, 2002	January 17, 2003
Brother Bear is going to be 10 years old on his birthday, and Sister needs a family member to write about for a project at school, so she chooses him. Sister decides to make a movie about Brother and in the movie, she chooses him for a hero and the best brother she could ever have, and soon she gives the movie as a present to Brother for his birthday.
10b	10b	"The Green-Eyed Monster"	Gary Hurst & Kervin Faria	Bruce Robb	September 23, 2002	January 17, 2003
One day, Brother has outgrown his bike and Sister has been giving his old bike as a hand-me-down. When Brother returns from the bike shop, his new bike is super cool that Sister wants to ride it. Papa tries to explain to Sister that it is too big for her but Sister is still mad. That night, she meets the Green-Eyed Monster and it pressures her in the morning to ride Brother's bike. But just like Papa says, she can not even almost barely reach the pedals and so Brother has to stop her before his bike is destroyed.
11a	11a	"The Baby Chipmunk"	Scott Glynn & Gary Hurst	Alice Prodanou	September 25, 2002	January 20, 2003
One day, Sister finds a baby chipmunk all alone with no mother. She really wants to take care of it till the mother returns but Papa tells her that chipmunks do not belong in the house but lets her keep it till the mother returns. Sister names the chipmunk Brown Eyes and soon she loves it and wants to keep it forever. One morning, Brown Eyes becomes a normal chipmunk and soon it tells Sister that it wants to be released outside. Sister is sad at first but soon Brown Eyes returns with his mother and becomes close friends with Sister.
11b	11b	"The Wishing Star"	Scott Glynn & Gary Hurst	Dave Dias	September 25, 2002	January 20, 2003
One night, the Wishing Star comes and Mama explains to Sister that you can wish for anything you want. First, Sister wishes for her birthday gift, a teddy bear she sees in the toy store which comes true. Next, Sister wishes for a good grade on her math test. Then, Sister wishes that she can ride a horse from Farmer Ben but soon she learns that wishes on the Wishing Star do not always come true.
12a	12a	"Get The Gimmies"	Gary Hurst & Kervin Faria	Jennifer Pertsch	September 27, 2002	January 21, 2003
Brother and Sister believe that they can get to anything they want to at the supermarket, which causes a problem for their parents. When Gran and Gramps come to visit, the kids start begging for more stuff instead of greeting them which leads to getting a timeout in their room for their bad behavior. To teach them a lesson, Gran and Gramps share a story about Papa's past as a greedy child. After learning how Papa changed by sharing his toy truck, Brother and Sister begin to understand the importance of considering others and stopping their greedy behavior.
12b	12b	"Lost In A Cave"	Gary Hurst & Kervin Faria	Ken Cuperus	September 27, 2002	January 21, 2003
The Bear Scouts have to go cave-exploring to earn their merit badge in cave-exploring. Brother and Sister are excited but not Cousin Fred who is scared of caves. Soon, Brother and Sister get Cousin Fred to face his fears.
13a	13a	"Too Much Junk Food"	Scott Glynn & Gary Hurst	Ben Joseph	September 28, 2002	January 22, 2003
Papa decides to enter the Bear Country Run like he did last year but soon he discovers his performance is not as good as it used to be. The cubs try to help him but soon their performance is the same as Papa. Luckily, Dr. Grizzly suggests that they should not eat junk food and start eating healthy foods in time for the race.
13b	13b	"Go To Camp"	Scott Glynn & Gary Hurst	Bridget Newson	September 28, 2002	January 22, 2003
A week after school has been let out for summer break, Mama encourages Brother and Sister to go to day camp in which they enjoy. One day, Grizzly Ted announces for a sleep out on the last day of camp which Sister is scared of going to so she asks Lizzy for help in which the two sleep outside for a night and in the morning, Sister is not scared of the sleep out and soon she enjoys it.

=== Season 2 (2002–03) ===
No. overall	No. in season	Title	Directed by	Written by	Original air date (Treehouse TV)	U.S. air date (PBS)
14a	1a	"The Excuse Note"	Gary Hurst & Kervin Faria	Brian Lasenby	September 30, 2002	July 14, 2003
Sister and her friends hate one thing about school: gym. It is not even in the gymnasium, it is in their classroom and all they do is exercise which make them hot, sweaty, and sore afterwards. The only thing to get out of it is to get hurt and have one parent make an excuse note to get them out of gym. One day, Sister gets off the bus and twists her ankle so Mama writes an excuse note for her to get out of gym. Sister enjoys having relaxing time but soon her ankle gets better and she has to remove her bandage. After Mama explains that gym is good for her, Sister starts to get better at gym so Teacher Jane lets her lead the class in the one thing the class hates: the duck walk.
14b	1b	"On The Job"	Gary Hurst & Kervin Faria	Sheila Dinsmore	September 30, 2002	July 14, 2003
Brother's assignment is to write about what he wants to be when he grows up but he does not have a clue on what job he wants. So he and Cousin Fred go around Bear Country to find jobs that are interesting. They are many jobs that are great, but he can not find one. So in his paper he writes that they are many different jobs and that he has lots of time to choose one. Luckily, Teacher Bob approves his assignment. Note: This is the only episode where Sister Bear is absent.
15a	2a	"Too Small For The Team"	Scott Glynn & Gary Hurst	Bridget Newson	October 11, 2002	July 15, 2003
One day, Sister wants to join a girls' soccer team but she is too young to attend. The coach has only one position available for her: team manager. At first, Sister finds it tiring but Brother persuades her to work harder and get her jobs done quicker so that she can watch the other cubs play. Sister then has to be an understudy when one of the cubs is out sick and she manages to win the soccer game for the team.
15b	2b	"The Jump Rope Contest"	Scott Glynn & Gary Hurst	Dawn Parish	October 11, 2002	July 15, 2003
One day, Sister is chosen to represent the school's jump-roping contest. She finds it fun to do until a cub named Alice is also in the contest and she is a real pro. So Sister practices real hard and in the contest, she finds out that she is tied with Alice in 2nd place and the real winner is another cub.
16a	3a	"The Bad Habit"	Gary Hurst & Kervin Faria	Brian Lasenby	October 14, 2002	July 16, 2003
Sister's class has been working on fractions for a while and it gets her nervous so she nibbles her nails. When the bad habit gets on and on, Brother teaches her fractions and soon she stops biting her nails and puts on nail polish when they grow back when she shows them to Lizzy.
16b	3b	"The Prize Pumpkin"	Gary Hurst & Kervin Faria	Ben Joseph	October 14, 2002	July 16, 2003
Papa has been working extra hard to get his big pumpkin: The Giant in the pumpkin growing contest, not knowing the true meaning of Thanksgiving is to give thanks, not beat the pants off someone. He has been competing with Farmer Ben against his big pumpkin: The Monster. In the end, it reveals that the Monster is bigger than the Giant so Farmer Ben wins and the Giant does not even come in 2nd, Mrs. Grizzle's pumpkin turn out to be closer to the Monster so the Giant came in 3rd. Even though, Papa is sad that he did not win but Mama and the cubs reassure him that he will try again next year and soon the Bear Family enjoys a nice Thanksgiving dinner.
17a	4a	"Ferdy Factual"	Scott Glynn & Gary Hurst	Steven Wright	November 4, 2002	July 17, 2003
A new cub is starting his first day at Brother and Sister's school. He is Professor Actual Factual's super smart nephew Ferdy Factual. Ferdy will be rather interesting in reading books and playing chess alone than watch sports. Soon, one of his chess moves was very helpful in the next football game.
17b	4b	"Lend a Helping Hand"	Scott Glynn & Gary Hurst	Brian Lasenby	November 4, 2002	July 17, 2003
One day, Brother and Sister have eaten their time to play with their friends to help Widder Jones with chores. That evening, Widder Jones calls them to help her clean her attic. Brother and Sister want to decline, but Mama and Papa insist that they help her and their plans can wait till another time. The next day, when they are cleaning her attic, the cubs discover old things that Widder Jones has and want to keep them. Soon, with their stuff to get rid of, they decide to sell it in a yard sale.
18a	5a	"The Big Blooper"	Gary Hurst & Kervin Faria	Brian Lasenby	November 6, 2002	July 18, 2003
One day, Sister and Lizzy watch a video targeted at a teenage audience called "Trouble at Big Bear High" about a basketball game. The video has a foul word in it called "furball" on what Sister and Lizzy do not realize that it is not a nice word. They accidentally use it on Millie and Stacy and at the dinner table, Sister spills the word on Brother. When both Sister and Lizzy realize that the word is a foul word, they make amends with Millie and Stacy and at bedtime, Sister almost spills it again on Brother before correcting herself by saying "Fur-ry Brother."
18b	5b	"Nothing to Do"	Gary Hurst & Kervin Faria	Bridget Newson	November 6, 2002	July 18, 2003
One day, the cubs are bored and Mama suggests they help her with her chores. The cubs at first decline but see that Papa and Mama will be busy all day doing chores, they decide to secretly help them without them knowing. Once all the chores are done, the cubs surprise them with a picnic and reveal to be the secret chore helpers.
19a	6a	"House of Mirrors"	Scott Glynn & Gary Hurst	John de Klein	November 8, 2002	July 21, 2003
Due to a misunderstanding that she has big ears, Sister runs home and covers her ears with a hat. Mama tries to help her with her appearance by taking her to the carnival's house of mirrors. Sister then sees that bears come in different sizes and shapes. Then she looks in the last mirror, and discovers it does make her ears look big.
19b	6b	"Too Much Pressure"	Scott Glynn & Gary Hurst	Bruce Robb	November 8, 2002	July 21, 2003
The Bear family has been very busy with extracurricular activities and have not found any time to squeeze with Gran and Gramps or fixing the family car. So Papa organizes a schedule to keep them on time with their daily activities. But the next day, it turns into a big disaster when Mama becomes tearfully distraught to find out that she forgot to get the car fixed with the cubs also crying. So Papa calls off everything and restarts their schedule and puts other things at a different time. With the schedule organized again, they have time to play together, visit friends, and sometimes doing absolutely nothing at all.
20a	7a	"Visit Fun Park"	Gary Hurst & Kervin Faria	Ben Joseph	November 11, 2002	July 22, 2003
One day, Mama surprises Papa and the cubs with tickets to the amusement park in which Brother and Cousin Fred are excited to ride the biggest, fastest, coolest roller coaster called the Thunderbolt. When they arrive, Brother is not so sure about going when he sees other cubs have an aftermath dizziness from getting off the ride. Brother stalls their way on the Thunderbolt with other things until he confesses that he is not ready and it makes Cousin Fred get off the ride; as for Papa, the ride takes off with him still in the front car. After the ride, Papa is too dizzy to do anything and decide to rest till it is time to go.
20b	7b	"The Perfect Fishing Spot"	Gary Hurst & Kervin Faria	Steven Wright	November 11, 2002	July 22, 2003
Today is Gran and Gramps' wedding anniversary and the Bear Family are getting it ready with the best dinner ever. Papa is getting them a big fish from the perfect fishing spot he can find and Sister tags along with him. But everywhere they go, the fish is too small and has to be thrown back and one fish they find is the perfect but it jumps back into the ocean before they could get it. When they go on a boat, they find many fishes jumping on board their boat and the reason for that is because they are in the way of a big ship catching a net of fish underwater. So they resort to one more place: the supermarket. It works, as they found the perfect fish for the perfect dinner.
21a	8a	"The Summer Job"	Scott Glynn & Gary Hurst	John Van Bruggen	February 17, 2003	July 23, 2003
When Brother and Sister have been released from school on their summer break, they decide to spend it helping Farmer Ben on his farm. They like the job a lot and they find many chores to do. It is one problem: Farmer Ben's corn crop has not been growing in a while and it has not been raining for a while. So after a day of dumping water on the crop, it rains the next day and in the autumn, they have fresh corn for a harvest.
21b	8b	"The Big Red Kite"	Scott Glynn & Gary Hurst	Dawn Parish	February 17, 2003	July 23, 2003
The cubs and their friends have found kites for sale at BearMart but see that they are going to be gone if they do not tell their parents to buy them one right now, they will not enter the kite-flying contest. So Brother and Sister rush home to tell Papa they need kites right away but Papa insists that they make a kite instead of buying it. But the big red kite they made is too big and will not get off the ground and into the air as the wind is not strong enough. At the contest, the strong wind comes and now the kite wants to be free so Papa, the cubs, and their friends come to help them and soon the cubs' friends want them to make them a kite for them too. Soon with everyone flying the big red kite, no one won the contest because they all had fun flying the big kite.
22a	9a	"Too Much Vacation"	Gary Hurst & Kervin Faria	Peter Sauder	February 18, 2003	July 24, 2003
The Bear Family is planning to spend a week in a mountain cabin in the Great Grizzly Mountains from their safe, comfortable tree house in the valley. Papa is being predicted the "best vacation ever" but turns into an alpine avalanche. The car blows a tire on the way and Papa had to undo the fastening of the trunk to change the tire in which the tire runs away and when they looked at the view, a skunk made them get back in the car and drive away fast, the cabin is a rundown place and full of leaves and wild animals, the lake is full of weeds, the wild berries turn out to be sour and Papa falls into a stream when he slipped into the water, Papa tried to fish them dinner but the boat sinks when he steps in and his fishing rod's hook gets caught in the weeds, the stew turns out to be terrible from the taste of bark, roots, and leaves, the rain ruins their chance of seeing the sunset, the roof turns out to have holes in the roof when it rains again and the family is kept up to get the leaks in the pots and pans, and a flood from the river goes into the cabin and takes Papa into the lake and in the morning, Papa falls in. Papa plans on heading home, calling the vacation a horrible one; however, the cubs show him it is still the best one with the photos they took of Papa. Papa realizes the cubs are right, along with Mama telling him sometimes the difference between having a bad time and having a good time depends on how someone looks at it. With it, Papa allows the vacation to go on.
22b	9b	"Trouble with Grown-Ups"	Gary Hurst & Kervin Faria	John de Klein	February 18, 2003	July 24, 2003
Mama and Papa have been stressed with quilt orders and a broken jigsaw, and they have been taking out their grumpiness on the cubs when Sister uses the phone to call Lizzy and Brother takes Papa's newspaper to paint. Inspired, the cubs and their friends decide to make their Friday Night play at school about what Mama and Papa did to Brother and Sister. When Mama and Papa find out about this, they decide to be the cubs the next day and the cubs be the parents. But soon, the cubs find it very stressful.
23a	10a	"Go to the Doctor"	Scott Glynn & Gary Hurst	Bridget Newson	February 11, 2003	July 25, 2003
Brother and Sister's little cousin Honey is scared of her very first checkup at Dr. Grizzly's, despite Sister telling her that Dr. Grizzly is really nice. So Sister makes a pretend doctor's office to help Honey get ready for her real one, which Honey likes a lot and is not scared. Dr. Grizzly stops by the tree house that night to give Sister an award for helping Honey with her trip to the doctor's office. In the meanwhile, Papa says that he does not need checkups and that he is fit as a fiddle, but soon catches a cold from not seeing a doctor; Dr. Grizzly suggests that Sister makes sure Papa gets plenty of bed rest and lots to drink, and sternly tells Papa to do what Sister says. When Sister tells him, "Papa, if you did gone to see Dr. Grizzly sooner, you might not be so sick now," he admits, "I didn't think about that." When Brother tells him he had never get sick if he went to the doctor regularly like Sister and himself, Papa admits, "Never? Well, I do not know about that. But maybe it is a good idea to see the doctor once in a while."
23b	10b	"Do not Pollute (Anymore)"	Scott Glynn & Gary Hurst	Dawn Parish	February 11, 2003	July 25, 2003
The cubs have an assignment that they have to show an environmentally friendly Bear Country but there is one problem: there is too much trash, and some of it is in the river. They also see another problem: the bumbleberry trees are endangered because Papa is using the wood to make the Squire's tables. When they tell Papa that the bumbleberry trees are going to be gone, he surprises them with little baby bumbleberry trees; he talks to the Squire into using regular wood instead. Mama and a group of bears are going down to clean out the river.
24a	11a	"The In Crowd"	Gary Hurst & Kervin Faria	Bruce Robb	February 12, 2003	July 28, 2003
A new cub named Hillary comes to school and steals Sister's friends by starting an "in-crowd" with her cooler looks with Sister's friends copying her. Sister tries to be normal, but Hillary dislikes Sister's normal looks. Sister then jumps rope and her friends start to join her, which makes Hillary have a change of heart over disliking Sister's likes.
24b	11b	"Fly It"	Gary Hurst & Kervin Faria	Brian Lasenby	February 12, 2003	July 28, 2003
Brother and Cousin Fred have a science project to do and they picked making an airplane of their own. But many of their attempts backfire with just tossing the paper airplane or adding popsicle sticks to make propellers. Luckily, Sister gives them an idea that makes them use balloon power and lands them a perfect grade.
25a	12a	"By The Sea"	Scott Glynn & Gary Hurst	Jennifer Pertsch	February 13, 2003	July 29, 2003
Brother and Sister are excited of their family vacation to a house by the lake, they really want to go swimming. But Mama insists they stay and clean the house; the cubs initially find it boring, but soon lighten up to it. At the end, the family gets to go swimming, but they have just one more thing to do: wait for Mama and Papa and then they enjoy their time.
25b	12b	"Catch the Bus"	Scott Glynn & Gary Hurst	Laura Kosterski	February 13, 2003	July 29, 2003
Brother's tardiness has been really riding on him, so Mama and Papa give him a watch with alarms set for waking up, being at the bus, and back home for dinner. Brother likes the watch but still manages to be tardy for several things like going to the bookstore to meet Sister's favorite author, and keeping Lenny waiting at the movies. Brother soon learns that it is not best to be tardy, so he does his best to be right on time, even getting to the bus without Sister even knowing.
26a	13a	"Family Get-Together"	Gary Hurst & Kervin Faria	Sheila Dinsmore	February 15, 2003	July 30, 2003
The Bear family are having a family-gathering but not for Papa's family, it is for Mama's family. The cubs get to know their strange cousins Sylvester and Penelope and soon they bond with them over their favorite things.
26b	13b	"The Stinky Milk Mystery"	Gary Hurst & Kervin Faria	Dawn Parish	February 15, 2003	July 30, 2003
Brother and Sister learn not to hide their mistake when they visit Farmer Ben and accidentally let the cows out and what they do not know that the cows are eating onion grass and that makes their milk taste sour. Back home, they learn from Papa that he made a mistake fixing a plumbing issue and let Mama call a plumber. They go to apologize to Farmer Ben and he forgives them and invites them for lunch using the sour milk they had.

=== Season 3 (2003) ===
No. overall	No. in season	Title	Written by	Original air date (Treehouse TV)	U.S. air date (PBS)
27a	1a	"New Neighbors"	Bruce Robb	April 25, 2003	November 17, 2004
When the Kodiak family moves away, a family of bears named the Ursus family takes their place. Papa has trouble accepting the Ursus family because they are different from the Kodiak family. Brother and Sister quickly befriend Aidan and Bonnie, who teach them how to play lacrosse in exchange for playing soccer, while Mama befriends Mrs. Ursus and learns that Mr. Ursus has a sweet tooth just like Papa. As the Bear family eats the fruitcake Mrs. Ursus gives them, Papa learns to accept neighbors for who they are. Suddenly, he takes a liking to Mr. Ursus when he says that his high-speed mower gives him enough time to go fishing, something that Papa enjoys.
27b	1b	"The Big Election"	Bruce Robb	April 25, 2003	November 17, 2004
Papa tries to run for mayor when Mayor Honeypot is not doing anything to address Bear Country's arising issues, though he learns that a part of being a mayor is keeping his promises.
28a	2a	"At the Giant Mall"	John de Klein	April 26, 2003	November 18, 2004
A new mall has opened in Bear Country and the Bear family decides to go and visit it. After entering, Mama sets some rules for her, the cubs, and Papa to make sure that nobody gets lost. Papa disagrees, saying that a woodsbear like him does not get lost. As Mama and the cubs go around looking into and visiting various shops, Papa goes to look for a hardware store, only for him to find himself in the lost cubs station while doing so. Eventually, when Mama and the cubs find him, he admits he does know where he is most of the time, but only when he is in the deep woods or frozen north. He then decides to give up on finding the hardware store, only to change his mind when the cubs and Mama show him that it is right next to the lost cubs station, and says he has to get lost to find what he is looking for. After Papa gets the 1 and 1/2-inch carving set for the table he is making and the Bear family leaves the mall, Brother reminds Papa about Mama's first rule: "Always find something to mark your spot." Papa then apologizes for all the trouble he had caused, admitting he should have listened and obeyed the rules so he would not get lost: "Well, I have learned my lesson. Rules are for everyone. No matter how big or small, rules keep all of us safe."
28b	2b	"The Giddy Grandma"	Dawn Parish	April 26, 2003	November 18, 2004
For her school assignment, Sister has to write an essay on the bear that she admires the most. She gets the idea of going to visit Grizzly Gran and borrow her book titled "100 Most Famous Bears". Instead of using the book, Sister learns more about Gran's achievements, prompting her to write a report about Gran being the bear she admires the most.
29a	3a	"Think of Those in Need"	Brian Lasenby	April 28, 2003	November 19, 2004
When Brother and Sister start to have too much stuff in their room, they decide to donate their old games and puzzles to a retirement home.
29b	3b	"The Hiccup Cure"	Ben Joseph	April 28, 2003	November 19, 2004
When Squire Grizzly asks Papa to make him a chair for Lady Grizzly's birthday, there is one problem: Papa has gotten the hiccups from eating his pancakes too fast. He has also ignored the advice of: "When eating your food, remember to chew. It's not just good manners, it's healthy for you." claiming that it will take too much time. It only takes a visit to Dr. Grizzly's office to get Papa to understand how to control his eating habits.
30a	4a	"Go to the Movies"	Dawn Parish	April 29, 2003	November 22, 2004
Mama notices that the family has not been spending much time together, so she decides to propose an outing. She first proposes a picnic on the second Saturday night, which falls through as Brother, Sister, and Papa all have other things to do. Papa suggests doing something else after their plans are done for the day in which Brother suggests a movie. Instead of going straight to the multiplex, the family searches for Papa's car keys which he finds in the back pocket of his overalls. On the way to the multiplex, Papa has to deliver the Squire's end tables, but is unable to deliver them as he is not home. Mama and Sister pass the time by stargazing. They continue on to the multiplex, but the car runs out of gas, and Mrs. Grizzle, who was out looking for her cat Percy, takes Papa and Sister to get gas for the car. When the family finally arrives at the movie theater, all of the films are sold out, but they realize that they have a special time of their own.
30b	4b	"Car Trip"	Sheila Dinsmore	April 29, 2003	November 22, 2004
Mama and Papa take the cubs on a trip around Bear Country. The cubs, at first, think they are going to Grizzlyland, but Mama and Papa tell them that they are going to visit some of Bear Country's national parks. During their trip, the cubs realize that it is more to a park's history and something that the cubs cannot find at places like Grizzlyland.
31a	5a	"Pet Show"	Bridget Newson	September 1, 2003	November 23, 2004
The cubs want to participate in a pet show, but the rules state that each owner must have a pet. Sister has already entered Little Lady in the contest, leaving Brother to enter the pet show with Gran's pet parakeet.
31b	5b	"Pick Up and Put Away"	Dawn Parish	September 1, 2003	November 23, 2004
Brother works on a birdhouse to earn a Bear Scout merit badge, but after finishing, he trips over his soccer ball and it lands on his birdhouse, breaking it. Mama teaches him and Sister the importance of keeping their things organized. Although Brother does not receive a merit badge for the birdhouse, he does receive a merit badge for organization.
32a	6a	"Hug and Make Up"	Bridget Newson	September 2, 2003	November 24, 2004
On a somewhat boring day, Brother and Sister and their friends decide to put on a circus. When Sister does a bicycle act for the show, Brother somewhat upper hands her on a unicycle. Sister is hurt and wants out of their circus. Once Brother sees that he had hurt Sister's feelings, he goes to apologize to her and offers to teach her how to ride the unicycle before they show their circus to their parents.
32b	6b	"Big Road Race"	Bruce Robb	September 2, 2003	November 24, 2004
One day, Brother, Cousin Fred, and Too-Tall decided to build their own racing car for a big road race. When a young cub named Kenny comes to watch them work, he ends up helping them a lot (especially when he sacrifices his wagon's wheels for the wheels on their car). The three decided that Kenny should be their driver in the race and he ends up winning the race.
33a	7a	"Attic Treasure"	John de Klein & Peter Sauder	September 3, 2003	November 25, 2004
Bear Country is having their history exhibit and a resident of a family has to donate what is important to the history of Bear Country. Only the Bear Family remain and while they are looking in their cluttered attic, they find more history important to their family a lot more and decide to have their own exhibit in the attic. Papa later gets a call from Professor Actual Factual saying that their family dog Little Lady has donated something for the history of Bear Country: A million year old dinosaur bone.
33b	7b	"Moving Day"	Alice Prodanou	September 3, 2003	November 25, 2004
Brother and Sister's other friends, the Bearie cubs (Stewart and Sally) are moving away after the school year ends. Once they told Mama and Papa what has happened, Sister declares that she will never move from their big tree house because she claims they have always lived in it. Mama reveals that the Bear family has not always lived in the big tree house and that they have lived in a cave halfway up Great Bear Mountain at the far edge of Bear Country. Only Papa, Mama, and Brother has but not Sister (as she was not born yet). The reason they moved to the valley was because they have outgrown their cave and the mountain soil cannot grow good trees for Papa's woodworking and Mama's vegetable garden is getting smaller because it is getting up to a rocky ledge. They have no choice but to move away from the mountains and down into the valley into the place they called home (which was a fixer-upper and Mama and Papa took their time to make it perfect). Not long after, Sister was born. After the story, Brother and Sister know that their history would be ceased if they kept living in the mountain cave. For Brother, he would have never been in Teacher Bob's class or have had Cousin Fred as his best friend and classmate or even meeting Stewart Bearie. For Sister, she would have never have been in Teacher Jane's class or have met Lizzy Bruin and became best friends with her or even meeting Sally Bearie. With learning from that, they shared the information with the Bearie cubs and give them the confidence to accept their new home.
34a	8a	"Gotta Dance"	Pamela Slavin	September 4, 2003	November 26, 2004
The Bear Country Spring Fling Jamboree is coming up at Brother and Sister's school and everyone has a dance for the show including Mama and Papa, who are kicking off the show with a dance demonstration. The only one not doing anything for the show is Brother, who claims he cannot dance and thinks he will be humiliated if he screws up on show night. So Papa offers to have him help out for the stage for the show. But soon, Papa is juggling between setting up the stage and practicing with Mama so Brother has to help Mama practice for the show and soon become an understudy when Papa gets into a situation where he is unable to perform.
34b	8b	"The Bad Dream"	Bruce Robb	September 4, 2003	November 26, 2004
One of the Bear family's evening routines is watching Space Grizzlies on TV with a family night snack with it. The show is great but a villain named Sleezo soon scares Sister into having bad dreams when she goes to bed. When she starts getting herself out of watching the show, Mama goes and talks with her and tells her she does not have to watch the show if she does not want to and Sister decides to stop watching the show.
35a	9a	"Say Please and Thank You"	Peter Sauder	September 5, 2003	November 29, 2004
Brother and Sister have been forgetting to say "please" when they ask for something and "thank you" when something is done for them and it starts to get on Mama and Papa's nerves. Brother and Sister have also been noticing their friends have forgetting them too and soon they all learn to say them when they want to ask an grown up for something.
35b	9b	"Help Around the Workshop"	Pamela Slavin	September 8, 2003	November 29, 2004
Papa is on a deadline to make a porch swing for Lady Grizzly's birthday which is tomorrow so Mama cleans up his workshop but soon Papa cannot find the tool he needs and Brother has to run to Mama's quilt shop when she is helping Mrs. Grizzle get material so she can make a quilt for Lady Grizzly's birthday to get Mama to find what Papa is looking for. This proves to be time-crunching so Brother has an idea: To compromise on Papa's view on work (everything out where he can see it) and all tidied up which is Mama's view on work. Soon, Papa finishes the porch swing but learns that the party is actually next weekend, not the next day in which Mrs. Grizzle has mixed up the dates. Soon, Papa and Brother show Mama to have everything out where she can see it but still tidied up.
36a	10a	"White Water Adventure"	Dawn Parish	September 5, 2003	November 30, 2004
Brother and Sister and their friends are going to Bear Country Camp for experiencing white-water rafting. Too Tall and his gang are along with them too but the three learn that pitching up tents or tye-dying shirts are not that easy on their first try and Too Tall claims he does not need any help but he admits to Brother he cannot paddle in a canoe but he wants his friend to help him than Grizzly Ted to prove to Skuzz and Smirk he can do it without a grown up's help and so Brother offers to teach Too Tall how to paddle in a canoe and soon Too Tall gives the skills to Skuzz and Smirk to help them too.
36b	10b	"Showdown at Birder's Wood"	Alice Prodanou	September 8, 2003	November 30, 2004
Teacher Bob's class are beginning a unit on birds and are taking a field trip to Birder's Wood (a forest where most birds live) and to the Bearsonian Institution. Sister and Lizzy also tag along on the field trip too and soon they discover an endangered bird known as a Yellow Poppinjay that is making a nest for its babies. But they find out that Too Tall and his gang are building a tree house in the tree. Knowing that their actions might hurt the bird, they try to convince Squire and Lady Grizzly to shut down Too Tall and his gang's actions but they were not home as they will not be back for a month. Back at home, Papa suggests building a tree house away from the Poppinjay's tree and compromise with Too Tall. Too Tall and his gang agree to the plan and soon, Too Tall admits he did not want to hurt the bird, he just wanted a tree house and soon the cubs see the bird's eggs hatch just in time.
37a	11a	"That Stump Must Go"	Bruce Robb	September 9, 2003	December 1, 2004
It was Father's Day but Brother and Sister do not have anything to give to Papa so they watch him in the yard and learns that the birds keep eating the seeds he is planting so they make him a scarecrow to scare away the birds. Meanwhile, Papa has been making the yard perfect and finds one nasty thing he does not like: an old stump that has been sitting for years. He tries to move it but it will not budge so after many attempts, he decides to turn it into an outdoor table finally making the yard perfect.
37b	11b	"Draw It"	Bruce Robb	September 9, 2003	December 1, 2004
Brother takes interest in art class to wanting to draw faces but the teacher starts some classes with basic shapes. Brother finds it boring and wants to quit, shocking Mama who suggests he goes and sees Papa, who is coaching a Little League team and needs Brother's help to give Kenny batting lessons but all Kenny wants to do is hit home runs which is just like what Brother is facing. Soon, both Brother and Kenny learn how to do their problems right and finally master it. Brother manages to draw faces right and Kenny manages to hit a home run on his first swing at bat.
38a	12a	"Papa's Pizza"	Dawn Parish	September 10, 2003	December 2, 2004
Brother and Sister plan to have friends over but since they have invited a lot, that turns into a party which Mama improves. Mama wants to know what their friends want for lunch. So, over the week, Brother and Sister ask their friends but none of them have the same interests and find their list quite complicated so Papa throws in a suggestion: making pizza for lunch instead. As a way of Papa's idea, he makes a buffet on the kitchen table and have the cubs and their friends make their very own pizza for lunch.
38b	12b	"The Female Fullback"	Pamela Slavin	September 10, 2003	December 2, 2004
Brother, Too Tall, and Cousin Fred have a football game coming up but their practicing is not getting anywhere. Soon they meet a cub named Betsy with skills in track, basketball, and ballet. They ask her for help with their football practice but she says they have to help her with her sports. Doing that, what the three did not know is that Betsy was helping them all along and even though she originally was not playing, their football moves is what they had used was also great help in her sports too.
39a	13a	"Bears for All Seasons"	Bruce Robb	September 11, 2003	December 3, 2004
The autumn season gets in a weatherall mix this year as what Brother and Sister faced. The first day, the weather turned warm like summer and the family goes to the lake for swimming. The second day, the autumn weather comes back and they make a leaf pile to jump into. The third day, the autumn weather suddenly gets hit with an unexpected early winter weather and the cubs have fun making snow angels, building a snowman, and making a snow fort with their friends. All of which are learning from Mama and Papa: "Enjoy whatever the weather will bring to you and you'll always find something fun to do." and another lesson on their previous day fun: "Don't waste today wishing the weather was like yesterday, go out and enjoy whatever today has to offer." But by the fourth day, when Mama has planned for a ski trip, their plans get canceled by a rainstorm that is melting all of the snow. As the cubs share the same lesson with Mama and Papa, they find fun activities to do inside on a rainy day and instead focus on what they will face what the next day will bring them.
39b	13b	"Grow It"	Dawn Parish	September 11, 2003	December 3, 2004
During a baseball game, Sister catches a fly ball into a thistle bush and gets covered in sticker burrs. When Mama has to cut off a large amount of Sister's fur to get the burrs out, there is one problem: her fur is too short to put her ribbon back on. Sister is not thrilled with that because no one will recognize her anymore. Every day, she tries to put on her ribbon but it just falls off and Sister has to face going to school without her ribbon. While fishing with Gramps, he shares a story with her about patience and soon, Sister learns to be patient waiting for her fur to grow back.
40a	14a	"Go Up and Down"	Peter Sauder	September 12, 2003	December 6, 2004
When Papa takes the cubs to the Bruins' cottage by the lake for a weekend trip, he gets so eager to go fishing that he forgets certain things needed for their fishing that he has to go back up to the cottage to get something, eventually eating into the usual time that the fish would bite. The cubs try to convince him to plan ahead but Papa dismisses that advice that they had plenty of time. The up and down trip wear Papa out and becomes too tired to get up early the next day so the cubs plan ahead for their fishing and manages to catch a perfect amount of fish for their dinner.
40b	14b	"Big Bear, Small Bear"	Bruce Robb	September 12, 2003	December 6, 2004
One day, Papa and Mama announced that they will not be home till after the cubs get back from school so they put their trust in Brother to get him and Sister into the treehouse by giving him a front door key. Brother likes the responsibility a lot that he decides to be like Papa and helps him with a table and painting it. Soon, Brother misses playing with his friends and while unlocking Mrs. Grizzle's front door, he uses his cub skills to get into her house. Back at home, Brother admits to Papa he did like the important jobs but he misses being himself again and Papa tells him that he should not have been in a hurry to grow up, even though that he has been given a bigger responsibility, he has helped Sister and their dog, Little Lady but another big important job is being a good pal to his friends. He decides to be a good pal to his friends and joined them in a baseball game but he claims he is always welcome to give in hand to being a grown up bear in the mix of being himself, a fun-loving cub in the Bear family as Papa tells him his tool belt will be there waiting for him when he wants to help again.
