= Tajja Isen =

Canadian actress

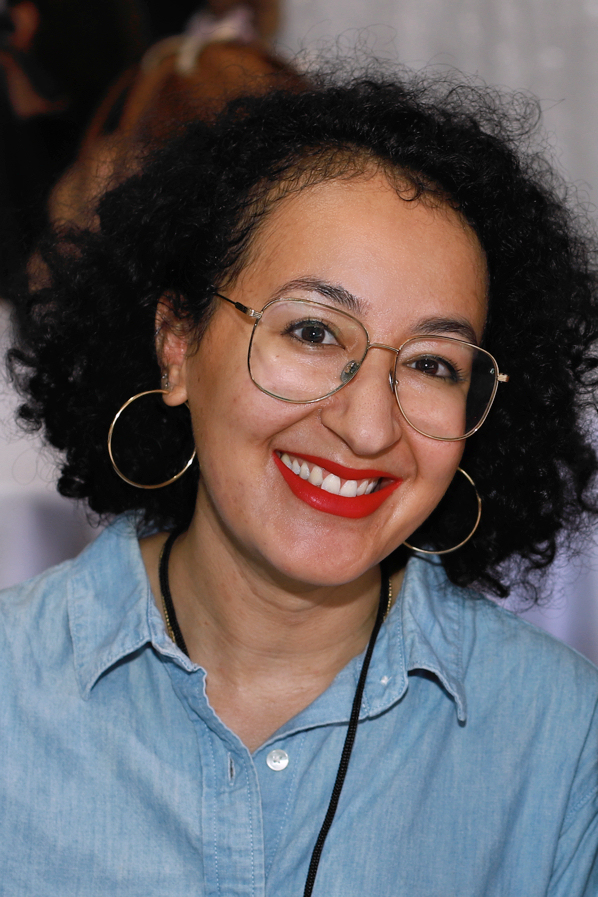
- Isen at the 2022 Texas Book Festival
- Born: June 29, 1991 (age 35); Toronto, Ontario, Canada
- Occupations: Actress; writer
- Years active: 1997–present
- Relatives: Nissae Isen (sister)

Tajja Isen (born June 29, 1991) is a Canadian actress and writer. Her first book, the essay collection Some of My Best Friends: Essays on Lip Service, was published in April 2022. As an actress, she is best known for voicing the title character Atomic Betty. She has several other voice credits, including Samantha in Franklin and the Turtle Lake Treasure, Sister Bear in the 2002 revival of The Berenstain Bears, Pipsqueak in The ZhuZhus, Princess Pea/Presto in the PBS Kids show Super Why!, Jane in Jane and the Dragon, Jodie in Time Warp Trio, Franny's singing voice in Franny's Feet, and Jazzi in The Save-Ums!.

== Early life ==
Isen was born in Toronto, the oldest of five children to Karen, who is originally from Trinidad and Tobago and Jordie Isen, who is of Eastern European heritage. Her younger sister, Nissae is also an actress.

== Career ==
At 10 years old, she began her voice acting career with Nelvana's 2002 version of The Berenstain Bears, where she voiced Sister Bear. Before that, she was a huge fan of the books and watched videos of the 1985 series. At the age of 9, she portrayed Young Nala in a Toronto stage production of Disney's The Lion King and was nominated for an Equity Emerging Artist Award for that role.

Her first book, Some of My Best Friends: Essays on Lip Service, was published in 2022 by Atria/One Signal and Doubleday Canada. She was the editor-in-chief of Catapult magazine.

== Selected filmography ==
=== Animation ===
List of voice performances in animation

Year	Title	Role	Notes
2002–03	The Berenstain Bears	Sister Bear	Main role
2002–06	The Save-Ums!	Jazzi	Main role
2003–07	JoJo's Circus	Trina Tightrope/Princess Josephina	Main role (Trina)
2004–08	Atomic Betty	Betty Barrett/Atomic Betty (title role)	79 episodes, Main role
2005–08	Franny's Feet	Lacey/Franny (singing voice)	2 episodes/singing voice in the theme song
2005–08	Miss BG	BG (singing voice)	Opening and closing songs
2005–06	Time Warp Trio	Borte/Jodie	episodes 3, 20–26, voiced by Sarah Gadon from 1–14 (earlier) Credited as Tajja Eisen.
2005–06	Jane and the Dragon	Jane (title role)	26 episodes, Main role
2005–07	Miss Spider's Sunny Patch Friends	Lil Sis	4 episodes
2006	Meteor and the Mighty Monster Trucks	Ponytail, Girl Truck	Main role (Ponytail)
2007–16	Super Why!	Princess Pea/Presto	Main role
2010–11	Pirates: Adventures in Art	Princess Cleo	Main role
2011–23	Mia and Me	Yuko	26 episodes
2011–12	My Big Big Friend	Nessa, Nina, Ashley, Track Rats	Main role (Nessa)
2016–17	The ZhuZhus	Pipsqueak, Rainbow Roo	Main role (Pipsqueak)
2017–20	Top Wing	Additional voices	
2019–21	Norman Picklestripes	Juniper	Main role
2021–23	Go, Dog. Go!	Cheddar Biscuit	Voice role

=== Live-action roles ===
Year	Title	Role	Notes
2002	Doc	Mindy	Episode: "Complicated"
2009–10	The Latest Buzz	Zuzu Moon	3 episodes

=== Movies ===
Year	Title	Role	Notes
2005	Heidi	Heidi	Voice
2006	Franklin and the Turtle Lake Treasure	Samantha, Young Granny	Voice

== Awards ==
- 2004 – Young Artist Awards- Best Performance in a Voice-Over Role – Nominated (Berenstain Bears)
- 2007 – Young Artist Awards- Best Performance in a Voice-Over Role – Won (Jane and the Dragon)
- 2009 – Gemini Awards- Best Individual or Ensemble Performance in an Animated Television Show or Series – Won (Atomic Betty)
