= Nissae Isen =

Canadian actress (born 1997)

- Born: March 3, 1997 (age 29); Toronto, Ontario, Canada
- Occupation: Actress
- Years active: 2005–present
- Relatives: Tajja Isen (sister)

Nissae Isen (born March 3, 1997) is a Canadian actress who has voiced prominent young male characters in several television series, including BG's younger brother George in Miss BG from 2005 to 2008, Yuri in My Big Big Friend from 2008 to 2014 (for which she received a 2012 nomination for "Best Performance in a Voice-Over Role" in the 33rd Young Artist Awards for her work in 2011 episodes), Beatrice in Franklin and Friends from 2011 to 2013, and the Canadian-accented voice of Trollee (the UK-accented was done by Samantha Reynolds) as one of the principal cast members of Mike the Knight, — for which she received a "Best Performance in a Voice-Over Role" nomination in the 34th Young Artist Awards in 2013 for her work on 2012 episodes.

She has also voiced less prominent female characters, including Juanita, the Galactic Guardian younger sister of Paloma in Season 2 of Atomic Betty in 2006, Ivy in Miss Spider's Sunny Patch Friends in 2007, Will's younger sister Kate in Will and Dewitt from 2007 to 2008 and Jade Gibble in My Friend Rabbit from 2007 to 2008. She voiced the adult version of D.W. Read in the Arthur series finale "All Grown Up" (2022).

Minor male characters that she has voiced include a little penguin from Harry and His Bucket Full of Dinosaurs and Thor Powell in at least one 2006 episode of Captain Flamingo.

== Early life ==
Isen was born in Toronto, the third of five children to Karen, who is originally from Trinidad and Tobago and Jordie Isen. She is the younger sister of actress, singer, and author Tajja.
