= Duronto =

Duronto may refer to:

- Duronto TV, a Bangladeshi television channel for children
- Duronto Express, an Indian Railways train service
- Duronto Rajshahi, a Bangladeshi cricket team
