= PINY: Institute of New York =

- Also known as: PINY: Pinypon Institute of New York
- Genre: Comedy
- Created by: Victor M. Lopez; Rubén Zarauza
- Directed by: SalBa Combé; Javi Peces
- Composers: Guille Milkyway; Paul Bevoir
- Country of origin: Spain
- Original language: English
- No. of seasons: 1
- No. of episodes: 52

Production
- Executive producers: Victor M. Lopez; Rubén Zarauza; Marie-Eve Rougeot; Ángel Molinero
- Editors: Vahum Galeote; Gorka Vázquez
- Running time: 11 minutes
- Production companies: Famosa Animation; Ánima Kitchent

Original release
- Network: Disney Channel (Spain)
- Release: September 18, 2016 – July 25, 2020

PINY: Institute of New York (also known as PINY: Pinypon Institute of New York) is an English-language Spanish animated television series that premiered on Disney Channel in Spain on September 18, 2016. The series is created by Victor M. Lopez and Rubén Zarauza, and is based on the Pinypon toy franchise.

The series is about Michelle Fairchild, a student at the titular prestigious college in a bid to become a top fashion designer. She befriends the Indie Girls; Lilith and Tasha, as the trio have adventures in PINY.

== Plot ==
PINY: Institute of New York follows Michelle Fairchild, a humble 14-year-old designer who is interested in fashion and dreams of making it big in the "fashion world." One day she gets offered an interview from PINY for a fully funded position in their class. After making a rocky first impression on the headmistress, Madame Forbes, she still gets accepted in PINY. Once she gets there, she meets her roommates Tasha Robinson, a faithful self-confident singer, and Lilith Henderson, an elegant and charming scientist, who she eventually becomes friends with as they form the Indie Girls team. However, Michelle is also placed one room across from the room of Julia Cooper, the spoiled leader of the Beautiful People, and Dory and Rita, her loyal assistants. Julia plans on eliminating and humiliating Michelle and the Indie Girls.

== Characters ==
The Indie Girls and Beautiful People, from left to right: Michelle, Lilith, Tasha, Rita, Julia, Dory.

=== Main characters ===
==== Michelle Fairchild ====
Michelle is a kind, impulsive, and creative 14-year-old designer, and the new girl at PINY. She is a part of the Indie Girls team. Michelle is a girl of humble origins and possesses a great talent for design and fashion. She has always dreamed of being able to create her own brand of clothing and now she has become a PINY student. She is quite friendly and speaks for her human rights. Michelle Fairchild has two roommates, Tasha and Lilith, who are also her best friends in the school. They hang out together and support each other. Michelle points out where she has gone wrong. An example is shown in episode 20, "Hire Me". Michelle was part of a TV show hosted by Annie Summers, but she finally realized having the job was a big mistake as in Secret Non-Admirer she publishes a picture of Julia and did not own up to it because she was scared of losing her scholarship. Michelle also has a huge crush on Will, but then later Sam. Michelle is sweet and determined. She will stop at nothing once she has her mind set on something. She can be stubborn at times, though. For example, in episode 26, "Who is Michelle", she is mean to her best friends because the fact that she is adopted makes her not feel like herself anymore. But at the end of the episode, she manages to apologize to her friends. She is a very sweet person in the long run. She is also quite clumsy, especially around Julia.

==== Tasha ====
Tasha is a student with moderate vermilion hair and luminous vivid amber eyes.

Like the rest of the female main characters, Tasha is usually seen wearing two different outfits in the series.

Her most common outfit would be a luminous vivid amber dress with black and luminous vivid amber striped skirt underneath a green and white jacket. She wears very pale amber leggings. On her feet is a pair of luminous vivid amber mid-heel boots with deep amber heels, quarter, and laces. Her hair would be styled into an afro with bangs. On her head, she would wear a vivid spring green and pale, light grayish spring green colors headband with a pale amber wing decoration at each ends.

Her second outfit would be a light brilliant amber jacket underneath a pale amber blouse. She wears a moderate sea green skirt with white stripes and a dark amber belt. On her feet would be a pair of brilliant amber mid-heel boots with dark amber heels, welt, and laces, white toe cap, and moderate spring green tongue. The boots have a green with black and luminous vivid amber in the inside star on each sides. Her hair would be styled into dreadlocks with bangs. On her head, she would also wears the same vivid spring green and pale, light grayish spring green colors headband but with the star decoration at each ends instead of wings.

=== Recurring ===
- Madame Rania Forbes is the strict headmistress of PINY.
- Sam Ryan is Will's best friend. He has a crush on Michelle.
- Stella Marie is a Western cowgirl who the Indie Girls befriend in the episode "Locked In".
- James Fairchild is Michelle's father. His wife died when Michelle was little.
- Mr. Grasso is the Professor at PINY.
- Austin Zimmer is Lilith's cousin and a famous singer.

== Episodes ==
No.	Title	Written by	Storyboard by	Original release date	U.K. air date
1	"First Impressions"	Eric Shaw	Javi Peces	September 18, 2016	4 September 2017
Michelle has an interview that could help her enter the PINY institute along with the best young talents of the city, but first she must impress a peculiar director.
2	"Second Impressions"	Sean Gabuat	Javi Peces	September 18, 2016	4 September 2017
Michelle faces her first day in PINY. She meets her new friends but also encounters a rival who keeps watching her.
3	"The Secret"	George Beckerman	Javi Peces	September 18, 2016	5 September 2017
Being a fish out of water in high school is not easy, so Michelle has decided to hide the fact that her father works at the institute.
4	"Fashion Backwards"	Jayne Hamil	Raúl Arnáiz	September 18, 2016	5 September 2017
If your designs keep being stolen, it's normal to feel frustrated. But Michelle has found a way to stop that from happening.
5	"To Tutor or Not to Tutor"	Story by : George Beckerman; Written by : George Beckerman and Jayne Hamil	Javi Peces	September 25, 2016	6 September 2017
Julia is so upset when she gets a spot on her forehead that her academic performance suffers, and the only person who can help is Michelle, her arch enemy.
6	"Fad In"	Dave Matos and Mikey Newman	Manuel Borras	September 25, 2016	6 September 2017
Michelle is involved in a lie about her Holopet, a new virtual pet that has either revolutionized PINY students or zombified them.
7	"Best Blogged"	Kenyon McFarlane	Raúl Arnáilz	September 25, 2016	7 September 2017
Becoming the best dressed girl PINY is an honor for Michelle, although the joy doesn't last long because Julia declares war.
8	"Cosmania"	Story by : Lara Everly, Javi Peces and SalBa Combé; Written by : Lara Everly	Kenny Ruiz	September 25, 2016	7 September 2017
Julia demands to star in the PINY musical, but an injury at the last minute gives Michelle a chance to act opposite Will instead.
9	"Makeover Nightmare"	Kimmy Gatewood	Raúl Arnáilz	October 2, 2016	8 September 2017
Teamwork might make you strong, but when it comes to Michelle and Julia, it's their worst nightmare.
10	"Curse of the Bridge"	Story by : Sean Gabuat; Written by : Jayne Hamil	Javier Ara	October 2, 2016	8 September 2017
Michelle doesn't believe in curses, but a crossing of the Encantado bridge might change her mind.
11	"Horsing Around"	Story by : Jess Gattuso, Sean Gabuat, SalBa Combé and Javi Peces; Written by : Sean Gabuat	Javi Peces	October 2, 2016	11 September 2017
This year's Animals Week is dedicated to horses, which Julia doesn't like. Michelle however loves them. Who will end up being on the cover of Fashion Pet?
12	"American Mydol"	Story by : Sean Gabuat; Written by : George Beckerman	Kenny Ruiz	October 2, 2016	11 September 2017
Zimmer Austin is the pop star of the moment. Fortunately for the students, his next concert will be at the institute - and will come with many surprises.
13	"Secret Non-Admirer"	Jess Gattuso	Manuel Borras	October 9, 2016	12 September 2017
Michelle mistakenly publishes a retouched photo of Julia on the PINY blog and now she has to fix it.
14	"Piny Runway"	Sean Gabuat	Manuel Borras	October 9, 2016	12 September 2017
Michelle must design some clothes based on her parents' jobs, but what's glamorous about a janitor's uniform? And what about her mother?
15	"Dribble Trouble"	Evan Gore and Heather Lombard	Javier Ara	October 9, 2016	13 September 2017
Michelle has lost inspiration and discovers that playing sports helps her. She may well have uncovered a new talent.
16	"Labyrinth"	Sean Gabuat	Javier Ara	October 9, 2016	13 September 2017
After getting locked in a classroom, Michelle and Sam use the secret PINY passages to make sure they get to the fashion show on time.
17	"Stupid Cupid"	Sean Gabuat	Javier Ara	October 16, 2016	14 September 2017
Lilith is determined to prove that love is based on science, but it might not be such a good idea to test the theory on her friends.
18	"Bella Lima"	Story by : Sean Gabuat and Lana Everly; Written by : Sean Gabuat	Javier Ara	October 16, 2016	14 September 2017
Bella Lima will assist PINY to present a new line of designs. But what is your source of inspiration? Maybe Michelle and Julia have something to say about it.
19	"Cooking Disaster"	Sean Gabuat	Manuel Borras and Maca Gil	October 16, 2016	15 September 2017
Culinary arts week has begun at PINY and Michelle wants to show her skills in the kitchen, but she might not be as good as she thinks she is.
20	"Lonely at the Top"	Story by : Sean Gabuat and Jayne Hamil; Written by : Jayne Hamil	Javier Ara	October 16, 2016	15 September 2017
Tasha has got the chance of a lifetime: to become a pop star. But fame can sometimes take you away from what you want most.
21	"Lilith Had a Little Hen"	Sean Gabuat	Kenny Ruiz	October 23, 2016	18 September 2017
Lillith's invention has aroused the interest of Dr Forbes and he invites her to present at the Annual Technology Fair. Can she overcome her stage fright?
22	"Locked In"	Story by : Kenyon McFarlane and Sean Gabuat; Written by : Sean Gabuat	Manuel Borras and Maca Gil	October 23, 2016	18 September 2017
Michelle has ended up at the 'lock down' party where the institute's weirdos go. Will she escape and join her friends?
23	"Hire Me"	Sean Gabuat	Javier Ara	October 23, 2016	19 September 2017
Annie Summers, the most feared NY fashion critic, has discovered Michelle's talents and wants to hire her. But first she must pass a televised interview.
24	"Fire Me"	Sean Gabuat	Javier Ara	October 23, 2016	19 September 2017
Madame Forbes has stopped access to the PINY sports hall while it's being refurbished. Julia tries to take advantage of the situation to play a trick on Michelle.
25	"Baby Pictures"	Evan Gore and Heather Lombard	Manuel Borras and Maca Gil	October 30, 2016	20 September 2017
The PINY Herald will be publishing a baby picture of each of the students, but why is it so difficult for Michelle to find a picture from her childhood?
26	"Who is Michelle"	Evan Gore and Heather Lombard	Manuel Borras and Maca Gil	October 30, 2016	20 September 2017
Some unexpected news leaves Michelle confused. She doesn't react in the best way and her friends do their best to pacify her.
27	"Father's Day"	Story by : Sean Gabuat; Written by : Sean Gabuat, Evan Gore and Heather Lombard	Javier Ara	October 30, 2016	21 September 2017
Michelle is caught between a rock and a hard place. Father's Day or Friendship Day? Or maybe both?
28	"Golden Ticket"	Evan Gore and Heather Lombard	Javier Ara	October 30, 2016	21 September 2017
A competition is about to begin at PINY and a few lucky students are set to win a special prize.
29	"The Auction"	Evan Gore and Heather Lombard	Javier Ara	November 6, 2016	22 September 2017
The Indie Girls and the Beautiful People each have to design a dress which will be sold off in an auction.
30	"Crime of Fashion"	Evan Gore and Heather Lombard	Javier Ara	November 6, 2016	22 September 2017
The Indie Girls are accused of copying their design. Where did their inspiration come from?
31	"Once Upon a Time"	Story by : Sean Gabuat; Written by : Dave Lewman	Manuel Borras and Maca Gil	November 6, 2016	25 September 2017
Mr. Grasso has a great way to boost creativity - making up a story together.
32	"Coolest Girl in the World"	Story by : Evan Gore and Heather Lobmard; Written by : Penelope Lombard and Sean Gabuat	Manuel Borras and Maca Gil	November 6, 2016	25 September 2017
Busy Lizzie the blogger wants her fans to compete for the title of Coolest Girl in the World. Julia - who else? - wants to win.
33	"Catwalk on Water"	Sean Gabuat	Floriano Gerardi	November 15, 2016	26 September 2017
Michelle and Julia are selected to participate in the biggest fashion event held at PINY.
34	"Animal Attraction"	Story by : Evan Gore and Heather Lombard; Written by : Dave Lewman	Carlos Pérez	November 15, 2016	26 September 2017
The Indie Girls have noticed that Armando's been acting strange. What's going on in his head?
35	"Sam Side Story"	Sean Gabuat	Francisco Muñoz	November 15, 2016	27 September 2017
Tri-Hop, the triplets who are tearing up the world of breakdance, are recording their next video at PINY, but not everything goes to plan.
36	"Downhill Side"	Story by : Evan Gore and Heather Lombard; Written by : Dave Lewman	Floriano Gerardi	November 15, 2016	27 September 2017
During a snow trip, Michelle starts to feel jealous of the new friendship that seems to be blossoming between Julia and Tasha.
37	"Plus-One"	Evan Gore and Heather Lombard	Floriano Gerardi	November 19, 2016	28 September 2017
Tasha is determined to get Michelle to admit she's in love with Will. Michelle wants to show that Tasha is wrong.
38	"The Fake Date"	Story by : Evan Gore and Heather Lombard; Written by : Penelope Lombard	Javier Ara	November 19, 2016	28 September 2017
Tasha decides to teach Michelle how to act on a date with the boy she likes.
39	"Julia's Best Day"	Evan Gore and Heather Lombard	Paolo Gattuso	November 19, 2016	29 September 2017
In a written assignment for Mr. Grasso, Julia wants to prove that hers is 'the best day in the world'. Is Julia's day as perfect as she says?
40	"Wardrobe Malfunction"	Carina Schulze	Carlos Pérez	November 19, 2016	29 September 2017
Pop star Krystal Sparkles asks Michelle and Julia to design a dress for her next concert.
41	"The Cover Up"	Story by : Evan Gore and Heather Lombard; Written by : Dave Lewman	Paolo Gattuso	November 27, 2016	2 October 2017
Michelle and Julia face each other in a sporting competition at PINY. Will they be able to play fair?
42	"Skater Boy"	Story by : Evan Gore and Heather Lombard; Written by : Sean Gabuat and Penelope Lombard	Floriano Gerardi	November 27, 2016	2 October 2017
After an accident involving Madame Forbes' dog, the principal bans the use of skateboards in the school.
43	"No Fun Anymore"	Story by : Evan Gore and Heather Lombard; Written by : Dave Lewman	Paolo Gattuso	November 27, 2016	3 October 2017
Rita feels that Julia is no longer the bad girl she once was and is ready to do whatever it takes to get the old Julia back.
44	"Cold Facts"	Evan Gore and Heather Lombard	Floriano Gerardi	November 27, 2016	3 October 2017
Madame Forbes has prepared a snow trip as a trust-building exercise for the PINY students.
45	"Julia Quits"	Evan Gore and Heather Lombard	Javier Ara	December 4, 2016	4 October 2017
Given recent developments, Julia believes that now might be the right time for a change of scenery.
46	"Mr. and Mrs. Cooper"	Sean Gabuat	Javier Ara	December 4, 2016	4 October 2017
Michelle suspects that the Cooper family is up to something that will affect her and her father.
47	"Looking for Dory"	Sean Gabuat	Francisco Muñoz	December 4, 2016	5 October 2017
Michelle and Julia wake up in the same room and don't remember what happened the day before - nor do they know where Dory is.
48	"Rita Wears Nada"	Story by : Sean Gabuat; Written by : Sean Gabuat, Evan Gore and Heather Lombard	Maca Gil	December 11, 2016	5 October 2017
Busy Lizzie comes to PINY looking for a star for her first web-movie. This is the perfect opportunity for Julia to become a movie star.
49	"Surprise Party"	Story by : Evan Gore and Heather Lombard; Written by : Leyre Medrano, Evan Gore and Heather Lombard	Javier Ara	December 11, 2016	6 October 2017
Michelle is confused when her friends start to act strange. She begins to wonder if they're avoiding her because of her new relationship with Julia.
50	"Everybody Hates Me"	Sean Gabuat	Javier Ara	December 11, 2016	6 October 2017
Julia needs Lilith's help to make the best project for the annual science fair, but why is everyone against her?
51	"Fashion Fake"	Story by : Evan Gore and Heather Lombard; Written by : Evan Gore, Heather Lombard, Sean Gabuat and Leyre Medrano	Javier Ara	December 11, 2016	9 October 2017
Julia is working for Winfield, a very prestigious fashion designer, and everything seems perfect in her new life.
52	"Coffee Girl"	Story by : Evan Gore and Heather Lombard; Written by : Evan Gore, Heather Lombard, Sean Gabuat and Leyre Medrano	Javier Ara	July 25, 2020	9 October 2017
Julia's in trouble. Michelle has discovered her lies. It's a great opportunity to take revenge and set things straight between them.

== Broadcast ==
PINY: Institute of New York premiered on Disney Channel in Spain on 18 September 2016. The series also premiered on Pop in the United Kingdom and Ireland on 4 September 2017. The series premiered in Bangladesh on Duronto TV on 26 January 2025.
