= Top Wing =

Canadian animated series

- Genre: Children's adventure Comedy
- Created by: Matthew Fernandes
- Developed by: Scott Kraft
- Directed by: Bill Speers
- Voices of: Tristan Mercado; Jonah Wineberg; Lilly Bartlam; Abigail Oliver; Lucas Kalechstein; Ethan Pugiotto; Kingsley Marshal; Colin Doyle; Bryn McAuley; Raven Dauda; Scott Law; Joseph Motiki; Cory Doran; Stacey DePass; Tal Bachman; Julie Sype; Christian Distefano; Lacey-Lee Evin; Mili Patel; Tyler Barish; Freddie Howson
- Composers: Steve D'Angelo; Terry Tompkins; Lorenzo Castelli; Craig McConnell; Justin Forsley
- Country of origin: Canada
- Original language: English
- No. of seasons: 2
- No. of episodes: 52 (list of episodes)

Production
- Executive producers: Vince Commisso; Matthew Fernandes; Arthur Spanos; Scott Kraft
- Producer: Vanessa Wong
- Running time: 22 minutes
- Production companies: Industrial Brothers; 9 Story Media Group (Note: As TW 1 Productions Inc. (season 1) and TW 2 Productions Inc. (season 2)); Nickelodeon Productions

Original release
- Network: Nickelodeon (United States); Treehouse TV (Canada)
- Release: November 6, 2017 – July 2, 2020

Top Wing is a Canadian animated television series created by Matthew Fernandes of Industrial Brothers. It was produced in-house by Industrial Brothers in partnership with 9 Story Media Group for Nickelodeon. In Canada, the series debuted on Treehouse on January 6, 2018. Nickelodeon acquired the worldwide broadcast, distribution and merchandise rights to the show outside of Canada and serves as its commissioner, and it premiered on Nickelodeon in the United States on November 6, 2017. In the UK, the main cast's voices are dubbed with British voice actors, replacing their original Canadian voices.

On May 22, 2018, it was announced that the series had been renewed for a second season, which premiered on March 1, 2019. Since May 31, 2019, new episodes moved to the Nick Jr. Channel in the United States.

The series has a page on the Paramount+ website, but no episodes have been added as of November 2026.

== Premise ==
Taking place on Big Swirl Island, an island inhabited by birds and other animals, Top Wing follows four eager young birds—Swift, Brody, Penny, and Rod—who work together at Top Wing Academy as new cadets to earn their wings by helping their community. With the help of their mentor Speedy, the cadets take on different missions for their rescue skills and also help those in need, all while learning important lessons.

== Characters ==
=== Main ===
- Swift (voiced by Jonah Wineberg in Season 1 and Tristan Mercado in Season 2) is a blue jay, who is the leader of Team Top Wing and really great at flying high up in the sky. His signature color is orange, and his vehicles are the Flash Wing jet and the Zip Flash jet-copter.
- Rod (voiced by Ethan Pugiotto) is a rooster who's ready to drive around the island with his all-terrain vehicle. He's also the comic relief cadet. His signature color is red, and his vehicles are the Road Wing roadster and the Rooster Booster motorcycle.
- Brody (voiced by Lucas Kalechstein in the US, and Leni Hamilton in the UK) is a puffin who loves to fly with the waves, over and on. His signature color is green, and his vehicles are the Splash Wing boat and the Splash Diver boat and submarine hybrid.
- Penny (voiced by Abigail Oliver) is a penguin who is an expert at undersea life in her submarine and the only female cadet. Her signature color is pink, and her vehicles are the Aqua Wing submarine and the Aqua Runner submarine.
- Speedy (voiced by Colin Doyle) helps out the Top Wing cadets. He is their ace instructor. He pilots the HQ Command Flyer.
- Bea (voiced by Bryn McAuley) is the female chief mechanic who helps out at HQ with Speedy.
- Chirp and Cheep are two baby chicks who are seen with the Top Wing cadets. Chirp has two pink feathers on her head, while Cheep has two blue feathers on his head. They can only say their own names.

=== Recurring ===
- Rhonda (voiced by Raven Dauda) is a rhinoceros who is the owner of The Lemon Shack.
- Oscar (voiced by Joseph Motiki) is a blue octopus.
- Farmer Treegoat (voiced by Jonathan Potts) is a tree goat.
- Sammy Monkey (voiced by Tyler Barish) is a little monkey.
- Shirley Squirrley (voiced by Bryn McAuley) is a squirrel who enjoys flying, thus she dons wings like those on a flying squirrel.
- Timmy Turtle (voiced by Meesha Contreras) is a young turtle who's Honu's son and he's the leader of the Junior Cadets.
- Honu Turtle (voiced by Linda Ballantyne) is Timmy's mom and works as a conductor for the Turtle Train.
- Dina (voiced by TJ McGibbon in the US) is a young rhinoceros.
- Ms. Brownbear (voiced by Julie Sype) is the student's teacher.
- Commodore Herky J. Smurkturkski III (voiced by Scott Law) is an announcer turkey
- The Turkskis (voiced by Scott Law) are Commodore Smurkturkski's three little chicks
- Tina Treegoat (voiced by Lacey-Lee Evin) is a young tree goat who's Grady's daughter and one of the Junior Cadets.
- Grady Treegoat (voiced by Cory Doran) is Tina's dad
- Ward Beaver (voiced by Tal Bachman) is Wally's dad
- June Beaver (voiced by Stacey DePass) is Wally's mom
- Wally Beaver (voiced by Tyler Barish) is a young beaver who's June and Ward's son and he's one of the Junior Cadets
- Anyu PolarBear (voiced by Piper Hook) is a young polar bear who befriends with Penny and she's one of the Junior Cadets
- Yuka PolarBear (voiced by Jayden Greig) is Anyu's brother
- Mr. PolarBear (voiced by Joanathan Potts) is Anyu and Yuka's dad
- Salty Seawalrus (voiced by TBD) is Penny's walrus friend
- T (voiced by Lyon Smith) is a turtle, who is a surfer and Brody's friend.
- Shelley (voiced by Julie Sype in Season 1 and Alexa Torrington in Season 2) is a turtle, who is a surfer and Brody's friend.
- Reg Goosling (voiced by TBD) is Ryan's dad
- Ryan Goosling (voiced by Christian Distefano) is Reg and Mama Goosling's son
- Mama Goosling (voiced by TBD) is Ryan's mom
- Earl the Gadget Squirrel (voiced by Benjamin Kowalewicz) is an inventor

=== Minor ===
- Captain Gander (voiced by Scott Law)
- Mama Bear (voiced by Josie Cotton) is Bertha's mom
- Papa Bear (voiced by Mark Oliver Everett) is Bertha's dad
- Bertha Bear (voiced by Nissae Isen) is a little bear cub
- Chickster, Chuckster, Chitter, Chatter, Clucky and Bob are Chirp and Cheep's cousins
- Snow Geese
- Brenda (voiced by Zoe Hatz) is Brody's little sister
- Bill (voiced by TBD) is Brody's dad
- Beth (voiced by TBD) is Brody's mom
- Sandy Stork (voiced by Alanis Morissette) is a stork who rides on her plane
- Ma (voiced by Holly McNarland) is Rod's mom
- Pa (voiced by TBD) is Rod's dad
- Romeo (voiced by Jaiden Cannatelli) is Rod's little brother
- Rudy, Ronald, Ruben, Rachel, Rebecca and Ruslana are Rod's little brothers and sisters
- Survivor Bear (voiced by Terry McGurrin) is Big Swirl Island's TV Star with a Les Stroud-type of personality.
- Inspector Eagle-Eye (voiced by TBD) is the Inspector who trains the Cadets at the Cadet Challenge as they pass
- Roland the Rhino (voiced by Devin Mack) is a doorman who keeps the Cadets away
- Tya, Teddy, Toots, Tomba, and Tippy Top are Tina's five cousins
- Niko (voiced by Christian Campbell) is Rhonda's nephew
- Rosie (voiced by Shechinah Mpulmwana) is Rhonda's cousin
- CJay (voiced by Ian Thornley) is Swift's grandpa
- David "Davey" Hasselhawg (voiced by Jamie Watson) is a lifeguard of Big Swirl Beach
- Mrs. Penguin (voiced by TBD) is Penny's mom
- Patrick (voiced by TBD) is Penny's dad
- Petey (voiced by Wyatt White) is Penny's little brother who's introduced in season 2.
- Phoebe, Precious, Phoenix, Portia, Presley and Pascal are Penny's little brothers and sisters
- Santa Claus (voiced by TBD) is a polar bear
- Trini Treegoat
- Finn (voiced by Nicholas Fry) is Brenda's best friend
- The Dodos (voiced by Deryck Whibley, TBD, TBD and Darryl Palumbo)
- Della Dodo (voiced by Molly Lewis) is a young dodo
- Meggy, Greggy, Suzette, and Egguardo Dodo are Della's little brothers and sisters

=== Antagonists ===
- Captain Dilly (voiced by Cory Doran) is a pirate alligator
- Matilda (voiced by Annick Obonsawin) is Captain Dilly's pirate mate
- Baddy McBat (voiced by Cory Doran) is a male bat who flies on his jet and Betty's brother.
- Betty McBat (voiced by Stacey DePass) is a female bat who drives on her bike and Baddy's sister.
- Rocco (voiced by Taylor Abrahamse) is an alligator who rides on his boat
- Chomps (voiced by Christian Martyn) is a crocodile who dives on his sub
- Banana Bandits (voiced by TBD, Adam Gontier and TBD) are three monkey bandits
- Margo the Monkey (voiced by Julie Lemieux) is a female monkey
- Captain Swabby is Captain Dilly's aunt

== Episodes ==
Season	Segments	Episodes	Originally released	
Season	Segments	Episodes	First released	Last released
Pilot			October 9, 2015	
1	51	26	November 6, 2017	December 21, 2018
2	48	26	March 1, 2019	July 2, 2020

== Broadcast ==
Top Wing debuted on Nickelodeon internationally in early 2018, outside of Canada.

=== Dubs ===
Top Wing has been translated into French, and this version airs in Canada on Telequebec. The French-language version of the show is available online as part of Telequebec's free streaming service for children's programming called CouCou TV. The characters' names do not change in French, and the school is referred to as Academie Top Wing. The Bangla version was shown on Duronto TV in Bangladesh on 2020–2021.

== Merchandising ==
=== DVD ===
Nickelodeon, and Paramount Home Entertainment released a DVD of the show on March 5, 2019. In France, TF1 Video will publish the series soon on DVD.

== Awards and nominations ==
Year	Award	Category	Nominee	Result	Ref.
2018	Young Artist Awards	Best Performance in a Voice Acting Role — Young Artist	Lucas Kalechstein	Nominated	
2018	YoungStar Awards	Best Ensemble Cast — Voiceover Role	Lucas Kalechstein, Ethan Pugiotto, Abigail Oliver, Jonah Wineburg	Won	
