= Radio Today =

Bangladeshi radio station

Coordinates: 23.7938°N 90.4050°E

Radio Today FM 89.6

Dhaka, Bangladesh; Bangladesh
- Broadcast area: Bangladesh (FM)
- Frequency: 89.6 FM
- Branding: Radio Today FM 89.6

Programming
- Language: Bengali
- Format: Music, News and Infotainment Radio

Ownership
- Owner: Radio Broadcasting FM (Bangladesh) Co. Ltd / Md. Rafiqul Haque

History
- First air date: May 2006

Links
- Webcast: https://radiotodaydhaka.com
- Website: https://radiotodaydhaka.com

Radio Today is a 24 hours radio station in Bangladesh that started airing in May 2006. It is currently available in Dhaka, Chittagong, Cox's Bazar, Khulna, Bogra, Sylhet, Mymensingh, Barishal, Kushtia, Comilla.

== History ==
Radio Today started as Bangladesh's first private FM radio station in May 2006, in Dhaka at 89.6 MHz. It received permission from the government in 2002 and started with a 45 million BDT investment. The founding chief executive officer and managing director was Md Rafiqul Haque. Saiful Amin was the editor of Radio Today. On 27 May 2009, Radio Today received government approval to expand to six cities in Bangladesh outside of Dhaka. It is available in Bogra, Chittagong, Cox's Bazar, Khulna, and Sylhet.

Radio Today is located in FR Tower in Banani which caught fire on 28 March 2019 stopping the transmission Radio Today. The tower also housed Duronto TV which also stopped its transmission.

In August 2011, a reporter of Radio Today was assaulted by activists of Jagannath University unit of the Bangladesh Chhatra League, a student wing of the governing Awami League, close to the Jatiya Press Club.

== Programs ==
Radio Today plays popular Bangladeshi music, classic music, and Hindi songs. Music is featured in programs such as Today's Classic, Morning Crush, School of Rock, Afternoon Cafe, Minner Live, OMG, FM Mama, Movie Madness, HOT FM, Radio Gaan Buzz, The Mastermind Show by Kazi Nipu. The Salman show by Salman Mohammad Abdullah.

== News ==
Everyday News, airs five times a day giving news updates with Dhakar Chaka giving live traffic updates in between other shows. Morning News, Evening News and other news are also podcast on website on a daily basis. In 2007, it was the only private station to broadcast their own news program. In 2008, it started a joint news program with Voice of America.

Radio Today launched Green Radio program hosted by SK Richard to build up awareness on Global Warming in January 2010. This 'Green News' segment is now podcasting on news section in the Radio Today website.
