= List of Top Wing episodes =

Top Wing is a Canadian animated television series created by Matthew Fernandes of Industrial Brothers and produced by Industrial Brothers and 9 Story Media Group. It premiered on Nickelodeon in the United States on November 6, 2017, and debuted on Treehouse in Canada on January 6, 2018.

The following is a list of episodes from the series Top Wing.

== Series overview ==
Season	Segments	Episodes	Originally released	
Season	Segments	Episodes	First released	Last released
Pilot			October 9, 2015	
1	51	26	November 6, 2017	December 21, 2018
2	48	26	March 1, 2019	July 2, 2020

== Episodes ==
=== Season 1 (2017–18) ===
No. overall	No. in season	Title	Directed by	Written by	Original air date (U.S.)	Original air date (Canada)	Prod. code	U.S. viewers (millions)
1	1	"Time to Earn Our Wings"	Bill Speers	Scott Kraft	November 6, 2017 (Note: This episode was released early on the Nick Jr. website on October 7, 2017, prior to its air date.)	January 5, 2018	101	0.90
A team of birds, consisting of Swift, Penny, Brody, and Rod, must earn their wings by training at Top Wing Academy. Note: This is the first double-length episode.
2a	2a	"Rod Cock-a-doodle Didn't"	Bill Speers	Scott Albert	November 7, 2017	January 12, 2018	105	0.84
Swift must come to the rescue when Rod's loud singing gets him trapped in an avalanche.
2b	2b	"Goose on the Loose"	Bill Speers	Anita Kapila	November 7, 2017	January 12, 2018	105	0.84
Swift and Brody are forced to pair up in order to lead geese to safety.
3a	3a	"Lemon Pirates"	Bill Speers	Scott Albert	November 10, 2017	January 19, 2018	104	1.02
When Captain Dilly and Matilda take the island's lemons, the cadets must bring the lemons back to the Lemon Shack.
3b	3b	"Treasure Map Mission"	Bill Speers	Brian Hartigan	November 10, 2017	January 19, 2018	104	1.02
While earning her Map Reading Badge, Penny finds Captain Dilly and Matilda and must rescue the rest of the Top Wing Team.
4a	4a	"Rod's Beary Brave Save"	Bill Speers	Brian Hartigan	November 13, 2017	January 26, 2018	102	0.79
Rod proves that he is a rooster (and not a chicken) as he finds a cub named Baby Bear lost in the Haunted Cave.
4b	4b	"Race Through Danger Canyon"	Bill Speers	Scott Albert	November 13, 2017	January 26, 2018	102	0.79
A jet-flying bat roars into Danger Canyon to show off his prowess.
5a	5a	"Lunch Box Rescue"	Bill Speers	Aaron Barnett	November 16, 2017	February 2, 2018	106	0.71
The cadets help Timmy Turtle when he drops his new lunch box in the river.
5b	5b	"Winging It"	Bill Speers	Nicole Demerse	November 16, 2017	February 2. 2018	106	0.71
The cadets race for a trophy.
6a	6a	"Penny's Polar Bear Rescue"	Bill Speers	Nicole Demerse	December 15, 2017	2018	103	0.98
Penny saves the day when a stranded polar-bear family floats into the warm water near Big Swirl Island.
6b	6b	"Shirley Squirrely Flies Away"	Bill Speers	Nicole Demerse and Anita Kapila	December 15, 2017	2018	103	0.98
Team Top Wing saves Shirley Squirrely when her giant flying machine nearly crashes into the ocean.
7a	7a	"The Great Flash Wing Rescue"	Bill Speers	Brian Hartigan	January 2, 2018	2018	107	1.03
The Cadets rescue Cheep, Chirp and Swift's Flash-Wing when Baddy McBat takes the jet with the chicks inside it.
7b	7b	"Turtle Train Rescue"	Bill Speers	Aaron Barnett	January 2, 2018	2018	107	1.03
Falling rocks derail the Turtle Train; Meanwhile, Swift must learn to pilot Penny's sub.
8a	8a	"Chicks on the Loose"	Bill Speers	Scott Albert	January 4, 2018	2018	109	0.82
Cheep and Chirp's little cousins speed off in the Cadets' vehicles.
8b	8b	"Rod's Dream of Flying"	Bill Speers	James Backshall and Jeff Sweeney	January 4, 2018	2018	109	0.82
Baddy falls out of his jet while giving Rod a ride.
9a	9a	"Penny's Deep Sea Dive"	Bill Speers	Anita Kapila	January 15, 2018	2018	108	1.37
Penny's friend Salty asks Team Top Wing for help after Penny becomes trapped rescuing his old boat. Special Guest Star: Matthew Sweet as Salty Seawalrus
9b	9b	"Rod's Big Jump"	Bill Speers	Scott Albert	January 15, 2018	2018	108	1.37
Rod tries to make a jump.
10a	10a	"Beaver Dam Rescue"	Bill Speers	Aaron Barnett	February 13, 2018	2018	110	0.88
When Ward Beaver accidentally breaks the dam, Team Top Wing race to the rescue.
10b	10b	"The Great Goat-Cart Race"	Bill Speers	Scott Albert	February 13, 2018	2018	110	0.88
It's time for the big goat cart race, but when a Treegoat races off-road into the river, Team Top Wing have to rescue the goat and the race.
11a	11a	"The Banana Bandits"	Bill Speers	James Backshall and Jeff Sweeney	February 15, 2018	2018	111	0.93
Monkey bandits hijack Rhonda's bananas! The Cadets rescue the bananas and Turtle Train when the monkeys strike again. Special Guest Star: Ryan Key, Adam Gontier and Jason Wade as the Banana Bandits
11b	11b	"Shirley's Rocket Adventure"	Bill Speers	Scott Albert	February 15, 2018	2018	111	0.93
Shirley accidentally turbo-charges her little plane.
12a	12a	"A Turtlely Awesome Adventure"	Bill Speers	Scott Albert	February 27, 2018	2018	113	0.93
Brody has to rescue his pals when they get caught in the Shipwreck Cove whirlpool.
12b	12b	"Brody Goes Home"	Bill Speers	James Backshall and Jeff Sweeney	February 27, 2018	2018	113	0.93
Brody and Team Top Wing race to the rescue when Brody's sister slips off the top of Puffin Peaks. Special Guest Star: Vaden Todd Lewis as Big Bill and Liz Phair as Brody's Mom
13a	13a	"Top Wing's Eggcellent Rescue"	Bill Speers	Scott Albert	March 1, 2018	2018	112	0.83
When Sandy Stork loses her glasses and mixes up the eggs in her delivery, Top Wing race to get the right eggs back home before they hatch. Special Guest Star: Alanis Morissette as Sandy Stork
13b	13b	"The Great Pearl-A-Palooza Caper"	Bill Speers	Anita Kapila	March 1, 2018	2018	112	0.83
Chomps and Rocco take Big Swirl's famous pearls.
14a	14a	"Birthday Bandits!"	Bill Speers	Dave Dias	March 28, 2018	2018	114	0.74
The Monkey Bandits take Rod's birthday cake and Road-Wing.
14b	14b	"The Mystery of the Haunted Cave"	Bill Speers	Scott Kraft	March 28, 2018	2018	114	0.74
As Bea helps Brody and Rod earn their Overnight Badge, Baddy McBat tries to scare them, but the Cadets rescue him.
15a	15a	"Cap'n Dilly's Dance Party"	Bill Speers	Dave Dias	April 23, 2018	June 24, 2018	117	0.87
When Cap'n Dilly's dance party gets lost at sea at night, Brody faces his fear of the dark.
15b	15b	"Top Wing Dream Team"	Bill Speers	Scott Albert	April 23, 2018	June 24, 2018	117	0.87
Team Top Wing Cadets must learn to work together to earn their CoPilot Badges.
16a	16a	"Rod and Brody's Jungle Adventure"	Bill Speers	James Backshall and Jeff Sweeney	April 25, 2018	2018	115	0.79
Rod and Brody try to earn a Jungle Exploring badge, but get lost and must work together to help Swift find them.
16b	16b	"Cadet for a Day"	Bill Speers	Aaron Barnett	April 25, 2018	2018	115	0.79
Lucky students get to be "Cadets for a Day."
17a	17a	"Penny Rescues the Treasure"	Bill Speers	Scott Albert	May 25, 2018	June 17, 2018	116	0.83
Penny races to save the lost treasure of Shipwreck Cove and Commodore Smurkturkski III.
17b	17b	"Penny Rocks the Road Wing"	Bill Speers	Meghan Read	May 25, 2018	June 17, 2018	116	0.83
Rod has to stay in bed with a cold. Penny has to learn to pilot the Road-Wing on the fly.
18a	18a	"Shirley's Sleepover Adventure"	Bill Speers	Brian Hartigan	June 5, 2018	2018	119	0.73
A collapsing tree forces Shirley to sleep over with the Top Wing cadets.
18b	18b	"A Little Off Track"	Bill Speers	Scott Albert	June 5, 2018	2018	119	0.73
Betty McBat challenges Rod to see who is faster, but when Baddy tries to cheat, Rod has to rescue Betty.
19a	19a	"Surfin' the Cave"	Bill Speers	Evan Thaler Hickey	June 7, 2018	2018	118	0.75
When Brody's turbo-surfing friends get trapped in a cave, Brody and Penny race against the tide to rescue them. Note: This is the only episode to feature the upgraded Splash Wing as the Puffin Dive. It was later succeeded to the new Splash Diver in Season 2.
19b	19b	"Top Wing Rescues the Lemon Shack"	Bill Speers	Meghan Reed	June 7, 2018	2018	118	0.75
The Cadets try to earn a badge by running the Lemon Shack.
20a	20a	"Baddy Up to No Good"	Bill Speers	Evan Thaler Hickey	August 3, 2018	2018	121	0.97
When Baddy McBat rescues Big Swirl residents from problems he caused, the Cadets end up rescuing Baddy.
20b	20b	"Rooster Brewster"	Bill Speers	Brian Hartigan	August 3, 2018	2018	121	0.97
The cadets accidentally lose Rod's Toy.
21a	21a	"Bea's Day Off"	Bill Speers	Scott Albert	September 24, 2018	2018	123	0.58
Trying to give Bea a day off, Swift's jet goes haywire, they need Bea to race to the rescue.
21b	21b	"Top Wing Big Swirl Games"	Bill Speers	Meghan Reed	September 25, 2018	2018	123	0.56
Brody feels upset about skateboarding, because he can only do some surfing.
22a	22a	"Flying Banana Bandits!"	Bill Speers	James Backshall and Jeff Sweeney	September 26, 2018	2018	126	0.63
The Banana Bandits take Shirley's delivery fliers and are headed for Commodore's hot air balloon.
22b	22b	"Penny's Chillin' Playdate"	Bill Speers	James Backshall & Jeff Sweeney	September 27, 2018	2018	126	0.65
Penny has to rescue Anyu and Yuka.
23a	23a	"Junior Cadets Rescue"	Bill Speers	Scott Albert	October 26, 2018	2018	125	0.78
Top Wing are training some friends to be “junior Cadets.” When Baddy tries to show he can be a rescue hero, all the Cadets have to team up to rescue Baddy!
23b	23b	"Sunken Treasure Race"	Bill Speers	Brian Hartigan	October 26, 2018	2018	125	0.78
The cadets, the bats and the crocs have a race to save the treasure.
24a	24a	"Turtle Train Clean Up"	Bill Speers	Dave Dias	October 29, 2018	2018	120	0.68
The Cadets go green and clean-up Big Swirl. When the train loaded with recycling rolls out of control, it's Top Wing to the rescue!
24b	24b	"Anyu's Friendship Party"	Bill Speers	James Backshall & Jeff Sweeney	October 30, 2018	2018	120	0.70
Penny's friend Anyu throws a Friendship Party! Team Top Wing VROOMS into action to make sure everyone gets there on time.
25a	25a	"Penny Rescues the Aqua Wing"	Bill Speers	James Backshall & Jeff Sweeney	October 31, 2018	2018	122	0.51
When Rocco and Chomps race off in Penny's Aqua-Wing, she must use Chomps' sub to get it back.
25b	25b	"Bananas Away"	Bill Speers	Meghan Read	November 1, 2018	2018	122	0.67
As Sandy Stork delivers party treats to the school, the Banana Bandits take her plane; the Cadets will have to rescue the plane and the party. Special Guest Star: Alanis Morissette as Sandy Stork
26a	26a	"Top Wing Rescues Survivor Bear"	Bill Speers	James Backshall and Jeff Sweeney	December 21, 2018 (Note: This episode was released early on the Nick Jr. app, VOD, and iTunes on November 15, 2018.)	2018	124	0.75
The Cadets team up to rescue TV adventure star Survivor Bear, who comes to Big Swirl to brave Icy Summit.
26b	26b	"Timmy Wings It"	Bill Speers	Scott Albert	December 21, 2018	2018	124	0.75
When Swift hurts his wing, Timmy Turtle has to help pilot the Flash-Wing to save the day.

=== Season 2 (2019–20) ===
No. overall	No. in season	Title	Directed by	Written by	Original air date (U.S.)	Original air date (Canada)	Prod. code	U.S. viewers (millions)
27a	1a	"Cheep, Chirp, and the Pirate's Treasure"	Bill Speers	Jeff Sweeney	March 1, 2019	2019	201	0.58
Cap'n Dilly makes the chicks mini-pirates to find a treasure chest key.
27b	1b	"Rod's Family Popcorn Party"	Bill Speers	Meghan Read	March 1, 2019	2019	201	0.58
Rod's little brother Romeo is just a "little chicken" until Rod's whole family needs to be rescued.
28	2	"Top Wing Rescues the Academy"	Bill Speers	Scott Albert	March 15, 2019	2019	202	0.65
The Cadets must pass Inspector Eagle-Eye's test, or Speedy and Bea will be sent back to teacher's school; Team Top Wing ace the test and rescue the Inspector using the Headquarters Command Flyer: a part of the HQ that can fly. Special Guest Star: Mike Ness as Inspector Eagle-Eye
29a	3a	"Top Wing Sting"	Bill Speers	Brian Hartigan	March 29, 2019	2019	203	0.70
Rod is excited to sing at Rhonda's until Chomps and Rocco take the piano.
29b	3b	"Big Banana Break-In"	Bill Speers	Amy Benham	March 29, 2019	2019	203	0.70
Margo the Monkey and the Banana Bandits break into Headquarters and try to take off with the HQ Command Flyer.
30a	4a	"Top Wing Spring Fling"	Bill Speers	James R. Backshall	April 12, 2019	2019	204	0.58
Spring means Commodore Smurkturkski gets a new little chick, but Sandy Stork loses the egg. Special Guest Star: Alanis Morissette as Sandy Stork
30b	4b	"Dancing Daffodil Rescue"	Bill Speers	Scott Albert	April 12, 2019	2019	204	0.58
The flower that makes someone or something sneeze and never be cured again, is the dancing daffodils.
31a	5a	"Penny Rescues Survivor Bear"	Bill Speers	James R. Backshall	May 6, 2019	2019	205	0.43
When Survivor Bear heads under water, Penny and the rest of the team have to rescue him using the HQ Command Flyer.
31b	5b	"Penny's Jungle Adventure"	Bill Speers	Scott Albert	May 7, 2019	2019	205	0.53
Rod and Penny rescue Sammy Monkey, while Penny earns her Jungle Explorer Badge.
32a	6a	"Trouble With Treegoats"	Bill Speers	James R. Backshall	May 8, 2019	2019	206	0.39
The Cadets are put to the test as they baby-sit some rambunctious tree goats, who can climb anything.
32b	6b	"Rhonda's Rockin' Family Reunion"	Bill Speers	Brian Hartigan	May 9, 2019	2019	206	0.49
Rhonda's very big family comes for a reunion.
33a	7a	"Shirley's Nutty Vacation"	Bill Speeers	Scott Albert	May 31, 2019	2019	207	0.69
The Cadets send stressed Shirley on a remote treetop cabin vacation when she accidentally unmoors the cabin.
33b	7b	"Amazing Action Rescue"	Bill Speers	Jennifer Daley	May 31, 2019	2019	207	0.69
Baddy wants to be in Reg Goosling's best adventure picture ever, but the Cadets rescue Baddy and end up in the picture instead.
34a	8a	"Swift's Family Flying Ace"	Bill Speers	Jeff Sweeney	September 7, 2019	2019	208	0.48
When Baddy takes an old plane, Swift's Grandpa talks him through an exciting landing of the unfamiliar plane.
34b	8b	"Timmy's Pirate Adventure"	Bill Speers	Elize Morgan	September 7, 2019	2019	208	0.48
Timmy Turtle, looking for a perfect hiding spot, ends up on Dilly's ship and Discovery that Dilly took Rod's accordion!
35a	9a	"Big Swirl Beach Watch"	Bill Speers	Jeff Sweeney	September 28, 2019	2019	209	0.39
New lifeguard David Hasselhawg teaches the Cadets life-saving skills, but the Cadets have to rescue Davey!
35b	9b	"Survivor Bear's Adventure Tour"	Bill Speers	James Backshall	September 28, 2019	2019	209	0.39
Survivor Bear leads a tour on his new Adventure Boat. Team Top Wing use the HQ Command Flyer to rescue the boat!
36a	10a	"The Haunting of Pirate Cove"	Bill Speers	Brian Hartigan	October 12, 2019	2019	216	0.36
The Cadets discover a haunted pirate treasure and sneak into Pirate Town to find out who or what is haunting the place. Note: This is the first episode to feature the updated theme song animation with the cadets in their new regular outfits and uniforms and vehicles and Speedy and Bea piloting the Command Flyer.
36b	10b	"Penny and Bea Rescue Team"	Bill Speers	Jennifer Daley	October 12, 2019	2019	216	0.36
Bea helps Penny with her Underwater Repair Badge when Earl's submersible barge springs a leak and needs rescuing.
37	11	"Top Wing Levels Up"	Bill Speers	Brian Hartigan	November 30, 2019	2019	210	0.41
The Cadets graduate to level 2 and training with new uniforms and new vehicles; as everyone gathers for the ceremony, the Cadets race to rescue Penny's family using the new vehicles they have not yet been trained on. Note: This episode take places before the events of the previous episode, due to episodes airing out of production order.
38	12	"A Top Wing Christmas"	Bill Speers	Brian Hartigan	December 7, 2019	2019	217	0.39
It's a special white Christmas for the Cadets as they celebrate Christmas with Penny's Penguin family. But when Santa crashes his way to deliver the Penguin's presents, the Cadets have to rescue Santa AND Penny's little brother!
39a	13a	"Gone Gondola Gone"	Bill Speers	Amy Benham	December 21, 2019	2019	215	0.40
While the cadets work on their snowboarding badge, a falling tree knocks a gondola loose.
39b	13b	"Hasselhawg Swim Lesson"	Bill Speers	Jeff Sweeney	December 21, 2019	2019	215	0.40
The Cadets help Davey Hasselhawg give the little Turkskis a swim lesson, and then have to rescue Davey from a whirlpool.
40a	14a	"Arrgh Me Snugglies"	Bill Speers	Jennifer Daley	June 15, 2020	2020	211	0.34
Rod's beloved Rooster Brewster goes missing, and the Cadets must rescue the snugglie, so everyone can rest again.
40b	14b	"Earl the Gadget Squirrel"	Bill Speers	Jeff Sweeney	June 15, 2020	2020	211	0.34
Earl the Gadget Squirrel build T and Shelly super fast turbo surf boards that one of them goes out of control. The Cadets come to the rescue.
41a	15a	"Inspector Eagle Eye Returns"	Bill Speers	James R. Backshall	June 16, 2020	2020	212	0.41
When Inspector Eagle-Eye tests the cadets on their new vehicles, Swift rescues Baddy and his new Zip-Flash.
41b	15b	"Lemon Shack Hi Jack"	Bill Speers	Brian Hartigan	June 16, 2020	2020	212	0.41
The Cadets have to rescue the HQ Command Flyer after Margo uses it to fly off with the Lemon Shack.
42a	16a	"Ker-Splash Canyon Tour"	Bill Speers	James R. Backshall	June 17, 2020	2020	213	0.32
The Cadets rescue the famous author Trini Treegoat.
42b	16b	"Big Swirl 500"	Bill Speers	Elize Morgan	June 17, 2020	2020	213	0.32
The car Earl built for Shirley's round-the-island race doesn't work exactly as planned.
43a	17a	"Big Swirl Blackout"	Bill Speers	Elize Morgan	June 18, 2020	2020	214	0.32
Sandy Stork flies Rhonda's nephew Niko to Big Swirl for a party when Earl blows out the power on the island.
43b	17b	"Brenda's Gift"	Bill Speers	Scott Albert	June 18, 2020	2020	214	0.32
Brody's sister Brenda and Finn get lost in the jungle. It's up to Team Top Wing to find them in the dense foliage of Big Swirl.
44a	18a	"The Big Swirl Balloon Race"	Bill Speers	Brian Hartigan	June 19, 2020	2020	218	0.34
The Cadets participating in a balloon race around Big Swirl Island.
44b	18b	"Kelp is on the Way"	Bill Speers	Dave Dias	June 19, 2020	2020	218	0.34
Timmy takes his goldfish Squirt for a walk and accidentally drops his bowl into the river; the cadets have to find him.
45	19	"Top Wing Rescues Ker-Splash Canyon"	Bill Speers	James R. Backshall	June 22, 2020	2020	219	0.30
The beavers fix-up an amazing water park on Big Swirl: Ker-Splash Canyon! Rushing water endangers a group of reclusive Dodos and threatens to destroy the canyon. The Cadets race underground to rescue the Dodos and the canyon!
46a	20a	"Brody's Flying Lesson"	Bill Speers	Scott Albert	June 23, 2020	2020	220	0.28
Brody earns his HQ Command Flyer Pilot's badge when Shirley accidentally launches the Command Flyer!
46b	20b	"Brody's Purple Pearl Rescue"	Bill Speers	Jennifer Daley	June 23, 2020	2020	220	0.28
Baddy McBat takes Brody's Splash-Diver so he can make off with rare, precious purple pearls.
47a	21a	"Pirate Playzone"	Bill Speers	Dave Dias	June 24, 2020	2020	221	0.28
Cap'n Dilly and the Cadets build a Pirate Playzone in Ker-Splash Canyon. But Captain Swabby takes the treasure chests!
47b	21b	"King of the Dodos"	Bill Speers	Jeff Sweeny	June 24, 2020	2020	221	0.28
The Dodos think Brody is the legendary Dodo King and do whatever he says until Baddy McBat takes the crown.
48a	22a	"Waterfall Jump"	Bill Speers	Scott Albert	June 25, 2020	2020	222	0.25
Chomps and Rocco challenge Brody and Penny to a whitewater trick competition but Rocco nearly falls off Double Falls!
48b	22b	"Top Wing Tour Guides"	Bill Speers	James R. Backshall	June 25, 2020	2020	222	0.25
When Shirley's city cousins visit Big Swirl, things don't exactly go as planned on their exciting island tour.
49a	23a	"Survivor Bear and the Secret of Ker-Splash Canyon"	Bill Speers	Scott Albert	June 29, 2020	2020	223	0.23
Della helps Survivor Bear explore Ker-Splash's secret caves. The Cadets must escape before they're locked in forever!
49b	23b	"Great Ker-Splash Race"	Bill Speers	Jennifer Daley	June 29, 2020	2020	223	0.23
Baddy cheats to try to win the Ker-Splash Canyon Race, and the cadets have to rescue the other race.
50a	24a	"Earl's Nutty Invention"	Bill Speers	Jeff Sweeny	June 30, 2020	2021	224	0.28
The cadets must rescue Earl and race him back to Big Swirl before his Coco Cruiser ruins the little Turkski's birthday party.
50b	24b	"Big Swirl Break-Up"	Bill Speers	Dave Dias	June 30, 2020	2021	224	0.28
Inspector Eagle Eye wants to send the cadets to different Top Wing training centers to be lead cadets.
51a	25a	"Dodo Egg Scramble"	Bill Speers	Brian Hartigan	July 1, 2020	2021	225	0.38
When Della Dodo's eggs are washed away, it's Cadets to the rescue to save Della's little brothers and sister!
51b	25b	"Trini's Trintastic Big Swirl Tour"	Bill Speers	James R. Backshall	July 1, 2020	2021	225	0.38
When Baddy takes Trini for a tour of Big Swirl's most dangerous areas, he nearly gets them trapped in Cave-in Cavern.
52a	26a	"Baddy and the Bad Wings"	Bill Speers	Jennifer Daley	July 2, 2020	2021	226	0.26
Baddy teams up with Betty, Chomps and Rocco to hijack the HQ Command Flyer so he can take over Big Swirl!
52b	26b	"Cheep and Chirp's Splashy Surf Show"	Bill Speers	James R. Backshall	July 2, 2020	2021	226	0.26
Davey Hasselhawg has to get Cheep, Chirp and friends ready for an awesome wakeboard show when Brody is called to a rescue. Note: This is the series finale.
