= Spike Team =

Italian animated series

- The Spike Team with Lucky
- Created by: Andrea Lucchetta
- Developed by: Andrea Lucchetta; Maria Claudia Di Genova; Andrea Greppi; Bruno Enna
- Written by: Andrea Lucchetta; Maria Claudia Di Genova; Andrea Greppi; Bruno Enna
- Voices of: (Italian version); Perla Liberatori as Jo; Gaia Bolognesi as Victoria; Eva Padoan as Beth; Gemma Donati as Patty; Letizia Ciampa as Susan; Laura Lenghi as Ann Mary; Andrea Lucchetta as Lucky (English version); Julie Lemieux as Jo; Stacey DePass as Victoria; Alyson Court as Patty; Bryn McAuley as Ann Mary; Kelly Pekar as Susan (Season 1); Steph Lynn Robinson as Susan (Season 2); Megan Fahlenbock as Beth; Lyon Smith as Lucky
- Theme music composer: Giovanni Cera; Angelo Poggi
- Opening theme: "Spike Team", performed by Jenny B
- Country of origin: Italy
- Original language: Italian
- No. of seasons: 2
- No. of episodes: 52

Production
- Running time: 26 minutes
- Production companies: Rai Fiction; Lucky Dreams; Graphilm

Original release
- Network: Rai 2, Rai Gulp
- Release: November 21, 2010 – present

Spike Team is an Italian animated series created by Andrea Lucchetta, and produced by Rai Fiction, Lucky Dreams and Graphilm. It revolves around a volleyball team of six girls and their coach, Lucky.

The first season aired in Italy from November 2010 to May 2011, while the second season debuted on July 17, 2014; the third one, along with a live-action, is in production.

A special 40-minute-long episode, Il sogno di Brent (Brent's Dream), was presented in September 2012 during the Paralympic Games and opened, on December 3, the European Day of People with Disabilities. It then aired in Italy on December 1, 2013.

== Plot ==
Madame A, an unscrupulous businesswoman, controls Evertown, a city without green in which sport is no longer practiced. The only land yet to be conquered is the one on which stands the Spikersfield College, but, as it isn't for sale, she attempts to kill the owner Armand Alea. The will of the man, however, states that, in order to take possession not only of the land and the school, but also of the Torch of Olympia, preserved in the museum of the institute, the potential buyers must participate in a volleyball tournament, the Alea Cup. Against Madame A's team, the Black Roses, there's the Spike Team, formed by Jo, Victoria, Beth, Patty, Susan, and Ann Mary, coached by Lucky, a former volleyball champion. Thanks to the tournament, the six girls not only discover their strengths and weaknesses, but also the special virtues that, represented by six gems, are able to re-ignite the Olympic flame.

== Characters ==
=== Main characters ===
- Johanna "Jo" Robertson
  Charismatic and bold, only black player (of African-Jamaican heritage), she never gives up and doesn't hesitate to help others, but is very proud. Due to the difficult life she had, she thinks that nothing is free and disappointments are always ambush. After the death of her parents Eric and Isabel Arriaga, she grew up in the poor, urban town of Evertown with her grandmother Rina, her twin brother Julio and the eight-year-old brother Ramon: to help her family she dropped out of college, despite her intention to continue to study, and began working in one of Madame A's beauty farms as a cleaner. In exchange for a scholarship, she agrees to enter the Spike Team, becoming the captain. She has a crush on Carlos and finds her gem, the ruby of Strength, but shown in episode 23.
- Victoria "Vicky" Silvestri
  Disciplined, tidy, and obedient, her dream is winning at least once, but without tricks. In college, she sleeps in the same room as Susan and her family belongs to the upper class: her mother Nicole Sanders is a tennis player, and her father James is a former equestrian champion who had to give up the Olympics due to an injury that made him lame. For this reason, he wants his daughter to absolutely win horse-riding races. She has a special bond with Phil and finds her gem, the turquoise of Loyalty, but shown in episode 12.
- Elizabeth "Beth" Monroe
  Shy and sweet, she loves books, poetry, and comics. She is a sincere and discreet girl who always tells the truth. She lives with her father, Nathan, chief fireman, her mother Gwen, a quiet Irish woman, her older brother Adam, who attends the police academy, and her pet turtle Ruga. She dreams of becoming a writer and is good at playing piano. She is in love with Mark and finds her gem, the emerald of Courage, but shown in episode 21.
- Patricia "Patty" Tan Denver
  A studious Asian girl, she's always up to date with the latest technology and has a strong will. Born in the Asian country of Singapore, her mother Ai Linn Tan died when she was seven years old, and Patty has traveled all over the world because his father, Charles Fitzpatrick Denver, is a United Nations (UN) diplomat. Never being at home, Mr. Denver has left his daughter in the hands of foster parents who spoiled her with many gifts: so, Patty has never had to work to get something. She initially clashes with Jo, but then changes and shows a strong need to be accepted and have a family. She finds her gem, the amethyst of the spirit of Sacrifice, but shown in episode 5.
- Susan Bredford
  Careless, lazy, and a little clumsy, she's always cheerful and positive, and her humor is contagious. She likes eating, sleeping, playing video games, and watching TV. She lives with her parents, Kevin and Laura Carter, and her eight-year-old sister Martha; she also has a maternal grandmother, Emma. She finds her gem, the topaz of Balance, but shown in episode 8.
- Ann Mary Lewit
  Elegant and snobby, she's the youngest daughter of a very important family of Evertown: her father Roger is a rich businessman, and her mother Stella Ardakis is a woman of class. She also has two older brothers, Hugh and Steven, who work in her father's companies. A smart girl who loves pink, she is very kind and always sees the best of everyone. She dreams of becoming a fashion designer. She finds her gem, the lapis lazuli of Perseverance, but shown in episode 17.
- Lucky
  A former champion, after giving up volleyball he worked as a gardener at Villa Ruskin, but then his old, retired coach Luther convinced him to return to the world of sport to train the Spike Team. Determined, generous, and ironic, he has faith in the values of sport and doesn't tolerate foul play. He's in love with Grace. He is based on Italian former volleyball player Andrea Lucchetta.

=== Other characters ===
- Julio Robertson
  Jo's twin brother, he lives in the poor, urban town. He expelled school and likes basketball and motorbikes: his dream is breaking into the world of racing. He has a crush on Ann Mary.
- Carlos Montero
  He's a tough Spaniard boy who lives with his mother, Francisca Gracia. He spends a lot of time in the poor, urban town with his best friend Julio and likes skateboards. He works at a car wash to earn money to cure his mother. He has a crush on Jo.
- Mark McGowan
  Kind and sophisticated, he lives in uptown Evertown, although he spent most of his life on the boat of his parents, owners of a sail yard. He likes poetry and is very popular among girls.
- Philip "Phil" Berger
  Funny and ironic, nice Jewish boy, he has a perfect pitch for music. He has a crush on Victoria, and his sister Nadia lives in Tel Aviv, Israel.
- Justin Clarke
  He is the leader of a gang of bullies of the Norton College, a school for rich kids, and has a crush on Irina. He has a sister, Kate, who plays in the Black Roses.
- Irina Skinner
  The captain of the Black Roses, she's a loyal girl who doesn't like foul play. She starts dating Justin.
- Armand Alea
  The owner and president of Spikersfield College, he's an archaeologist and researcher of ancient sports memorabilia. He's thrown off a cliff by the men of Madame A, but manages to escape and, with a fake will, announces the volleyball tournament that will decide the fate of the school. He hides in a secret room of the museum, under the hall of the Torch: the only person who knows he's still alive is Luther, and then Grace.
- Luther
  Guardian of the sports facilities of the Spikersfield College, he's Lucky's former coach and manages to convince him to return to the world of sport and train the Spike Team.
- Grace Loton
  Professor of Archaeology at the Spikersfield College, she was a cheerleader. She is the daughter of Ralph, a mechanic, and Jenny Kowalsky, a teacher. Following Armand Alea's death, she becomes the executor, the new director of the college, and the promoter of the tournament.
- Vito Revelli
  He's the owner of Vito's, a kiosk on the beach, where Lucky often goes along with the Spike Team.
- Amalia Grabhall "Madame A"
  A businesswoman without scruples, she wants to take possession of the whole Evertown. In order to participate in the tournament, she buys the best women's volleyball team in the market, the Black Roses, and takes an unconventional coach, Max Coachrane. She has a cat named Veleno and is allergic to flowers; she's always looking for ways to stay young and fight the tummy, baldness, and wrinkles.
- Max Coachrane "Coach Match"
  The coach of the Black Roses, he wants to win at any cost.
- Pereira
- Pinkett
- Mimicrì and Linxy

== Episodes ==
=== First season (2010–2011) ===
No.	Italian title English dub title	Italian air date (Rai 2)
1	"La lunga mano di Madame A" (The long arm of Madame A)	November 21, 2010
2	"La sfida impossibile" (The impossible challenge)	November 28, 2010
3	"Si comincia da zero" (Starting from zero)	December 5, 2010
4	"Le sei dita di una mano" (The six fingers of one hand)	December 12, 2010
5	"Il valore del sacrificio" (The value of sacrifice)	December 19, 2010
6	"Dovere o piacere" (Duty or pleasure)	January 2, 2011
7	"Sfida sleale" (Unfair challenge)	January 9, 2011
8	"Una sporca trappola" (A dirty trap)	January 16, 2011
9	"Il trionfo di Madame" (The triumph of Madame)	January 23, 2011
10	"Cercando una strada" (Searching for a way)	January 30, 2011
11	"La scelta" (The choice)	February 6, 2011
12	"La capitana" (The captain)	February 13, 2011
13	"Una torcia fantasma" (A ghost torch)	February 20, 2011
14	"L'abbraccio dello squalo" (The embrace of the shark)	February 27, 2011
15	"Musica e complotti" (Music and plots)	March 6, 2011
16	"Salvando un college" (Saving a college)	March 13, 2011
17	"Un terribile dilemma" (A terrible dilemma)	March 20, 2011
18	"Attacco frontale" (Frontal attack)	March 27, 2011
19	"Confida nel tuo nemico" (Trust in your enemy)	April 3, 2011
20	"Fiesta" (Fiesta)	April 10, 2011
21	"Arbitro venduto" (Sold referee)	April 17, 2011
22	"Ritorno in pista" (Back on track)	April 24, 2011
23	"La forza della tigre" (The strength of the tiger)	May 1, 2011
24	"La conferma di una squadra" (The confirmation of a team)	May 8, 2011
25	"I conti del passato" (The accounts of the past)	May 15, 2011
26	"Il sapore della vittoria" (The taste of victory)	May 22, 2011

=== Second season (2014) ===
No.	Italian title English dub title	Italian air date (Rai Gulp)
1	"Un nuovo inizio" (A new beginning)	July 17, 2014
2	"In trappola" (In a trap)	July 17, 2014
3	"Il Braciere di Olimpia" (The Cauldron of Olympia)	July 18, 2014
4	"Spike Camp"	July 18, 2014
5	"Lo spirito di una squadra" (The spirit of a team)	July 19, 2014
6	"Un amore virtuale" (A virtual love)	July 19, 2014
7	"Orgoglio e pregiudizio" (Pride and prejudice)	July 20, 2014
8	"Spike oui"	July 20, 2014
9	"Il segreto della Torcia" (The secret of the Torch)	July 21, 2014
10	"Vita da college" (College life)	July 21, 2014
11	"Una spia tra noi" (A spy among us)	July 22, 2014
12	"Segni dal passato" (Signs from the past)	July 22, 2014
13	"La bussola vichinga" (The Viking compass)	July 23, 2014
14	"Sconfitte e amori" (Losses and loves)	July 23, 2014
15	"Tensioni" (Tensions)	July 24, 2014
16	"Dentro o fuori" (In or out)	July 24, 2014
17	"Ironman"	July 25, 2014
18	"La storia di Brent" (Brent's story)	July 25, 2014
19	"Fuori squadra" (Out of the team)	July 26, 2014
20	"Doppio gioco" (Double game)	July 26, 2014
21	"Solleva, rotea, colpisci" (Lift, spin, hit)	July 27, 2014
22	"Tradimenti" (Betrayals)	July 27, 2014
23	"Caerleon"	July 28, 2014
24	"Dodici cavalieri e un re" (Twelve knights and a king)	July 28, 2014
25	"Esse di spada, esse di squadra" (S of sword, s of squad)	July 29, 2014
26	"Six for fight"	July 29, 2014

=== Third season ===
No.	Italian title English dub title	Italian air date
1	"Sette" (Seven)	TBA
2	"Susan"	TBA
3	"Ann Mary"	TBA
4	"Patty"	TBA
5	"Vicky"	TBA
6	"Beth"	TBA
7	"Franci"	TBA
8	"Jo"	TBA
9	"Lucky"	TBA
10	"Terra" (Earth)	TBA
11	"Legami" (Bound)	TBA
12	"L'olimpiade ha inizio" (The Olympics begin)	TBA
13	"Una vera squadra" (A true team)	TBA
14	"Thai Indigestio" (Indigestible Thai)	TBA
15	"Il girone si chiude" (The round closes)	TBA
16	"Zodiaco" (Zodiac)	TBA
17	"Buon divertimento Spike!" " (Have fun, Spike!)"	TBA
18	"Divise" (Divided)	TBA
19	"La scelta di Jo" (Jo's choice)	TBA
20	"Fantasmi" (Ghosts)	TBA
21	"Un altro pianeta" (Another planet)	TBA
22	"Alchimie di squadra" " (Team alchemies)"	TBA
23	"Davide vs Golia" (David vs Goliath)	TBA
24	"Le vestali" (7 vestals)	TBA
25	"Le leonesse scendono in campo" (The lionesses take the field)	TBA
26	"Spike Team"	TBA

== Broadcast ==
Spike Team has been acquired by Foothill Entertainment for English-language countries, by Rose Entertainment for South America and by Ypsilon Entertainment for Spain-language countries. The series debuted on Duronto TV in Bangladesh on 15 April 2018.

== Books ==
- Lo Bianco, Fabrizio (23 March 2011). Spike Team - Il grande sogno. Fabbri Editori. p. 192. ISBN 978-88-451-6220-6.
- Lo Bianco, Fabrizio (23 March 2011). Spike Team - La partita del secolo. Fabbri Editori. p. 192. ISBN 978-88-451-6219-0.
- Lo Bianco, Fabrizio (20 April 2011). Spike Team - Il nostro diario. Fabbri Editori. p. 128. ISBN 978-88-451-6221-3.
- Lo Bianco, Fabrizio (24 August 2011). Spike Team - Fuori campo. Fabbri Editori. p. 192. ISBN 978-88-451-6444-6.
- Lo Bianco, Fabrizio (24 August 2011). Spike Team - Sabbia rovente. Fabbri Editori. p. 192. ISBN 978-88-451-6445-3.
