= Duronto TV =

Bengali-language children's channel

Duronto TV দুরন্ত টিভি
- Country: Bangladesh
- Broadcast area: Nationwide
- Headquarters: Banani, Dhaka

Programming
- Picture format: 1080i HDTV (downscaled to 16:9 576i for SDTV sets)

Ownership
- Owner: Barind Media Limited

History
- Launched: 5 October 2017; 9 years ago

Links
- Website: duronto.tv

Duronto TV (Bengali: দুরন্ত টিভি; lit. 'restless TV') is a Bangladeshi Bengali-language satellite and cable children's television channel, and the first of its kind in the country. It was initially licensed in 2013 as "Renaissance TV", but was later renamed to its current name. The channel began test broadcasts on 5 October 2017, and commenced official broadcasts on 15 October 2017.

Duronto TV is the first Bengali-language children's television channel. The director of the channel is Abhijit Chowdhury, and Quazi Shahidul Islam is the head of broadcast operations and engineering, Minhaz Uddin being the head of sales and marketing, and Sunjida Siddique Sumona being the head of programme. It is owned by Barind Media Limited, a subsidiary of Renaissance Group. Duronto TV's programming consists of live action, usually local, and animated shows, usually foreign.

== History ==
=== Licensing and initiation ===
In November 2013, the Bangladesh Telecommunication Regulatory Commission (BTRC) granted Barind Media Limited a license to broadcast "Renaissance TV", which would be Bangladesh's first children's oriented television channel. However, over time, the channel was renamed to Duronto TV. The channel received its frequency allocation in January 2015. Before its launch, in July 2017, Duronto TV, along with four other television channels in Bangladesh, signed an agreement with UNICEF to air children's programming for one minute.

=== Launch ===
On 5 October 2017, Duronto TV began broadcasting as the first Bengali-language children's television channel. Its logo, consisting of the Bengali text, "দুরন্ত", next to a CGI-animated tiger, was also unveiled that day at the Pan Pacific Sonargaon hotel in Dhaka. Bangladesh's then minister of information, Hasanul Haq Inu, had stated that Bangladesh was behind in many sectors, and a television channel specifically for children was in need so they can bring the country ahead in the future. The channel officially began broadcasting on 15 October of that year.

The channel's initial programming line consisted of local live action shows alongside animated programming. Over time, more programming got added to the channel, by grouping them as 'seasons', such as with 'Season 2' that debuted on 14 January 2018. On 15 April 2018, Duronto's third season debuted, with the premiere of local shows, such as Bhuter Baksho and Adbhut, and acquired animated shows such as Justin Time and Spike Team. On 15 July 2018, Duronto's fourth season debuted, with the premiere of three local shows, which are Shohor Theke Dure, Panchabhuj, and Khatta Mitha, and animated shows such as Alisa Knows What to Do!, Bob the Builder, Messy Goes to OKIDO, and Rainbow Ruby.

The channel aired the first three films from the Home Alone film series in October 2018. On 14 April 2019, the popular Nickelodeon television series, SpongeBob SquarePants, debuted on Duronto TV, as a part of its seventh season. Sisimpur began airing on Duronto in July 2019. BBC signed a licensing deal with Duronto TV for a localized version of Mastermind titled Mastermind Family Bangladesh, which premiered on 13 October 2019, as a part of the channel's ninth season which debuted on the same day. On 12 January 2020, its tenth season debuted, with the premiere of shows such as The Magic Roundabout, Mini Ninjas, and The Garfield Show.

Duronto's twelfth season debuted on 12 July 2020, with the premiere of Animesh Aich's Boka Bhoot, along with animated shows Pororo the Little Penguin and Yakari. On 11 October 2020, Duronto's thirteenth season began with the premiere of The Adventures of Tintin, The Minimghty Kids, Bobby and Bill, and Florrie's Dragons on the channel. On 10 January 2021, Duronto's fourteenth season debuted, with the premiere of three local shows, which are Bhulostein, Kattush Kuttush, and Laal Kohinoor, and two animated shows, which are Martin Morning and Zigby.

On 1 March 2021, The Penguins of Madagascar and Kung Fu Panda: Legends of Awesomeness debuted on the channel, as a part of its fifteenth season which debuted on 11 April. The channel's sixteenth season debuted on 1 August 2021, with the premiere of Rolie Polie Olie, Dora the Explorer, Top Wing, and Franklin and Friends. On 1 November 2021, Duronto's seventeenth season debuted, with the premiere of two educational series, The English Club and Banan Maane Spelling. From 28 November to 2 December 2021, Duronto TV had premiered five Iranian films.

On 30 January 2022, Duronto TV's eighteenth season debuted, with the premiere of two Nickelodeon animated series Blaze and the Monster Machines, Bubble Guppies, and others. In March 2022, Bangladesh's Health Ministry and UNICEF developed a cooking show for young chefs titled Shorno Chef, which premiered on the channel. On 1 May 2022, Duronto TV's nineteenth season debuted, with the premiere of two new drama series, Dui e Dui e Char and Elating Belating, and Nickelodeon animated series Paw Patrol. Duronto TV won the Best TV Program (Kids) award at the Bangladesh Media Innovation Awards 2022 held in September 2022. The twenty-first season of Duronto TV debuted on 30 October, with the premiere of shows such as Mojar Kando Taekwondo, Dadur Jadoo, and The Smurfs. The channel premiered its first original animated series titled Kutu Bhutu on 3 November 2023.

Duronto TV introduced three new animated series, Cleo & Cuquin, Polinópolis, and PINY: Institute of New York, as part of its thirtieth season that premiered on 26 January 2025. On 27 April, Duronto TV premiered its thirty-first season, in which animated series Coconut the Little Dragon, Grisu, and Q Pootle 5 began airing. Its thirty-second season began airing on 27 July, which included new animated series such as Ziggy and the Zootram and School of Roars, as well as a new game show titled Duronto Family. Later on 26 October, the channel introduced five new series as part of its thirty-third season. These include four animated series, Lexi & Lottie: Trusty Twin Detectives, Space Nova, Knight Rusty, and Four and a Half Friends, as well as a quiz show titled Bolo To Dekhi.

=== FR Tower fire and temporary closure ===
As a result of a fire breaking out at the FR Tower in Banani, Dhaka, Duronto TV, along with the unrelated radio station Radio Today, were both temporarily taken off the air on 28 March 2019. Both later resumed transmissions over time.

== Programming ==
Duronto TV's programming mainly consists of shows relating to drama, historical, cultural, travel, magic, science, sports, family, and others. Alongside local programming, which is mostly live action, the channel's lineup also features acquired foreign television series and films, mainly Hollywood and animated, dubbed in Bengali, such as SpongeBob SquarePants, Despicable Me 2, and others. It also airs special programs during certain occasions, such as the cooking show, Banai Iftar Ma-Baba Ar Ami, and quiz show regarding Islam, Janar Ache Onek Kichu, both being aired during the holy month of Ramadan. It broadcasts the national anthem of Bangladesh, Amar Shonar Bangla, everyday during mornings, before moving onto its regular schedule.

=== Original programming ===
- Adbhut - The mission of a couple of children with built-in magical powers to defeat a magician who captivates the residents of Abhaynagar.
- Ba-te Bondhu - About the friendship of two brothers, Bony and Bunty, their neighbour, Bubly, and their parents.
- Banan Maane Spelling - A spelling bee series.
- Bhulostein - With its name being a pun of Albert Einstein, the series circulates around 'Bhulostein' and his assistant "Piku" telling scientific stories and doing experiments.
- Bhuter Baksho - A horror series.
- Cholo Jai Jai Jai - A series about the visits of Bangladeshi families at diverse places in the country.
- Chutir Dine - What a group of children and their grandfather do at holiday.
- Dui e Dui e Char - family comedy series
- Duronto Cricket - series about the sport of cricket.
- Duronto Somoy - exploration of the importance of consuming healthy food and exercising
- Dushtu Mishti
- Elating Belating - family drama show
- Golpo Sheshe Ghumer Deshe
- Hablu Gablu - A comedy television series about two brothers who are adults yet childish, along with their pet Pakhi Bondhu.
- Hoi Hoi Holla -
- Icchedana - Portrays the lives of girls in Bangladesh.
- Janar Ache Onek Kichu - Only broadcast during Ramadan, it is a quiz show regarding Islam, the predominant religion in Bangladesh.
- Kabil Kohkafi
- Kattush Kuttush - Regarding two book worms that literally eat book pages.
- Khatta Mitha - A puppetry television series involving two friends who live in the same locality.
- Khoka Theke Bangabandhu - Circulating around the life of Bangladesh's founding father, Sheikh Mujibur Rahman.
- Kutu Bhutu - The first original animated series of Duronto TV, revolving around the comic fights of a dog and squirrel duo, similar to Tom and Jerry.
- Laal Kohinoor
- Maa Babai Sera
- Mastermind Family Bangladesh - The Bangladeshi adaptation of Mastermind produced by BBC.
- Naacher Ishkool
- Panchabhuj
- Rong Beronger Golpo
- Shohor Theke Dure
- Shonar Kathi Rupar Kathi
- Shopno Akar Dol
- Surer Bhela
- The English Club - Helps children to learn the English language.
- Tirigiri Tokka - An alien by the name of 'Tirigiri Tokka' appears in front of a girl named Shurjomukhi, and wants to protectthe Earth from pollution and further destruction.

=== Acquired programming ===
==== Live-action ====
- The Art Room
- Sisimpur
- Splatalot!

==== Animated ====
- Alisa Knows What to Do!
- Babar and the Adventures of Badou
- Balloopo
- Blaze and the Monster Machines
- Bob the Builder
- Bobby and Bill
- Bubble Guppies
- Chaplin & Co
- Chronokids
- Clay Kids
- Cleo & Cuquin
- Coconut the Little Dragon
- Conni
- Crafty Kids Club
- Dora the Explorer
- Dragon Hunters
- Eddy and the Bear
- Eena Meena Deeka
- Ella Bella Bingo
- Florrie's Dragons
- Four and a Half Friends
- Franklin and Friends
- Grisu
- Guess What?
- Hareport
- Heidi
- Justin Time
- Kate & Mim-Mim
- Knight Rusty
- Kung Fu Panda: Legends of Awesomeness
- Lassie
- Lexi & Lottie: Trusty Twin Detectives
- Little Charmers
- Little Monsters
- Lucas & Emily
- Maya the Bee
- Messy Goes to OKIDO
- Mini Ninjas
- Mia and me
- Minuscule
- Nella the Princess Knight
- Ozie Boo!
- Paw Patrol
- PINY: Institute of New York
- Polinópolis
- Pororo the Little Penguin
- Q Pootle 5
- Rainbow Ruby
- Rolie Polie Olie
- Rusty Rivets
- School of Roars
- Space Nova
- Spike Team
- SpongeBob SquarePants
- Teenage Mutant Ninja Turtles
- The Adventures of Tintin
- The Backyardigans
- The Care Bears Family
- The Garfield Show
- The Happets
- The Jungle Book
- The Magic Roundabout
- The Minimighty Kids
- The Penguins of Madagascar
- The Ugly Duckling and Me!
- Tip the Mouse
- Top Wing
- Tree Fu Tom
- Wissper
- WordGirl
- Zigby
- Ziggy and the Zootram
