= Debra McGrath =

Canadian actress

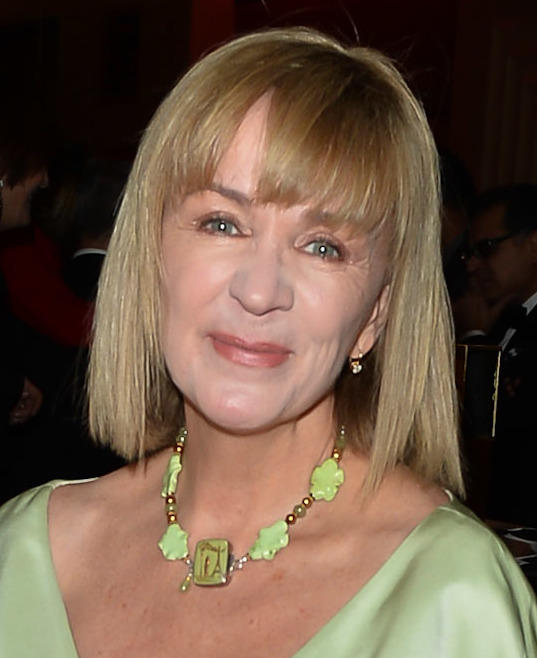
- McGrath at the 2014 Music & Movies: CFC Gala & Auction Fundraiser
- Born: Toronto, Ontario, Canada
- Education: Ryerson Polytechnical Institute (now Toronto Metropolitan University)
- Occupations: Actress; comedian
- Years active: 1980–present
- Notable work: Little Mosque on the Prairie
- Spouses: Dana Andersen (m. 1983–1986); Colin Mochrie (m. 1989)
- Children: 1
- Relatives: Munro Chambers (nephew)

Debra McGrath is a Canadian actress and comedian.

== Early life ==
McGrath was born in Toronto to Anne (née Munro) and James McGrath Jr. She studied theatre at Ryerson Polytechnical Institute (now Toronto Metropolitan University).

== Career ==
McGrath first started her career with three years as a member of The Second City in Toronto, Ontario, from 1983 to 1985, where she was a writer and actress, and eventually a director. She was best known for a take-off of Marilyn Monroe, and the song Condoms are a Girl's Best Friend. During the late 1980s, she appeared with Second City at anniversary, comedy festival and Club Soda performances.

In 1987, McGrath starred in Spoof, a comedy pilot written by Brian Cooke and Perry Rosemond. In 1989, she had a major role in Allan King's film Termini Station. She also appeared in Eugene Levy's 1992 TV film Partners 'N Love, in which she played a lawyer whose client's divorce was found to be invalid.

In 1990, with Linda Kash, McGrath co-created My Talk Show, a sitcom featuring a talk show broadcast from the host's basement. The series ran for one year, with fifty-nine episodes. Producer Bob Tischler cast Cynthia Stevenson as the host, while McGrath played a local dinner theatre owner, actress and head of the Chamber of Commerce. Initial reviews were very positive, predicting that McGrath would become the Carl Reiner of the 1990s. However, ratings were low, the host character left the show and McGrath's character became the host. Ratings did not improve (one reviewer considered that McGrath's character was "a grating, overbearing bimbo whose I-have-no-idea-who-my-guests-are routine gets boring fast") and the show folded after one season. McGrath was also a co-writer of the Canadian Women's Television Network's Go Girl!, a send-up of a cable TV talk show that debuted in 1997.

In 2002, McGrath appeared in the film Expecting, directed by Deborah Day, which won Most Popular Canadian Film at the 2002 Vancouver International Film Festival. McGrath played a dermatologist, the childless older sister of the pregnant star, and her performance was noted by several reviewers as "show[ing] the wounded heart beneath the careerist's brittle exterior"; "McGrath is the other standout as Anita, by far the richest character in the film. Neurotic and condescending to everyone around her, Anita is quick to deliver zingers, then filled with regret for what she's said. McGrath is sharp and touching, surprisingly substantial in a film that's ultimately fluff." For this role, McGrath won the award for Best Performance in a Feature (Female) at the 2004 Canadian Comedy Awards.

Alongside Paul O'Sullivan, Rebecca Northan, Lisa Merchant and Peter Oldring, she received a Gemini Award nomination for Ensemble Performance in a Comedy Program or Series at the 19th Gemini Awards in 2004 for The Joe Blow Show.

With her husband, Colin Mochrie, and Deborah Day, McGrath co-created and starred in the CBC television series Getting Along Famously (2006), about a fictional couple who star in a 1960s TV variety show. The 2005 pilot show of Getting Along Famously was nominated for two Gemini Awards, including Best Writing in a Comedy or Variety Program or Series. She also starred in the children's series Seven Little Monsters (2000–2003), and in Little Mosque on the Prairie (2007–2012) in which she played Mayor Popowitcz. She co-starred with Spencer Rice in Single White Spenny in 2011.

In 2003, she formed a comedy troupe called Women Fully Clothed with four other Canadian comedy artists. Fellow cast members Kathy Greenwood, Robin Duke, Jayne Eastwood, Teresa Pavlinek and McGrath perform sketches about situations ordinary women face every day. One reviewer considered that "Although all five comedians have performance skills in spades, Kathryn Greenwood and Debra McGrath are standouts, ... the latter for her dancing skills. ... McGrath cuts a mean rug in her tap shoes, and her monologue in the routine about being on the phone with her mum and granny hit very close to the bone." McGrath left the troupe in the first half of 2009.

McGrath played Cornelia in the 2003 live-action films Eloise at the Plaza and Eloise at Christmastime. She has made numerous guest appearances on a variety of Canadian TV series and had a regular role in seasons one (2001) and two (2004) of Paradise Falls. She has also voiced characters in many other animated shows, including The Raccoons (1991), The Busy World of Richard Scarry (1993–1997), Stories From My Childhood (1998), George and Martha (Valerie Chuckles, 1999–2000), Babar (2000), George Shrinks (Mrs. Lopez, 2000–2001), Franklin and the Green Knight (2000) and Peep and the Big Wide World (2005–2007).

== Personal life ==
McGrath was formerly married to Dana Andersen. She married fellow comedian and Second City alumnus Colin Mochrie in 1989. They live in Leaside, Toronto. They have one child, a daughter, Kinley Mochrie. McGrath collects 1950s Italian Murano glass.

McGrath is related to Canadian actor Munro Chambers, as is her husband Mochrie by marriage. In a 2010 interview, Chambers stated:

"I could say many things... my uncle, for one thing, is Colin Mochrie. He's been my inspiration getting into the industry. He's my uncle-in-law; his wife is my dad's cousin. My dad and his cousin, they were kind of like brother and sister growing up, so he’s my uncle by law. We have a good relationship."

== Filmography ==
Film
Year	Title	Role	Notes
1985	One Magic Christmas	Mrs. Noonan	
1989	Termini Station	Liz Dunshane	
1997	The Real Blonde	Cis	
2000	Franklin and the Green Knight: The Movie	Warbler	Direct-to-video; Voice; Credited as Deb McGrath
2002	Expecting	Anita	Writer - Dialogue
2005	Burnt Toast: The Argument	Wife	Video short
2013	The Shaw Festival: Behind the Curtain	Narrator	Voice; Documentary; Credited as Deb McGrath
2013	Stag	Biker Gail	
2016	Duty Calls	Drunk	Short film
2019	Home in Time	Fran	Short film
2019	Majic	Truckspoor	
2022	Junior's Giant	Dale	Short film; also writer and producer
2025	Magnetosphere	Ms. Deering	

Television
Year	Title	Role	Notes
1980	Bizarre	Various characters	
1983	SCTV Channel	McConnachie	Season 6 episode 1: "Maudlin O' the Night"
1987	Really Weird Tales	Mother	TV movie Segment: "I'll Be Loving"
1988	110 Lombard		TV short
1989–1993	Street Legal	Julia McCrindle / Real Estate Agent	2 episodes
1990	My Talk Show	Anne Marie Snelling	Episode: "Uptown Anne Marie"; Writer - 6 episodes
1991	The Raccoons	Nurse Peck	Voice; Season 5 episode 2: "Stress Test!"
1992	Partners 'n Love	Rosemary Hudson	TV movie
1993–1997	The Busy World of Richard Scarry		Voice; 36 episodes
1994	RoboCop	Bambi Taker	Episode 3: "Prime Suspect"
1994	Due South	Tammy Markles	Season 1 episode 5: "Pizzas and Promises"
1998	Stories from My Childhood		Credited as Debbie McGrath; Episode 12: "The Prince and the Swan"
1997–1999	Wind at My Back	Reenie Bigelow	3 episodes
1998–1999	Ned's Newt	Mrs. Pluck / Agent Spam / Lion 2	Voice; 5 episodes Credited as Deb McGrath
1999–2000	George and Martha	Valerie Chuckles	Voice; Main role (26 episodes)
2000	Code Name: Eternity	Nurse	Episode 1: "Ethaniel's Story"
2000	Babar	Additional Voices	Voice; 13 episodes
2000–2001	George Shrinks	Mrs. Lopez	Voice; 3 episodes
2000–2003	Seven Little Monsters	Mama	Voice; Main role (49 episodes)
2001–2004	Paradise Falls	Shirley Armstrong / Shirley	25 episodes
2002	Moville Mysteries	Female Agent	Voice; Season 1 episode 4: "How Green Was My Lunch Meat"
2003	DC 9/11: Time of Crisis	Mary Matalin	TV movie
2003	Eloise at Christmastime	Cornelia	TV movie
2003	The Joe Blow Show		
2005	Getting Along Famously	Ruby Kendall	TV movie pilot Teleplay writer Executive producer
2005	Burnt Toast	Ursula	TV movie
2005–2007	Peep and the Big Wide World	Beaver Mom	Voice; 5 episodes
2006	This Is Wonderland	Marty Klein	Episode #3.9
2006	Getting Along Famously	Ruby Kendall	Main role Co-creator; Writer; Executive producer
2007	The Jane Show	Sally	Season 2 episode 14: "Who's Got Spirit?"
2007	Women Fully Clothed: All Dressed Up and Places to Go	Herself	TV documentary
2007–2012	Little Mosque on the Prairie	Mayor Ann Popowicz	Main role (90 episodes and one special)
2009–2010	Winnipeg Comedy Festival	Herself	Host - Season 7 episode 1: "Tying the Knot"; Season 8 episode 4: "The Holiday Show" - Credited as Deb McGrath; Writer (2 episodes)
2009–2013	The Ron James Show	Ted's Wife	8 episodes
2010	Love Letters	Melissa	TV short
2010	Winnipeg Comedy Festival	Herself	TV documentary
2011	Single White Spenny	Sheila	Main role
2011	The Casting Room	Herself	Season 2 episode 4: "Debra McGrath"
2012	Sunshine Sketches of a Little Town	Mrs. Pepperleigh	TV movie
2016	Coming In	Mitchell's Mom	2 episodes
2018	Let's Get Physical	Kathy Vanslooten	Credited as Deb McGrath; Episode 8: "CAC Fight!"
2019	Private Eyes	Deena Duncan	Season 3 episode 12: "Glazed and Confused"
2019	Carter	Gretchen Jacott	Season 2 episode 1: "Harley Wears A Wig"
2020	Baroness von Sketch Show	Roberta	Episode: "All I'm Saying Is Her Car Has Eyelashes"

Video games
Year	Title	Role	Notes
2018	Far Cry 5	Nancy	Voice
