= John Stocker (voice actor) =

Canadian voice actor

- Born: Toronto, Ontario, Canada
- Occupation: Voice actor
- Years active: 1967–present
- Children: 1

John Stocker is a Canadian voice actor. His career in voice acting began in the 1970s.

== Life and career ==
In 1973, he joined a comedy troupe called the Zoo Factory, whose members consisted of Dan Hennessey, Bruce Gordon, Harriet Cohen and Jerelyn Craden.

On television, Stocker played the voice of Beastly, the clumsy and frantic, but smart villain on the Nelvana version of the Care Bears television series The Care Bears Family. He also voiced The Rat King in the series finale Care Bears Nutcracker Suite. He and Hennessey appeared as Thomson and Thompson on The Adventures of Tintin.

In the film industry, he voiced the Cheshire Cat, as well as The Wizard's assistant Dim, in 1987's The Care Bears Adventure in Wonderland, and he played a character named Sol in 1993's Look Who's Talking Now.

He was also the voice director on Beyblade, Medabots, Committed, Pandalian, Sailor Moon, Caillou, The Amazing Spiez!, Animated Tales of the World, Rob the Robot, Totally Spies!, Totally Spies! The Movie, Plop!, Mona the Vampire, Martin Mystery, What It's Like Being Alone, The Goal, Zeroman, Strawberry Cafe, Monster Buster Club, Chuck and Friends, Papaya Bull, The Magic Hockey Skates, Zac and Penny, Fugget About It, RedaKai: Conquer the Kairu, Ella the Elephant, The Busy World of Richard Scarry, Flack, Ky Staxx, The Mulligans, Di-Gata Defenders, Mike the Knight, Dr. Dimensionpants, Timoon and the Narwhal, Nightfall, Tripping the Rift and Microfriends.

Stocker is one of the few voice actors to appear in all three of the Super Mario Bros. animated series, with one of the characters that he had voiced being Toad. He has also done voices for many video games including Jagged Alliance 2, Naruto, Hype: The Time Quest, Spawn: In the Demon's Hand, Splinter Cell: Chaos Theory, Jagged Alliance 2: Unfinished Business and Silent Storm as well as voice directing Beyblade: Super Tournament Battle, Medabots Infinity, Sentinel: Descendants in Time, and Magna Carta: Tears of Blood.

== Personal life ==
Stocker is Jewish. He has a daughter named Bailey, who is also an actress.

== Filmography ==
=== Film and television ===
- Let's Go Luna! (Barry)
- Corn & Peg (Lulu's Grandpa)
- Ewoks (Dulok Scout/Hoom/Widdle)
- Star Wars: Droids (Vlix)
- Today's Special (CLUMP/Crandall J. Crummington III)
- My Pet Monster
- Alf Tales
- Babar (Basil/Zephir)
- The Adventures of Tintin (Thompson)
- Jayce and the Wheeled Warriors (Gun Grinner)
- Super Mario Bros. (Toad, Koopa Troopa, Beezo, Mouser, Flurry, Oogtar)
- Mona the Vampire (Mayor Rosenbaum)
- Stunt Dawgs (Fungus)
- Dog City (Bugsy)
- Go, Dog. Go! (Leo Howlstead)
- Dinosaucers (Ankylo/Terrible Dactyl)
- Maxie's World (Mr. Garcia)
- X-Men: The Animated Series (Graydon Creed, Leech)
- Moville Mysteries (Mr. Silver)
- Little Bear
- C.O.P.S. (Sergeant PJ "Longarm" O'Malley)
- Life with Judy Garland: Me and My Shadows (George Cukor)
- Cyberchase (Father Time)
- B.C.: A Special Christmas (Curls)
- Color of Justice (Court Clerk)
- The Kidnapping of the President (Herman)
- Bookmice (Narrator)
- The Christmas Tree
- The Legend of the Christmas Tree (Lotor)
- Barbie and the Rockers: Out of this World
- Barbie and The Sensations: Rockin' Back to Earth
- Madballs (Aargh, Skull Face)
- Belphegor (Menardier)
- Jacob Two-Two (Zaidy Sol/Sgt. Order)
- Adventures of Sonic the Hedgehog
- The Jar
- The Adventures of Teddy Ruxpin (Newton Gimmick)
- The Wizard of Oz (The Tin Woodman)
- Blazing Dragons (Evil Knight 2/Sir Burnevere)
- Hammerman (Defacely Mallmeister)
- Look Who's Talking Now (Sol)
- Roboroach (Toady, Skeeter Jennings)
- Mischief City (Mr. Cube)
- Grossology
- The Care Bears Family (Beastly)
- The Care Bears Adventure in Wonderland (Dim, Cheshire Cat)
- Care Bears Nutcracker Suite (The Rat King)
- Finders Keepers (UBS Editor)
- JoJo's Circus (Federico Froggina)
- Miss Spider's Sunny Patch Friends (Rocky)
- Garbage Pail Kids
- Ned's Newt
- Franklin
- Maggie and the Ferocious Beast
- Ratz
- The Eggs
- Billy and Buddy
- Flight Squad
- Music Machine (Zoo Factory Member)
- Mini-Man (Agent Piti/Ant King)
- Kaput & Zösky (Marvin the Enchanter, The Great Ghandizen, Bobo Bibola)
- Zoé Kezako (The Park Keeper)
- The Secret World of Benjamin Bear (Edgar)
- Ivanhoe
- The Incredible Crash Dummies (Dr. Zub/Horst)
- The Red Green Show (Commercial Actor)
- Joy (George Miller)
- Check It Out! (Morty)
- Ultraforce (Stanley Leeland)
- Get Ed
- Diabolik
- Night Hood
- Bedtime Primetime Classics
- Birdz
- Sagwa, the Chinese Siamese Cat
- Bob and Margaret
- The Little Lulu Show
- Rotten Ralph (Station Manager)
- Kitou
- My Life Me
- Bronco Teddy
- Moville Mysteries
- The Magic School Bus
- Flash Gordon
- The Boy
- Monster Buster Club (Bill Beattie)
- The Secret World of Santa Claus
- Winx Club
- Funpak
- Men (Delver)
- Bakugan Battle Brawlers (Naga/Nova Lion/King Zenohold)
- Braceface
- What's with Andy?
- Pearlie
- Freaky Stories
- Daft Planet
- Atomic Betty
- Corduroy
- George and Martha
- Elliot Moose
- Tupu
- Iron Nose
- Pirate Family
- Kid Paddle
- Patrol 03
- Rescue Heroes
- Way Out There
- ALF: The Animated Series
- Martin Mystery
- Medabots
- Mega Babies
- Flat!
- The Adventures of Sam & Max: Freelance Police
- Ali Baba
- The Tradition of the Christmas Log
- Monster Allergy
- The Kids from Room 402
- The Accuser
- The Ripping Friends
- Journey to the West: The Legend of the Monkey Kings
- Traffix
- George Shrinks
- Erky Perky
- Odd Job Jack
- Delilah and Julius
- Captain Mack
- Bob and Doug
- Turbo Dogs
- Spider Riders
- Toot and Puddle
- Busytown Mysteries
- Team S.O.S.
- Edward
- The Manly Bee
- My Friend Rabbit
- Pigly
- The Amazing Spiez!
- Iggy Arbuckle
- Malo Korrigan
- Silver Surfer
- The Triplets
- The Tofus
- The Mulligans
- The Berenstain Bears
- Pecola
- Peep and the Big Wide World
- Creepschool
- Delta State
- The Ripping Friends
- Little Rosey
- The Rosey and Buddy Show
- Hello Kitty and Friends
- Timothy Goes to School
- Police Academy
- Kit and Kaboodle
- Power Stone
- Slam Dunk
- Gene Fusion
- Monster by Mistake
- Liberty's Kids
- Oscar and Spike
- Spaced Out
- King
- Milo
- Metajets
- What It's Like Being Alone
- Anne of Green Gables: The Animated Series
- Children of Chelm
- X-DuckX
- Blaster's Universe
- Simon in the Land of Chalk Drawings
- Woofy
- Magi-Nation
- Interlude
- Wombat City
- Pig City
- Kevin Spencer
- Prudence Gumshoe
- The Adventures of Princess Sydney
- Wushu Warrior
- 6teen
- Plop!
- Bratz
- Spliced
- Boom Unit
- Giggle Factory
- Snailympics
- Undergrads
- Wayside
- 3 Gold Coins
- Punch
- The Mysteries of Alfred Hedgehog
- Uncle Joe's Cartoon Playhouse
- The Triplets of Belleville
- Untalkative Bunny
- Fishtronaut
- Henry's World
- Mama Mirabelle's Home Movies
- Harry and His Bucket Full of Dinosaurs
- The Return of Ben Casey
- Lola and Virginia
- Jane and the Dragon
- The Ripping Friends
- Miss BG
- Super Why!
- The Future Is Wild
- Mati and Dada
- Okura
- Gerald McBoing-Boing
- Chilly Beach
- Wilbur
- The Seventh Portal
- X-Chromosome
- The Wumblers
- Butch Patterson: Private Dick
- Bimbo
- Yakari
- Life on the Block
- Pipi, Pupu and Rosemary
- Shaolin Kids
- Willa's Wild Life
- Legends of the Land
- The New Archies
- Growing Up Creepie
- Ruby Gloom
- Yin Yang Yo!
- Tommy and Oscar
- Captain Flamingo
- Franny's Feet
- Gino the Chicken
- Yam Roll
- Keroppi
- Seven Little Monsters
- Seeing Things
- The Soulmates in The Gift of Light (Truman, Driver, Doubting Thomas)
- Arthur (William Carlos Williams)
- Highlander: The Animated Series
- Nunavut
- Pet Pals
- Dr. Zonk and the Zunkins
- Fight for Life
- Stories from My Childhood
- Animal Crackers
- Ripley's Believe It or Not
- Quads!
- For Better or For Worse
- Marvin the Tap-Dancing Horse
- Caillou
- Dragon Hunters
- Gnou
- Fred's Head
- The Magic Hockey Skates
- Value Tales
- Sailor Moon (Grandpa Hino/Mr. Magic Pierrot/Biribiri)
- Knights of Zodiac
- Dumb Bunnies
- Bizby
- Zeroman
- Scaredy Squirrel
- World of Quest
- Walter
- Coolman
- Moot Moot
- This Just In!
- Gofrette
- The Country Mouse and the City Mouse Adventures
- Delilah and Julius
- The Big Hit (Sid Mussberger)
- SCTV (Narrator-Staff Announcer)
- The Dating Guy (TV Anchor)
- Katts and Dog
- Franklin and Friends (Mr. Owl)
- Piggsburg Pigs! (Huff)
- Inuk
- Di-Gata Defenders
- Fred the Caveman
- Clifford's Fun with...
- Mike the Knight
- Monster Force
- Anne of Green Gables: The Movie
- The Dream Team (Murray)
- Beyblade (Max's Father)
- Kassai and Leuk (Togum)
- The New Adventures of Lucky Luke (Various characters including General Custer and Joe Dalton)
- Ocean Tales (Walrus, Basil)
- Sylvanian Families (Grandpa Smoky Wildwood/Gatorpossum)
- King of Kensington (Paul)
- Strange Days at Blake Holsey High (The Furnace)
- Madeline (Vendor)
- Tripping the Rift
- Tripping the Rift: The Movie
- Wunschpunsch
- My Dad the Rock Star
- My Goldfish Is Evil!
- Artopia
- Time Warp Trio (Kai's Uncle/Brawny Accomplice)
- Mia and Me (Polytheus)
- Rupert
- Mythic Warriors: Guardians of the Legend (Zetes, Polemius, 2nd Soldier/2nd Guard)
- Redwall (Brother Alf/Cheese Thief/Clogg)
- Totally Spies! (Seth/Bedhead)
- Totally Spies! The Movie
- Avengers: United They Stand (Ultron)
- Tom and Vicky (Grandad)
- Hangin' In (Fat Voice)
- Faireez (Higgledy)
- Bad Dog (Grandpa)
- Carl Squared (Doc Wilson)
- Mica (Gabbro)
- Hot Shots (Cromwell)
- Dex Hamilton: Alien Entomologist (Regis Stone)
- Dex Hamilton: Fire and Ice (Baxter)
- Exhibit A: Secrets of Forensic Science (Pavel Klimko)
- Concrete Angels (Mr. Stock)
- Metastax
- Spike Christmas
- The Three Pigs
- Hippo Tub Company
- Something from Nothing (Papa Mouse/Papa/Itzik/Teacher)
- Hoze Houndz
- Meet Julie
- Little Shop
- Pippi Longstocking
- Ace Ventura: Pet Detective
- Pelswick
- Dog's World
- Ella the Elephant
- Chuck and Friends
- Flying Rhino Junior High
- Free Willy
- Anatole (Pamplemousse)
- The Busy World of Richard Scarry (Father Cat/Mr. Humperdink/Scotty Dog/Pedro/Wolfgang Wolf)
- Donkey Kong Country (Kutlass)
- The Neverending Story (Gluckuck)
- Beetlejuice (Mr. Monitor/Bartholomew Batt)
- Starcom: The U.S. Space Force
- Rob the Robot (Mission Control)
- Cadillacs and Dinosaurs (Dr. Fessenden)
- Coming Up Rosie (Dwayne Kramer)
- The Real Ghostbusters (Stay Puft Marshmallow Man)
- Turtle Island
- Sidekick (Mayor Swifty)
- Tales from the Cryptkeeper (Melvin, Various Monsters)
- Friends and Heroes (Nathan)
- Higglytown Heroes (Nacho Brother Nick/Additional Voices)

=== Video games ===
- Bakugan Battle Brawlers (Naga)
- Spawn: In the Demon's Hand (Clown)

=== Web ===
- "President Peach's Beautiful Border Wall" (Toad)
