= Rebecca Northan =

Canadian actress

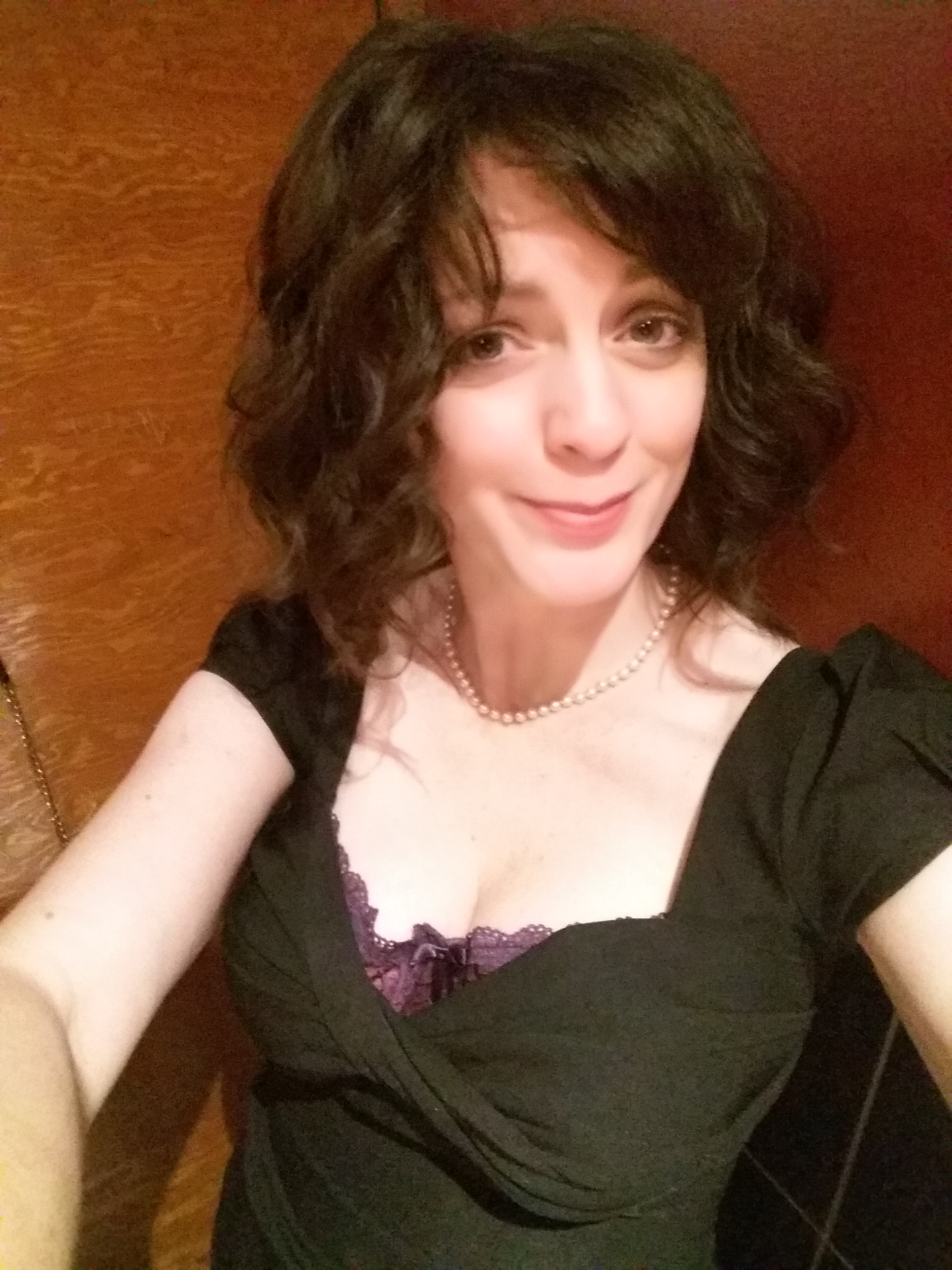
- Born: Calgary, Alberta, Canada
- Occupations: Actress, improviser, theatre director, creative artist

Rebecca Northan is a Canadian actor, improviser, theatre director, and creative artist. She is known for playing the hippie mother Diane Macleod on the CTV & The Comedy Network sitcom Alice, I Think and for her role as Jane in the independent film Adult Adoption. She is a graduate of the University of Calgary, and an alumna of the Loose Moose Theatre Company where she did her improv training with Keith Johnstone.

Northan has been improvising and working as an actor for many years, and in 2004 she was nominated for a Gemini Award for "Best Ensemble in a Comedy" for The Comedy Network’s The Joe Blow Show. Northan is also a five-time Canadian Comedy Award nominee, and one time winner, for "Best Female Improviser". She has made several appearances at the Montreal Just For Laughs Comedy Festival in the World Improv Games, and was a member of The Second City Toronto mainstage cast. She has also appeared as a guest host on CBC's This Hour Has 22 Minutes, as well as having appeared in the feature films The Rocker and Mr. Magorium's Wonder Emporium. She also co-stars in the Showcase series The Foundation, directed by Michael Dowse.

As a theatre actor, Northan has worked across Canada including Theatre Calgary, Manitoba Theatre Centre, Fringe Theatre Adventures (Edmonton), Quest Theatre (touring theatre for young people) and Alberta Theatre Projects. In Toronto, Northan was nominated for a Dora Mavor Moore Award for "Best Actress" for her work in Eric Woolfe's Jack the Ripper play, Dear Boss. When not performing Northan also works as producer/director.

Northan was briefly married to Canadian actor Bruce Horak. The two continue to work as creative partners, and together, have created a number of award-winning projects. Northan and Horak collaborated on the live theatrical show This is Cancer!, a comedy which brings the character of Cancer to life in order to address the modern audience's current cancer concerns. They are also responsible for Legend Has It, Undercover, and An Undiscovered Shakespeare - all productions which fall under the banner of Spontaneous Theatre, a theatrical genre pioneered by Northan, which casts an audience member in the lead role.

In the summer of 2007, Northan created a performance piece for the Harbourfront Centre's Spiegelshow Blind Date, an improvised turn in which Northan chooses a member of the audience to perform with her as her blind date. This subsequently evolved into a 90 minute performance that initially played at both the Loose Moose Theatre, and the World Stage Series at Harbourfront Centre in Toronto, to sold out crowds. In December 2010, the show was picked up by Broadway Producer Kevin McCollum. It sold out its run at Ars Nova in NYC, and was met with rave reviews.

In the spring of 2013 McCollum brought Blind Date to the Charing Cross Theatre in London, UK for seven weeks.

In 2016, she won the Dora Mavor Moore Award for Outstanding Performance by a Female in a Principal Role – Play (Large Theatre) for Blind Date. As of 2021, Blind Date has had just over 900 performances. Queer Blind Date developed in partnership with Buddies in Bad Times Theatre, in Toronto, and a Norwegian version has been licensed to the improv company Det Andre Teatret in Oslo.

Alongside Paul O'Sullivan, Debra McGrath, Lisa Merchant and Peter Oldring, she received a Gemini Award nomination for Ensemble Performance in a Comedy Program or Series at the 19th Gemini Awards in 2004 for The Joe Blow Show.
