= Good Morning World =

Good Morning World may refer to:

- Good Morning World (American TV series) (1967–1968)
- Good Morning World (Canadian TV series) (2007)
