= Lisa Merchant =

Canadian comic improviser and actress

Lisa Merchant is a Canadian comic improviser and actress. She played Brenda Murphy on Train 48, and appeared on Improv Heaven and Hell. She has won three Canadian Comedy Awards for Best Female Improviser (in 2001, 2003 & 2005).

Alongside Paul O'Sullivan, Debra McGrath, Rebecca Northan and Peter Oldring, she received a Gemini Award nomination for Ensemble Performance in a Comedy Program or Series at the 19th Gemini Awards in 2004 for The Joe Blow Show.
