= Annick Obonsawin =

Canadian actress

- Born: Toronto, Ontario, Canada
- Occupation: Actress
- Years active: 1993–present

Annick Obonsawin is a Canadian actress.

== Career ==
Obonsawin has played roles in many children's shows such as Inez in Cyberchase and Skunk in Franklin. She also played Slappy the Dummy in Goosebumps, and Sierra in Total Drama. She voiced Jamie, Johnny, and Jimmy's sister, in the 2014 animated film The Nut Job; Belinda in the Disney Jr./TVOKids animated TV series Ella the Elephant; and Startail in Starlink: Battle for Atlas. She also voices Hilda from George Shrinks.

== Personal life ==
A First Nations woman, she is of Abenaki heritage.

== Filmography ==
=== Film ===
Year	Film	Role	Notes
1995	It Takes Two	Brenda Butkis	
1996	Swiss Family Robinson		Voice
1997	Silence	Mary	
1997	Pippi Longstocking	Kids	Voices
1999	Touched	Dixie	
2000	Franklin and the Green Knight	Armadillo	Voice
2002	Madeline: My Fair Madeline	Emma	Voice
2003	Back to School with Franklin	Skunk	Voice
2007	Charlie Bartlett	Daisy	
2010	Barbie: A Fashion Fairytale	Jilliana	Voice
2014	The Nut Job	Jamie	Voice

=== Television ===
Year	Film	Role	Episodes and notes
1993	The Adventures of Dudley the Dragon	Sophie	Season 1
1994	Squawk Box	Various	Main cast member
1995–1996	The Magic School Bus	Caller (voice)	2 episodes
1995–1996	The NeverEnding Story	Gaya, Edzel (voice)	2 episodes
1995–1997	Goosebumps	Slappy (voice), Sari Hassad	3 episodes
1995–2003	Little Bear	Pigeon (#3) ("A Flu"), Robin, Squirrel ("Little Bear and the North Pole") (voices)	Additional voices
1996–2000	The Adventures of Shirley Holmes	Alicia Gianelli	Main role, 36 episodes
1998	Anatole	Claudette (voice)	Recurring character, 5 episodes
1999–2001	Angela Anaconda	Karlene Trainor (voice)	Recurring character
1999	George and Martha	Walrus Kid (voice)	Episode: "A Day at the Beach"
1999	Ned's Newt	Mallow, Blonde-Haired Girl Who Lost Her Kite (voices)	Episodes: "Xylophone Camp" and "The Friendly Triangle"
1997–2004	Franklin	Skunk (voice)	Recurring character, 16 episodes
1998–1999	Brats of the Lost Nebula	Triply (voice)	Main role, 13 episodes
2001	Rescue Heroes	Jessica (voice)	Episode: "Canyon Catastrophe"
2001–2003	George Shrinks	Hilda Cooper, Hannah Cadwell (voices)	3 episodes
2001	Committed	Tracy Larsen (voice)	Main role, 13 episodes
2001–2004	Braceface	Tracy (voice)	Episode: "My Big Fat Braceface Life"
2002–present	Cyberchase	Inez (voice)	Main role
2003	Franny's Feet	Desta the Ostrich	Episode: "Egg Sitting"
2005	Mischief City	Maxine	Main role
2005–2006	Time Warp Trio	Anna (voice)	Recurring role
2006–2008	Captain Flamingo	Ruth-Ann (voice)	Recurring role
2006–2007	Erky Perky	Stinks (voice)	Supporting role, 18 episodes
2007–2008	Clang Invasion	Daisy Harrison (voice)	Main role
2008–2009	Bakugan Battle Brawlers	Daisy Makimoto (voice)	Episode: "Nightmare in Doomsville"
2009	Warehouse 13	Minnie Harris	Episode: "Pilot"
2009	Flashpoint	Rachel	Episode: "Never Let You Down"
2010–2013	Total Drama	Sierra (voice)	Main role
2011–2012	Bakugan: Mechtanium Surge	Paige (voice)	Main role
2012	The Cat in the Hat Knows a Lot About That!	Ralph (voice)	Special: "The Cat in the Hat Knows a Lot About Christmas!"
2013–2014	Ella the Elephant	Belinda (voice)	Main character
2015	Arthur	Angie Vanderloo (voice)	Episode: "Whip. Mix. Blend."
2017	3 Amigonauts	Herby (voice)	Main role
2017–2020	Top Wing	Matilda (voice)	Additional voices
2018–2020	Bakugan: Battle Planet	Mac, Max, Maid (voice)	
2020	Mighty Express	Peoplemover Penny (voice)	
2021	Bakugan: Geogan Rising	Mac, Max (voices)	Additional voices

=== Video games ===
Year	Title	Role	Notes
2018	Starlink: Battle for Atlas	Startail	
