= Friends and Heroes =

Canadian-British Christian children's television program

- Genre: Children's television series
- Created by: Brian D. Brown; Eric J. Danenberg
- Written by: Alan Burnett; Andrew Melrose; Brian D. Brown; Eric J. Danenberg; Joelle Sellner; Krista Tucker; Len Uhley; Michelle Lander; Paul Diamond; Robert Goodman; Stan Berkowitz
- Directed by: Dave Osborne
- Voices of: Austin Di lulio Sarah Gadon; Cedric Smith; Tony Daniels
- Theme music composer: Mark Topham
- Ending theme: "Looking for a Hero" by Lauren Waterworth
- Countries of origin: Canada; United Kingdom
- Original language: English
- No. of seasons: 3
- No. of episodes: 39

Production
- Executive producers: Alison Dorricott; David Dorricott
- Producers: Gary Kurtz (series 1); Naomi Jones (series 2 & 3)
- Running time: 25 minutes (per episode)

Original release
- Network: CBBC; TBN; Australian Christian Channel; Smile
- Release: 12 March 2007 – 3 July 2009

Friends and Heroes is an animated Christian children's television program that airs on TBN, Smile of a Child TV, and was also shown on BBC TV. It takes place from 69–71 AD, during the First Jewish–Roman War. There are three seasons or "series", each comprising 13 episodes: Season 1 is set in Alexandria, Egypt; Season 2 in Jerusalem and Season 3 in Rome. The series was created by Brian D. Brown and Eric J. Danenberg, who also worked on The Storykeepers. Gary Kurtz, the producer for season one, also produced American Graffiti, Star Wars, and The Empire Strikes Back. Starting with the second season, the show is produced in HD.

All three series have now been translated and dubbed into Arabic, Chinese (both Mandarin, and Taiwan Mandarin), French, German, Hindi, Korean, Brazilian Portuguese, Russian, and Latin American Spanish. The first season was also dubbed in Manx Gaelic, being the first animated series to be dubbed in said language.

The series was also broadcast on the Australian Christian Channel in Australia.

== Format overview ==
The show starts with a recap of last week's episode, relevant or not. Then the theme song plays. Act 1 begins with the name of the episode. There's usually about ten minutes of story and then a Bible story, followed by Act 2. There's more story and then another Bible story. Unless it is a two-part episode, the problem is resolved after the second Bible story. There are, however, three Bible stories in one episode.

== Story ==
=== Alexandria (AD 69) ===
The series begins in the year 69 AD, in Alexandria. There is a rebellion going on in nearby Judea by the Jews and Christians. In response, the governor, Tiberius orders his men, led by Brutacus and Tobias, to crack down on the Jews and Christians.

The first episode introduces the family of Samuel, Diana, their son Macky, and their rarely seen parrot, Pontius, who live in Delta Quarter on the port of Alexandria. They are rebels who hide other rebels in their house. Samuel's friend, a commander for the rebels in Judea, sends his daughters, Leah and Rebecca, to live with Samuel's family.

In episode two, Macky and Rebecca have an encounter with a girl named Portia while riding horses. After talking, they find out that she is the Governor's niece. She becomes fast friends with Samuel's family, but they never tell her that they are rebels.

Episode three introduces the characters of Miriam and Nathan, Samuel and Diana's friends, as well as fellow rebels. Their adopted African son, Sollie, is also introduced.

The entire first season is primarily a series of journeys, trying to protect rebels without the Governor or his cronies finding out. In the third-to-last episode, however, Tobias finds out the truth and they are all forced to flee Alexandria.

=== Jerusalem (AD 70) ===
Macky and Portia arrive in Jerusalem during the Roman siege. The people inside are starving, whilst the Romans grow desperate to break through the city walls.

Outside the city, Macky makes several key acquaintances. One is Isaac, who pretends to be senile most of the time, but is actually an active member of the rebel underground. His house, filled with hidden rooms and secret passages, is a safe house for the oppressed. Here Macky links up with the rebels (zealots) who live inside Jerusalem and soon becomes a courier between Jerusalem and the outside world.

Inside Jerusalem, Macky meets a girl, Sarah. Macky is drawn to Sarah's idealism, which puts a strain on his relationship with Portia. He also meets a Roman officer named Lucius, widowed father of two young children and secretly a Friend of Jesus – he was one of Paul's guards, many years earlier in Rome.

Macky learns to trust Lucius and he becomes a valued secret ally as Macky faces two old adversaries from Alexandria: Tobias and Brutacus. Towards the end of the siege, Macky takes greater risks, and is finally captured by the Romans.

Portia tries to intervene, but can't get him released. Instead she ensures that Macky is sent to Rome, her next destination, and his only hope.

=== Rome (AD 71) ===
Arriving in Rome, Macky finds himself in a gladiator school for the Circus Maximus, where the only rule is kill or be killed. Macky wants to do neither, so Portia intervenes with a Senator, Antonius, who takes Macky as a slave.

Macky discovers that Antonius is a secret Friend of Jesus and that at night, he dons a mask and goes out and rescues fellow Friends of Jesus from jail or helps them escape from slave-masters. Soon Macky in a disguise of his own starts helping the Senator.

Antonius has an enemy in the Senate named Marcus, who blames all the Empire's woes on the Friends of Jesus. Marcus would like to prove the notorious masked rebel is actually his enemy, Antonius, but Antonius is too clever for him. Marcus enlists the help of Tiberius, Brutacus, Tobias and Tobias' mother Luciana, an expert manipulator and political in-fighter with friends in high places.

Marcus begins to tighten his grip on Macky and Antonius, and Macky's and Portia's relationship deepens and matures through the difficult choices they have to make.

== Voice cast ==
=== Main ===
- Len Carlson (season 1) and Adam James (seasons 2–3) – Narrator.
- Austin Di Iulio – Macky, a fun-loving, God-loving rebel, who grew up in Alexandria and moved to Jerusalem and was taken captive to Rome. He knows the alleys and streets of Alexandria like the back of his hand. He'll do anything to help the rebels.
- Sarah Gadon – Portia, the witty, honest and kind niece of the governor of Alexandria and the best friend and love interest of Macky. Her father is in the military and her mother died when she was young, leading her to be under the care of Tiberius, her uncle.
- Cedric Smith – Tiberius, the governor of Alexandria.He hates the rebels and will do anything to stop them.
- Tony Daniels – Tobias, the foolish and gluttonous helper of Tiberius and life-long enemy of Macky. His enemies refer to him as "Toady".
- Howard Jerome – Brutacus, the foolish and loyal Roman soldier, who Tobias uses to help him with his schemes.
- Jamie Watson – Pontius, Macky's obnoxious pet bird.
- Benedict Campbell – Samuel, Macky's father and a silversmith, he is one of the rebels.
- Alyson Court – Diana, Macky's mother and a seamstress, who is at first against the idea of harboring refugees.
- Bailey Stocker – Rebecca, Leah's protective and clever older sister, who Macky considers his sister.
- Emma Pustil – Leah, Rebecca's fearless and curious younger sister, who Macky considers his sister.

=== Recurring ===
- A.J. Saudin – Sollie, Macky's neighbor and a close friend of his and a mechanical genius.
- Diane Fabian – Miriam, Sollie's adoptive mother.
- John Stocker – Nathan, Sollie's adoptive father.
- Aaryn Doyle – Flore, Lucius' eight year old daughter, who takes the job of being the woman of the house.
- Scott Beaudin – Anthony, Lucius's son and a friend of Macky's.
- John Ralston – Lucius/Elijah/Jonah
- Philip Akin – Isaac/John Ralston
- Martha MacIsaac – Sarah, a Zealot Macky's age and a close friend of his living in Jerusalem with a strong hatred for Romans.
- Alison Sealy-Smith – Devorah, Isaac's wife.
- Tim Hamaguchi – Abe
- Vanessa Thompson – Rachel, Isaac's daughter.
- Robert Bockstael – Senator Antonius/Masked Rebel.
- Elizabeth Hanna – Luciana
- Scott McCord – Dudemus
- Paul O'Sullivan – Marcus, Senator Antonius's rival and a hater of the friends of Jesus.He always tries to expose and blame Rome's woes on Antonius and the Friends of Jesus.
- Lyon Smith – Absolom, Macky's friend he made in the gladiator school.
- Jordan Todosey – Sophia, Senator Antonius's daughter and Felix's(her mute brother) translator.
- David Keeley – Amikam
- Juan Chioran – Peter/Pompano/2nd Judean Rebel/Fisherman #2
- Martin Roach – Jesus/God/1st Judean Rebel
- Robert Norman Smith – Aischros/2nd Guard/Judah/Pharaoh/King Xerxes
- Shauna MacDonald – Jezebel/Lydia/Naomi
- Lawrence Bayne – Caleb, a thief Macky's family mistook as a rebel. He later turned to good after realizing how kind Macky's family was.
- Stephen Bogaert – Aaron, a thief Macky's family mistook as a rebel.
- Tony Fleury – Courtier/Thomas
- Adrian Truss – Courtier 1+2/Joseph/Supervisor
- John Neville – Claxus
- Ruth Marshall – Delilah/Eza
- Mitchell Eisner – Caius
- Kristina Nicoll – Esther/Ruth
- Marty Moreau – Spy 2
- Ron Rubin – Soldier
- Olive French – King David
- Peter Oldring – Young David
- Larry Byrne – Ahab

== Episodes ==
=== Series overview ===
Series	Episodes	Originally released	
Series	Episodes	First released	Last released
1	13	12 March 2007	23 March 2007
2	13	17 March 2008	31 October 2008
3	13	12 December 2008	3 July 2009

=== Series 1 (2007) ===
No. overall	No. in series	Title	Directed by	Written by	Original release date	Prod. code
1	1	"Long Journey"	Dave Osborne	Story by : Brian D. Brown, Eric J. Danenberg; Teleplay by : Doug Atchison	12 March 2007	101
Macky and his family risk the wrath of the Romans by taking two refugee girls into their home.
2	2	"A Friend in High Places"	Dave Osborne	Eric J. Danenberg	12 March 2007	102
Macky rescues an aristocratic Roman girl, Portia. With help from Portia. Macky and the gang foil a money-making scheme run by the evil Tobias and Brutacus.
3	3	"Leviathan"	Dave Osborne	Story by : Eric J. Danenberg, Doug Atchison; Teleplay by : Doug Atchison, Robert N. Skir	13 March 2007	103
A giant warship docks in Alexandria harbour and Macky learns from Portia that the ship's mission is to attack the rebels resisting the Romans in Galilee. Macky inspires his friend, Sollie, to come up with a plan to sink the ship.
4	4	"False Heroes"	Dave Osborne	Story by : Michael Mayhew, Krista Tucker; Teleplay by : Krista Tucker, Paul Diamond	14 March 2007	104
Macky and the family take a risk and give shelter to two men they think are fugitive rebels.
5	5	"True Heroes"	Dave Osborne	Story by : Eric J. Danenberg, Brian D. Brown; Teleplay by : Ned Teitelbaum, Paul Diamond	14 March 2007	105
After intelligence reports of rebels entering the city by sea, Tiberius orders the famous lighthouse extinguished.
6	6	"Freedom Fighters"	Dave Osborne	Story by : Eric J. Danenberg, Carl Ellsworth; Teleplay by : Carl Ellsworth, Ben Andron	15 March 2007	106
Macky and the gang plan to rescue some slaves forced to work in the Roman granaries.
7	7	"Lost in Alexandria"	Dave Osborne	Paul Diamond	16 March 2007	107
Little Leah goes missing in the back streets of the city and is tricked into enslavement in a sweatshop run by Toadie. With help from Portia, Macky works to foil the scheme.
8	8	"The One That Got Away"	Dave Osborne	Dwayne McDuffie	19 March 2007	108
While Macky and the girls are minding the shop, a petty thief steals a silver fish with vital information to the rebel movement engraved on it.
9	9	"Doing Our Part"	Dave Osborne	Robert Goodman	20 March 2007	109
It's Purim time, and while Macky, Sollie and the kids act out the story of Queen Esther, Diana tries to lead destitute refugees through the dangerous streets.
10	10	"Horseplay"	Dave Osborne	Alan Burnett	21 March 2007	110
Leah is out on Macky's horse without permission and easily outrides a spoiled Roman boy, who then challenges her to a horse race so he can salvage his damaged pride.
11	11	"Exodus"	Dave Osborne	Dwayne McDuffie	22 March 2007	111
As Macky's family and guests celebrate Passover, Portia brings her Roman tutor with her to dinner but Leah recalls Lydia from a previous encounter.
12	12	"No Way Out"	Dave Osborne	Paul Diamond	23 March 2007	112
Macky and his family have left Alexandria and sought safety out in the desert, but news from Sollie takes them back to the city where they encounter an old adversary who has learnt some important lessons.
13	13	"No Turning Back"	Dave Osborne	Paul Diamond	23 March 2007	113
With Samuel imprisoned and Caleb injured, Macky, Portia and the gang devise a scheme to use storm rainwater to flood the palace jail, hoping to force the guards to open the jail doors. Portia is given worrying news by Tiberius, and Macky reaches one of the most important decisions of his life.

=== Series 2 (2008) ===
No. overall	No. in series	Title	Directed by	Written by	Original release date	Prod. code
14	1	"One of Us"	Dave Osborne	Ben Andron	17 March 2008	201
Macky arrives in Jerusalem disguised as a member of Portia's entourage, and soon comes across old adversaries and several new friends.
15	2	"Over Walls"	Dave Osborne	Stan Berkowitz	17 March 2008	202
Macky is now a dependable courier between Jerusalem and the outside world, but he is soon given a job by Sarah, the zealot girl, which might be too much even for him.
16	3	"The Ram"	Dave Osborne	Stan Berkowitz	9 May 2008	203
The Romans are bringing in a huge battering ram to use against the walled city of Jerusalem. The zealots in the city draw strength from the story of Elijah, Ahab and Naboth's Vineyard, and Macky receives help from Lucius.
17	4	"Rescue Strangers"	Dave Osborne	Stan Berkowitz	9 May 2008	204
It seems Macky may be getting a little full of himself. Isaac retells the story of Paul and Barnabas who objected to being treated as gods in Lystra but, later, a stranger named Tamar urges him to attempt a risky mission.
18	5	"Prince for a Day"	Dave Osborne	Paul Diamond	27 June 2008	205
Macky sets out to rescue the real Daniel, this time disguised as a Roman noble.
19	6	"Unwilling Guests"	Dave Osborne	Paul Diamond	27 June 2008	206
Toadie convinces General Tiberius to allow him to take hostages from the nearby villages to be executed if Macky doesn't turn himself in. Macky must go into the heart of the Roman camp once again to try and stop the executions.
20	7	"Aid and Comfort"	Dave Osborne	Len Uhley	1 August 2008	207
Toadie has a fever and only Macky can get the medicine that will save him.
21	8	"Hostages"	Dave Osborne	Robert Goodman	1 August 2008	208
After hearing Macky's retelling of the story of Herod and the Wise Men, Portia hatches a plan which could force her uncle and the Romans to allow Jerusalem's children to escape the besieged city.
22	9	"The Big Lift"	Dave Osborne	Paul Diamond	12 September 2008	209
As the people in Jerusalem starve, Macky finds a store of grain which Toadie has stolen and hidden in the Roman camp. Macky must work out how to take the grain into the besieged city.
23	10	"Home"	Dave Osborne	Ben Andron	12 September 2008	210
The Romans are tearing down homes outside Jerusalem and using them for building material. Isaac must collapse the tunnels beneath their home to prevent Toadie discovering the trail to other rebel safe houses.
24	11	"Desperate Measures"	Dave Osborne	Robert Goodman	31 October 2008	211
The zealots decide to kidnap General Tiberius.
25	12	"Toadie on Trial"	Dave Osborne	Paul Diamond	31 October 2008	212
Toadie accuses Portia of being a rebel sympathiser.
26	13	"Hope"	Dave Osborne	Len Uhley	31 October 2008	213
With Macky still imprisoned, Tiberius launches the final assault on Jerusalem.

=== Series 3 (2008–09) ===
No. overall	No. in series	Title	Directed by	Written by	Original release date	Prod. code
27	1	"Gladiator School"	Dave Osborne	Paul Diamond	12 December 2008	301
Macky and Portia finally arrive in Rome, but under different conditions: Portia is welcomed as the niece of Rome's famous General Tiberius, while Macky has arrived in chains, and is sold to a school for gladiators.
28	2	"School's Out"	Dave Osborne	Robert Goodman	12 December 2008	302
When Macky refuses to kill another trainee during practice, the gladiator school manager decides to send him to the arena the next day. Because he won't kill, he will almost certainly be killed. Portia goes to Senator Antonius, who has spoken out on behalf of the Friends of Jesus in the Senate.
29	3	"Friends, Romans and Mystery Men"	Dave Osborne	Joelle Sellner; Michelle Lander	6 February 2009	303
Macky is now a slave in Senator Antonius's home. After telling the story of Jesus calming the storm to the Senator's two children, to help them get to sleep during a dramatic storm, Macky discovers something extraordinary about their father.
30	4	"Sowing the Seeds"	Dave Osborne	Len Uhley	6 February 2009	304
Toadie has a new job: he is managing a gladiator, and finds he must resort to his usual cheating habits.
31	5	"Senators Only"	Dave Osborne	Paul Diamond	6 March 2009	305
Marcus has an evil plan in the works, and he enlists Toadie to help him. Determined to find out what's going on, Portia sets out to do some detective work at a mysterious warehouse where she runs into Macky, who then gets into serious trouble.
32	6	"Senators First"	Dave Osborne	Paul Diamond	6 March 2009	306
Macky escapes from the warehouse with Portia, but he is badly injured. Later Portia finds she must take the lead in foiling Marcus's plot.
33	7	"Rome Alone"	Dave Osborne	Stan Berkowitz	3 April 2009	307
Convinced he knows who the Masked Rebel is, Marcus orders Toadie to spy on Antonius. Toadie sneaks into Antonius's house believing no-one is home, but this turns out to be untrue.
34	8	"Give and Take"	Dave Osborne	Len Uhley	3 April 2009	308
Macky and the Masked Rebel rescue some slaves from certain death in the Circus Maximus. An angry Marcus orders Aemelia to be jailed, planning to use Babatunji as bait.
35	9	"Spies and Lies"	Dave Osborne	Robert Goodman	22 May 2009	309
Macky urges Antonius to speak out against Marcus in the Senate, but Antonius is reluctant to openly confront Marcus. Later, Antonius is wrongly arrested after accusations by Marcus.
36	10	"Conflict"	Dave Osborne	Robert N. Skir	22 May 2009	310
Hoping to gain approval and payment, Toadie informs Antonius that Marcus is planning to rob Rome's treasury. Later, Macky and the Masked Rebel confront Marcus and his men inside the treasury.
37	11	"Betrayal"	Dave Osborne	Len Uhley	3 July 2009	311
News arrives that Felix is in trouble, and later Antonius is arrested.
38	12	"Trials and Tribulations"	Dave Osborne	Dwayne McDuffie	3 July 2009	312
Portia seeks the Emperor's help to get Antonius released, but the Emperor decides not to intervene.
39	13	"The Road Ahead"	Dave Osborne	Paul Diamond	3 July 2009	313
Macky finally decides he must leave Rome and Portia must decide what she wants her future to be.

== Reception ==
The program was shown in BBC TV in 2007, and since then is available on DVD with accompanying school and Sunday school lessons. It is hailed as "The Best Youth/Children's Programme of 2007" by the UK's Religious Broadcasting Council.
