= Mischief City =

Canadian animated children's show

- Created by: Peter Moss
- Based on: Mischief City by Tim Wynne-Jones
- Developed by: Michael McGowan
- Directed by: Jerry Popowich
- Starring: Austin Di Iulio; Annick Obonsawin; Adrian Truss; John Stocker; Peter Oldring
- Theme music composer: Jono Grant; Ron Proulx
- Composer: George Guerrette
- Country of origin: Canada
- No. of seasons: 2
- No. of episodes: 26

Production
- Executive producers: Peter Moss; Christina Jennings; Scott Garvie; Clint Eland
- Producer: Suzanne French
- Animator: 9 Story Entertainment
- Running time: 11 minutes
- Production companies: Mercury Filmworks; Shaftesbury Films

Original release
- Network: YTV
- Release: January 4 – December 22, 2005

Mischief City is a Canadian animated children's television series based on the book of the same name by Tim Wynne-Jones. It follows the adventures of Winchell Adams in the extraordinary world of Mischief City. While in this fantasy world, Winchell is accompanied by Maxine and her two monsters Hey Hey and Mr. Cube. The group often faces odd and unusual problems (such as bathtub races and stopping a meteor of solid peas from hitting the planet) most of which are a direct result of Maxine's troublesome older brother Duane. The series first aired on January 4, 2005.

== Storyline ==
Each episode follows a fairly consistent plot. The episodes begin in Winchell's house where Winchell is confronted with a real-world problem (such as his younger sister stealing his sea chimps or realizing how small he is) but before he can solve it, he is whisked away to the fantasy world of Mischief City. There he is immediately greeted by Maxine and her two monsters Hey Hey and Mr. Cube. Maxine usually informs Winchell of some trouble or event occurring in Mischief City which the group attends to, resulting in an adventure. Once the adventure in Mischief City has concluded, Winchell returns to the real world and is able to deal with the initial problem.

== Characters ==
- Winchell Adams (voiced by Austin Di Iulio) - An eight-year-old boy with red hair, freckles and a yellow striped shirt. As the main character, Winchell constantly switches between the real world and the fantasy world of Mischief City and must deal with problems in both worlds as a result. He often provides imaginative solutions to the Mischief City problems and has demonstrated a comprehensive understanding of how this fantasy world works. Often, Winchell even surpasses the knowledge that Mischief City's own inhabitants have of their world.
- Maxine (voiced by Annick Obonsawin) — An inhabitant of Mischief City. She wears large purple glasses and an orange shirt with striped sleeves. Her green hair is tied into pony tails which also function as helicopter blades allowing Maxine to fly. She is Winchell's primary friend in the series and often provides Winchell with the current events of Mischief City when he arrives. She is the owner and caretaker of the two monsters Hey Hey and Mr. Cube. She has a villainous older brother named Duane.
- Hey Hey (voiced by Adrian Truss) — A green monster with a pear-shaped body, downward-facing horns and large nose. Dimwitted and inarticulate, Hey Hey provides hilarity through stupidity and often does so with his close companion Mr. Cube.
- Mr. Cube (voiced by John Stocker) — An orange hairy monster with a cube-shaped body, upward-facing horns and no nose. As dimwitted as Hey Hey but with a more refined dialect, Mr. Cube also provides humour through stupidity and is a close companion of Hey Hey..
- Duane (voiced by Peter Oldring) — The main antagonist of the series, he is a blue haired teenager that is the older brother of Maxine. Greedy, selfish and power-hungry Duane has been a constant cause of dismay in Mischief City. As a result, he hasn't had many friends and has earned the dislike of both Maxine and her monsters as well as Winchell.

=== Minor characters ===
- Clio (voiced by Annick Obonsawin) – Winchell's baby sister
- Mrs. Adams (voiced by Linda Ballantyne) – Winchell's mother
- Mr. Adams (voiced by Peter Keleghan) – Winchell's father
- Mr. Square (voiced by Frank Welker) – Duane's monstrous dog

== Episodes ==
=== Season 1 (2005) ===
No. overall	No. in season	Title	Written by	Original release date
1	1	"Fairly Odd Monsters"	Unknown	January 4, 2005
1	1	"Captain Kookamunga"	Unknown	January 4, 2005
"Fairly Odd Monsters": After a heated argument over an empty bottle of maple syrup, Hey Hey and Mr. Cube resolve to stop being friends. But with their friendship over, the two have to find new partners to enter the Mischief City bathtub races. "Captain Kookamunga": When Hey Hey and Mr. Cube become ill, Winchell becomes the superhero Captain Kookamunga in order to help his friends find the cure.
2	2	"Scaredy Monster"	Unknown	January 6, 2005
2	2	"Teehouse Follies"	Unknown	January 6, 2005
"Scaredy Monster": To help deal with his fear of the dentist, Winchell resolves to help with Hey Hey and Mr. Cube's fear of heights. But when Maxine comes into real danger, the monsters have to show real bravery in order to save her. "Teehouse Follies": Hey Hey and Mr. Cube invite Maxine and Winchell to a party at their new treehouse but Winchell soon finds that they don't have one. After the group builds a treehouse for the party, Duane is quick to claim it for his own and begins preparations for his own party including making the group party servants. But the treehouse meets a quick end when it is discovered that Hey Hey and Mr. Cube used gum to hold it together.
3	3	"Mayor Of Mischief City"	Unknown	January 11, 2005
3	3	"Dizzyland"	Unknown	January 11, 2005
"Mayor Of Mischief City": Duane has won the election for mayor of Mischief City and has become a self-righteous ruler. Winchell becomes Duane's assistant to try to make Mischief City more fun. But after realizing that Mischief City was already fun enough, Winchell decides to trick Wayne into making Hey Hey and Mr. Cube the new mayors. "Dizzyland": A new amusement park opens in Mischief City called Dizzyland which the group decides to visit. They soon find that they are the only ones there and decide to go into a section of the park called Wonder Wish Land. When they try to leave the group is eaten by a snowmobile monster but manage to escape by making the creature hungry.
4	4	"Nervous Rex"	Unknown	January 13, 2005
4	4	"Circus Monsters"	Unknown	January 13, 2005
"Nervous Rex": Winchell discovers that Maxine's house has been built on an ancient dinosaur burial ground. After digging a large hole in search of dinosaur bones, Duane decides that it will be perfect for a pool. They make a deal that if Winchell and the gang can find a dinosaur there will be no pool. However, if they don't the group must build Duane's pool and acts as his personal servants. Luckily the group does find a dinosaur but not before Duane steals their discovery for himself. Quickly thinking, Winchell re-organizes the dinosaur bones into a pirate ship and reclaims the discovery. "Circus Monsters": After a trip to the Mischief City circus, the gang makes a new monster friend named Mugsly. However, when Mugsly begins impressing the monsters with her talents, Maxine worries that she has been replaced. Despite several attempts to improve Maxine's appearance Mugsly constantly upstages her. Maxine decides to confront Mugsly but when she does she finds that it was all a set-up for a surprise party organized by her monsters.
5	5	"Dinner Party"	Unknown	January 18, 2005
5	5	"Dress Code"	Unknown	January 18, 2005
"Dinner Party": After being upstaged by his sister's cuteness at dinner, Winchell travels to Mischief City and plays a game of "How Weird Can You Get" with the gang. In doing so, Winchell discovers that he has a talent for armpit farts. He soon becomes a musical sensation but lets the fame go to his head and begins to forget his friends. To make it up to them, Winchell plays one last concert and invites Maxine, Hey Hey and Mr. Cube to join him on stage. "Dress Code": To escape the bores of a wedding, Winchell goes to Mischief city and celebrates Goop Day with the group. Duane shows off his new goop suit to the gang but the suit is evil and teams up with Duane to conquer the world. Winchell discovers the plot but is unable to convince the others. At the last minute, the others learn of the goop suit's plan to make a goop suit army. The suits are destroyed when Hey Hey and Mr. Cube pretend to be brainwashed by the suits and lead them into a cleverly disguised washing machine.
6	6	"Gillygalloo"	TBA	TBA
6	6	"Buttering Bread"	TBA	TBA
7	7	"Monster Island"	TBA	TBA
7	7	"Peas in Space"	TBA	TBA
8	8	"Sore Winners"	TBA	TBA
8	8	"Being Mr. Cube"	TBA	TBA
9	9	"Fear and Dusting"	TBA	TBA
9	9	"Yukon Winchell"	TBA	TBA
10	10	"King of Stink"	TBA	TBA
10	10	"Shoo Fly"	TBA	TBA
11	11	"Talking out the Trash"	TBA	TBA
11	11	"Tick Tock Times Ten"	TBA	TBA
12	12	"Dust Bunnies in the Closet"	TBA	TBA
12	12	"Finders of the Lost Toy Box"	TBA	TBA
13	13	"Buster Come Home"	TBA	TBA
13	13	"Mr. Nice Guy"	TBA	TBA

=== Season 2 (2005) ===
No. overall	No. in season	Title	Written by	Original release date
14	1	"Pinball Blizzard"	TBA	TBA
14	1	"Flush-a-by-baby"	TBA	TBA
15	2	"Robotoe"	TBA	TBA
15	2	"Frankenfurter"	TBA	TBA
16	3	"Super Juice"	TBA	TBA
16	3	"Fun Day"	TBA	TBA
17	4	"Me Cube, You Lint"	TBA	TBA
17	4	"Beast in Show"	TBA	TBA
18	5	"Food Fighters"	TBA	TBA
18	5	"Sludge Monkeys"	TBA	TBA
19	6	"The Key to Mischief City"	TBA	TBA
19	6	"No Fleas, Please"	TBA	TBA
20	7	"Rise of the Machines"	TBA	TBA
20	7	"Dream Machine"	TBA	TBA
21	8	"Two Heads Are Better"	TBA	TBA
21	8	"Scavenger Hunt"	TBA	TBA
22	9	"The Winchell Factor"	TBA	TBA
22	9	"Quest for Cube"	TBA	TBA
23	10	"Monster Pound"	TBA	TBA
23	10	"It Aint Easy Staying Green"	TBA	TBA
24	11	"The Lost Resort"	TBA	TBA
24	11	"Space Race"	TBA	TBA
25	12	"Smarty Pants"	TBA	TBA
25	12	"Winchell Vision"	TBA	TBA
26	13	"Sugar Crash"	Unknown	December 22, 2005
26	13	"Cra-Z-Boy"	Unknown	December 22, 2005
