= Getting Along Famously =

Getting Along Famously is a Canadian sitcom that aired on CBC Television in 2006.

Set in the early 1960s, Getting Along Famously starred real-life couple Colin Mochrie and Debra McGrath as the hosts of a television variety show. Supporting cast members included Robin Duke, Bob Martin, Paul O'Sullivan, Ed Sahely and Patrick McKenna.

The pilot episode, Saving Ruby's Ass, aired January 10, 2005. It was one of three sitcom pilots aired by the CBC, along with Walter Ego and Hatching, Matching and Dispatching, as a viewer response poll. Pilots that polled favourably were developed into full series. The CBC previously employed this strategy with the shows Rideau Hall and An American in Canada.

The series was cancelled in June 2006 and released on DVD in October 2006.

== Episodes ==
Episode #	Original Air Date (CBC)	Episode Title
Pilot	10 January 2005	Saving Ruby's Ass
1-01	6 January 2006	Brought to You By...
1-02	13 January 2006	Sister Song
1-03	20 January 2006	Toucha My Hand
1-04	27 January 2006	Producers Lads and Lassie
1-05	3 February 2006	It's Better to Rhyme Than to Receive
1-06	3 March 2006	It's Ruby and Kip
