= The Joe Blow Show =

20023 Canadian TV comedy special

The Joe Blow Show is a Canadian television comedy special, which aired on The Comedy Network in July 2003. It starred Rebecca Northan, Paul O'Sullivan, Debra McGrath, Lisa Merchant and Peter Oldring as the members of the Grass Roots Theatre Collective, an amateur theatre troupe preparing to stage a musical based on the lives of a couple they had discovered shopping at Honest Ed's.

The special had been conceived as a potential pilot for a television series, although it was not picked up. It was created by O'Sullivan and his wife, Linda Kash, although she did not appear in the special as an actor.

Vinay Menon of the Toronto Star reviewed the special positively, writing that "It's perplexing to note The Joe Blow Show is only a one-time special. The Comedy Network could still green-light a series, mind you; it's waiting to gauge reaction to the first effort. This may be fiscally responsible, especially in these times, but it also reflects a skittish, almost cowardly quality that plagues the industry. (A TV network really should know when it has something good. It shouldn't wait to be told.)" Joel Rubinoff of the Waterloo Region Record was more dismissive, writing that "it's like watching a karaoke version of the film Waiting for Guffman (about the exact same thing), with elements of Best in Show and This Is Spinal Tap thrown in for good measure. With no artistic muse of its own, and a bad case of hero worship, Joe Blow is to mockumentaries what Ben Mulroney is to TV hosts: earnest, committed -- and so bland even its edges seem phony."

The cast received a Gemini Award nomination for Ensemble Performance in a Comedy Program or Series at the 19th Gemini Awards in 2004.
