= Walter Ego =

Walter Ego was a Canadian television sitcom pilot, which aired on CBC Television on January 3, 2005.

The show starred Peter Keleghan as cartoonist Walter Davis, whose friends and family often provide fodder for his successful comic strip. The cast also included Diane Flacks, Jackie Burroughs, and Charmion King.

It was one of three sitcom pilots aired by the CBC, along with Getting Along Famously and Hatching, Matching and Dispatching, as a viewer response poll. Pilots that poll favourably will be developed into full series. The CBC previously employed this strategy with the shows Rideau Hall and An American in Canada.
