= Erky Perky =

2006 Australian-Canadian TV series or program

- Erky and Perky
- Genre: Comedy; Animated sitcom
- Created by: David Webster
- Written by: Various
- Directed by: David Webster; Tim Golsby-Smith; Cameron Chittock
- Starring: Jason Barr; Neil Crone; Judy Marshak; Adrian Truss; Ron Rubin; Keith Knight; Melissa Jane Shaw
- Composers: Alex Khaskin; Ken Worth
- Countries of origin: Australia; Canada
- No. of seasons: 3
- No. of episodes: 39 (78 segments)

Production
- Executive producers: Michael Boughen Mathew Street Arnie Zipursky Lisa Fitzpatrick Christopher Mapp (Seasons 2–3) Charles Falzon (Season 3); For YTV: Bonita Siegel (seasons 1–2) Delia Leandres (seasons 1–2) Coral Schoug (season 3)
- Producers: Kristine Klohk; Avrill Stark (creative producer; seasons 1–2); Mandy Fanning (seasons 1–2); Barbara Stephen (season 3); Tracy Lenon (season 3)
- Running time: 22 minutes
- Production companies: CCI Entertainment; Ambience Entertainment; The LaB Sydney

Original release
- Network: Seven Network (Australia); YTV (Canada)
- Release: 7 September 2006 – 7 December 2009

Erky Perky is a CGI-animated television series on YTV developed by CCI Entertainment and Ambience Entertainment, with CGI animation by Australian Visual Effects company The LaB Sydney. It follows two bickering, dim-witted insects, Erky and Perky, who live at a hot dog stand before accidentally being taken to a house. They try to settle into the house, living with fellow house bugs, and hunting for food in a very clean kitchen.

== Plot ==
Two bugs, the Scottish-accented Erky, and his friend, the cowardly and impressionable Perky, live an idyllic life on a downtown hot dog stand. They live the high life until one day they are swept away in a take-out bag and end up in a sterile suburban kitchen with no food in sight. The two bugs are forced to survive in the new and scary "Land of Kitchen". Every day, they are obsessed with finding food, and eventually finding their way home to "Hot Dog Stand". Their quests are almost always befouled by "Mad" Margaret, the self-appointed ruler of Kitchen, and her "sidekick" Cecil.

== Characters ==
- Erquhart "Erky" Windsor (Jason Barr) is a blue, yellow-spotted, Scottish-accented bug who normally takes Perky for granted and makes him try to get food in dangerous schemes. It was revealed in the episode "Perky vs. McBuggy Z" that he is a natural-born rapper and dancer.
- Percival "Perky" Rosenberg (Neil Crone) is a yellow, blue-spotted bug who is Erky's friend and partner. He is very cowardly, impressionable and weak. It is made quite obvious that Perky has a crush on Margaret's niece, Sajuica.
- Cecil (Adrian Truss) appears to be somewhat smitten with the tyrant Margaret, despite being a tenth her size, becoming extremely jealous of her having affairs with newcomer Pablomo, and Erky (when he was under the influence of the Love Crumb).
- Mad Margaret (Judy Marshak) is the self-appointed ruler of the kitchen, usually stops Erky and Perky's plans and when they find food, she generally steals it.
- Sajuica (Melissa Jane Shaw) is Mad Margaret's niece and apparently the "babe" of the kitchen, attracting flies and being flirty. Even the childish Stinks (named for his flight-inducing farts) thinks she is "fine". She fancies Perky.
- Frenzel (Ron Rubin): While Stinks may be smart, it's another bug named Frenzel who takes the cake (literally) when it comes to devising food-getting plans. He always has profitable schemes on the go, preying on other bugs' naiveté or weaknesses to get himself ahead. Often, Perky is the one suffering, being a very gullible and trusting bug. An example of this is when Frenzel was showing young bugs the dangers of Kitchen, and for the final show he tricked Perky into being the German-accented spider, Delilah's "dinner", not telling the frightened bug that it was all an act, and that there wasn't really any danger (unlike most of Frenzel's plans).
- Moldy van Oldy (Keith Knight in seasons 1–2, Rob Greenway in season 3) is a senile old bug. Moldy van Oldy loves to talk and talk for hours, sometimes about actual events, sometimes nothing more than senseless ramblings. One true story he did tell, however, was the tale of Margaret's acquired hydrophobia. When she was about Sajuica's age, and living in an outdoor garden (along with Moldy and presumably other bugs as well), Margaret was sprayed with water from a hose, getting knocked out of the air.
- Stinks (Annick Obonsawin in seasons 1–2, Stacey DePass in season 3) A running gag is that Stinks appears whenever anyone says his "name" (or any other word that sounds similar, such as "thinks"); often this happens when they are bemoaning some misfortune ("This stinks").
- Delilah (Dana Brooks) is a German-accented spider who tells fortunes.
- Boof (Carter Hayden) is Frenzel's assistant; he is a digger bug and was born from an egg that Perky found.
- The Grand Armandor (Andrew Pifko) is Margaret's personal wing and purse designer.

Additional voices are provided by Danny Wells, John Stocker, Linda Sorenson, Lawrence Bayne, Rick Miller, Robin Duke and Robert Tinkler.

== Series overview ==
Season	Episodes	Segments	Originally released	
Season	Episodes	Segments	First released	Last released
1	13	26	September 7, 2006	June 29, 2007
2	13	26	September 5, 2007	March 28, 2008
3	13	26	September 7, 2009	December 7, 2009

== Episodes ==
=== Season 1 (2006–07) ===
No. in season	Title	Original release date
1	"Where Are We? / A Toast to Erky"	September 7, 2006
2	"Flights of Fancy / Web of Death"	September 14, 2006
3	"Burst My Bubble / Sticky Situations"	September 21, 2006
4	"Sucked In / Tongue Tied"	September 28, 2006
5	"Ghostly Goodies / All That Cheese"	October 5, 2006
6	"Cereal Thriller / She Loves Me Not"	October 12, 2006
7	"Erky's Birthday / Location, Location, Location"	October 19, 2006
8	"Got Ya! / Perky the Brave"	October 26, 2006
9	"Little Erky / Go Team"	June 1, 2007
10	"Key to the Kitchen / Cold Snap"	June 8, 2007
11	"The Good Days / Double Dare"	June 15, 2007
12	"Stinks Sinks / Make Me Laugh"	June 22, 2007
13	"The Intruder / Return to Sender"	June 29, 2007

=== Season 2 (2007–08) ===
No. in season	Title	Original release date
1	"Buggy Bug Buggleson / Boof is Born"	September 5, 2007
2	"Broken Wings / The Party"	September 12, 2007
3	"Wildberry Implosion / Party Pooper"	September 19, 2007
4	"You Nut! / Tomorrow's Outlook Fine"	September 26, 2007
5	"Beautiful Music / The Principle of the Thing"	October 3, 2007
6	"Funny Bum / Pantry of Horrors"	October 10, 2007
7	"A Zen Tale / Perky vs. MC Buggy Z"	October 17, 2007
8	"Robobug / A Dance in a Trance"	October 24, 2007
9	"The Inseparables / Pangs & Peaceful Protests"	October 31, 2007
10	"Pablobo Returns / Danger on the Windowsill"	March 7, 2008
11	"Monument to Margaret / Bug Bags"	March 14, 2008
12	"Kitchen Day / Bug in Baby's Clothes"	March 21, 2008
13	"Roamin' Holiday / Blueboy's Treasure"	March 28, 2008

=== Season 3 (2009) ===
No. in season	Title	Original release date
1	"Zapped / Flying High"	September 7, 2009
2	"Bug Eater / Mind Over Matter"	September 14, 2009
3	"Car Trouble / A Trojan Scheme"	September 21, 2009
4	"Erky's Worst Nightmare / Soldier Bugged"	September 28, 2009
5	"Slim Perky / Talking Tum"	October 5, 2009
6	"Bug in From the Cold / Alien Invasion"	October 12, 2009
7	"Where's Cecil / Bug in the Bubble"	October 19, 2009
8	"To Bug or Not to Bug / The Miracle Shootout"	October 26, 2009
9	"Bug House / Perky in Charge"	November 2, 2009
10	"Magic Box / Bugliebeard"	November 9, 2009
11	"Pancake on the Fan / Swat!"	November 16, 2009
12	"Future Crumb / Paddle Whacker"	November 23, 2009
13	"Pop Culture / Up and Away"	December 7, 2009
