= Sloppy Jones =

Canadian comedy series

Sloppy Jones is a Canadian comedy mystery web series, which premiered in 2022 on OutTV Go. The series stars Sophie Nation, Jamie Hart, and Jonathan Neil Alexander as Rory, Harper, and Thomas, three queer servers at Sloppy Jones Bar and Grill, who become murder suspects when they unexpectedly find the dead body of their boss Frank Jones (Colin Mochrie) dismembered in the freezer, and must prove their innocence while trying to find the killer before another murder occurs.

The cast also includes Linda Kash as Frank's widow Deb, as well as Lory Mpiana, Sebastian Sage, Isaac Cunningham, Sam Malkin, Isabel Kanaan, and Jeigh Madjus in supporting roles.

Kash received a Canadian Screen Award nomination for Best Supporting Performance in a Web Program or Series at the 11th Canadian Screen Awards in 2023.
