= Peter Oldring =

Canadian actor

- Born: Peter James Edward Oldring; August 25, 1971 (age 55); Drayton Valley, Alberta, Canada
- Occupations: Actor; comedian
- Years active: 1998–present
- Spouse: Sara Erikson (m. 2010)
- Notable work: Conor Martin in Glenn Martin, DDS, Cody, Tyler, and Ezekiel in Total Drama, Alfred Ashford In Resident Evil – Code: Veronica

Comedy career
- Medium: Film; television; stand-up
- Genres: Comedy; drama

Peter James Edward Oldring (born August 25, 1971) is a Canadian actor and comedian.

== Early life ==
Oldring was born on August 25, 1971 in Drayton Valley, Alberta to Bonnie (née Lytle) and Robin Oldring. He graduated from Sir Winston Churchill High School in 1989 in Calgary, Alberta, and studied at the National Theatre School of Canada.

== Career ==
In addition to performing with The Second City improv group in Toronto and Los Angeles, Oldring has appeared on Canadian television. He was also a regular cast member of the redneck-themed sketch comedy series Blue Collar TV. Feature film roles include K-19: The Widowmaker, Focus and Lost and Delirious. He has a starring role in Intern Academy. He also played Farrah Fawcett's gay assistant in the television film Hollywood Wives. Oldring also appeared in the series Doc and The WB's D.C., as well as in the television movie The Ricky Nelson Story. Oldring voiced Cody, Ezekiel and Tyler in Total Drama. Oldring also starred in the 2007 film Young People Fucking. In 2011, he was cast as "Lonnie" in the Disney XD show Kickin' It. He had a supporting role in two episodes of Psych: Extradition: British Columbia and Extradition II: The Actual Extradition Part.

His voice acting credits include the animated children's show Braceface, Mischief City, Miss Spider's Sunny Patch Kids, My Friend Rabbit, Pelswick, Total Drama, 6teen, Pecola and Glenn Martin, DDS. Oldring has also voicing video game characters, such as Alfred Ashford in Resident Evil – Code: Veronica.

Oldring has also worked on numerous projects with his longtime creative partner Pat Kelly, including The Comedy Network series Good Morning World and the CBC Radio comedy show This Is That. Oldring appeared on the TV One original series Love That Girl! as a gay hairdresser named Fabian.

In 2017, Oldring appeared in an episode of the Netflix series House of Cards as a Congressman from Florida.

Alongside Paul O'Sullivan, Debra McGrath, Lisa Merchant and Rebecca Northan, he received a Gemini Award nomination for Ensemble Performance in a Comedy Program or Series at the 19th Gemini Awards in 2004 for The Joe Blow Show.

== Personal life ==
Oldring has been married to American actress Sara Erikson since March 2010.

== Filmography ==
=== Film ===
Year	Title	Role	Notes
2001	Lost and Delirious	Phil	
2001	Focus	Willy Doyle	
2002	K-19: The Widowmaker	Vanya Belov	
2003	Miss Spider's Sunny Patch Kids	Gus (voice)	Television special
2003	Hollywood Wives	Danny	Television film
2004	Intern Academy	Mike Bonnert	
2007	Young People Fucking	Dave	
2008	A Miser Brothers' Christmas	Bob, Elf #1 (voices)	
2025	My Weird School	Principal Klutz	Television film

=== Television ===
Year	Title	Role	Notes
1998–2004	History Bites	Various characters	102 episodes
1999	Power Stone	Wang-Tang (voice)	Unknown episodes
2000	D.C.	Unknown character	Episode: "Pilot"
2001–2002	Screech Owls	Mr. Dillinger	6 episodes
2000–2002	Pelswick	Goon Gunderson (voice)	26 episodes
2001	Undergrads	Spud (voice)	3 episodes
2001	The Endless Grind	Various characters	Unknown episodes
2001–2002	Pecola	Bongo (voice)	12 episodes
2001–2005	Braceface	Conner Mackenzie (voice)	45 episodes
2002–2003	Moville Mysteries	Olaf, Crandall Crudop, Luthor's nephew (voices)	3 episodes
2003	The Joe Blow Show	Johny	Main role; pilot
2003–2010	Franny's Feet	Additional voices	Unknown episodes
2004	Corner Gas	Steven – Lacy's ex fiancé	Episode: "All My Ex's Live in Toronto"
2004–2006	Blue Collar TV	Various characters	5 episodes
2004–2008	Miss Spider's Sunny Patch Friends	Gus (voice)	14 episodes
2005	Mischief City	Duane (voice)	Unknown episodes
2006–2007	Di-Gata Defenders	Kid Cole (voice)	2 episodes
2007	Good Morning World	Andy Peppers	26 episodes
2007	The Boondocks	Cop #1	Episode: "Thank You for Not Snitching"
2007–2008	My Friend Rabbit	Rabbit (voice)	26 episodes
2007–2013	Total Drama	Cody, Tyler, Ezekiel (voices)	45 episodes
2009–2010	Psych	Corporal Robert Mackintosh	2 episodes
2009–2011	Glenn Martin, DDS	Conor Martin (voice)	40 episodes
2011	Skatoony	Ezekiel (voice)	Episode: "Dinosaurs"
2011	Kickin' It	Lonnie	3 episodes
2011–2014	Love That Girl!	Fabian	59 episodes
2013	Mother Up!	Gary, French Baker (voices)	Episode: "Pilot"
2015	BoJack Horseman	Additional voices	Episode: "Let's Find Out"
2016–2017	Atomic Puppet	Sergeant Subatomic (Mookie) (voice)	23 episodes
2017	2 Broke Girls	Boyd	Episode: "And the Riverboat Runs Throu"
2017	House of Cards	Florida Congressman	Episode: "Chapter"
2018	Bizaardvark	Mr. Cunningham	Episode: "Her, Me, and Hermie"
2018–2019	Blindspot	Dave Kirkpatrick	2 episodes
2020	Fast & Furious Spy Racers	Prince Ivan, Imposter (voices)	Episode: "Bem-vindo ao Rio"
2021	Archibald's Next Big Thing	Emu Dad	Episode: "Egg's Day Out / The Way of the Snake"
2021	American Crime Story	David E. Kendall	2 episodes
2023	9-1-1: Lone Star	Clint	Episode "Supreme: The Battle for Roe"

=== Video games ===
Year	Title	Role
1999	Power Stone	Wangtang
2000	Resident Evil – Code Veronica	Alfred Ashford
2013	Grand Theft Auto V	The Local Population
2014	Teenage Mutant Ninja Turtles: Brothers Unite	Michelangelo
2014	Teenage Mutant Ninja Turtles	Michelangelo

== Awards and nominations ==
- 2004 – Gemini Award for Best Ensemble Performance in a Comedy Program or Series – Nominated
- 2008 – Gemini Award for Best Performance or Host in a Variety Program or Series – Nominated
- 2009 – Canadian Comedy Award for Best Male Performance – Won
- 2017 – ACTRA Award for Outstanding Performance – Voice (shared with Pat Kelly) – Nominated
- 2018 – Canadian Screen Award for Best Actor in a Web Program or Series, This Is That – Won
