= Clang Invasion =

Animated television series

- Genre: Science fiction comedy Action; Cyberpunk; Animated sitcom
- Created by: Seng Choon Meng
- Developed by: Doug Hadders; Adam Rotstein
- Directed by: Frederick Marcello Wilmot; David Low Da Wei
- Voices of: Patrick McKenna; Linda Kash; Doug Hadders; Julie Lemieux; Annick Obonsawin; Brad Adamson
- Opening theme: "Clang Invasion"
- Ending theme: "Clang Invasion" (instrumental)
- Composers: Daniel Ingram; Steffan Andrews
- Countries of origin: Canada; Singapore; Hong Kong
- Original language: English
- No. of seasons: 1
- No. of episodes: 26 (52 segments)

Production
- Executive producers: Steven DeNure; Anne Loi; Seng Choon Meng; Steven Ching Chi Wai
- Producer: Beth Stevenson
- Running time: 22 minutes (11 minutes per segment)
- Production companies: AGOGO Entertainment Ltd. Scrawl Studios; Decode Entertainment

Original release
- Network: YTV
- Release: September 12, 2009 – February 12, 2010

Clang Invasion is a Singaporean/Canadian/Hong Kong children's animated television series produced for the Canadian children's programming channel YTV, where it first premiered on September 12, 2009. It also aired on Nickelodeon, Clan TVE in Spain, Gloob in Brazil, Canal J in France, ABC Me in Australia, and Pop in the UK. 26 episodes were produced and first aired from September 12, 2009 to February 12, 2010 on YTV, with reruns airing until September 2, 2011 or 2024.

== Plot ==
Three alien robots, Rivet, Widgit and Socket, accidentally crashed their spaceship on a backyard tree on Earth. Human twins Robin and Daisy Harrison, and their pet dog Sam went to investigate the crash, where they encounter the robots. Incapable of returning to Planet Clang, the robots become friends with Robin and Daisy, made Sam speak by installing a voice box (for one treat), and utilize a spectrum of gadgetry for their goals. The twins also have to keep the robots a secret before Rivet, Widget and Socket return to Planet Clang.

== Characters ==
- Rivet (voiced by Patrick McKenna): The captain of the spaceship, Rivet is a male robot and inventor that serves as a genius to the kids, offering them his inventions. He discovered information about Earth from its old commercial broadcasts into space.
- Widgit (voiced by Linda Kash): The spaceship's navigator and maintainer, Widgit is a female robot who performs poorly technologically compared to the other robots but sympathizes with living things. She can contact with any living thing after accidentally devouring one of Rivet's gadgets.
- Socket (voiced by Doug Hadders): The spaceship's security officer, Socket is a simpler robot, unlike the others. As an old robot, his parts frequently fall off, with Rivet reattaching back Socket's parts. His head also acts as an object storage.
- Robin Harrison (voiced by Julie Lemieux): A 7-year-old red haired human boy and Daisy's fraternal twin brother, Robin thinks the arrival of the robots in his background is the best thing in his life.
- Daisy Harrison (voiced by Annick Obonsawin): A 7-year-old red haired human girl and Robin's fraternal twin sister, Daisy isn't as wise as her age in contrast to him, despite believing the contrary.
- Sam (voiced by Brad Adamson): The Harrisons' dog, Sam is possibly of Labrador Retriever breed. He was given a voice box on his collar from the robots in order to speak, thus rendering him talkative.

== Episodes ==
The dates that follow are when the episodes were initially developed and released in Singapore and England and not when they debuted in Canada, which was over 3 years later.

1. Countdown to Destruction / When Life Gives You Lemons - September 12, 2009
2. I, Giant Robot / Super Excellent Fantastical Man... and Daisy - September 19, 2009
3. Home a Clone / Pause and Order -September 26, 2009
4. To Everything Learn, Learn, Learn / The Fluffy Kitten... of Death - October 3, 2009
5. The Road to Invention / Queen Bumble Bee - October 10, 2009
6. O Tannenbomb / Teleputty - October 17, 2009
7. Welcome to My Nightmare / Trick or Treat or Trick or Treat - October 24, 2009
8. Ace Up His Sleeve / The Fright Stuff - October 31, 2009
9. Hide and Seek and Destroy / Go Kart a Go-Go - November 7, 2009
10. Chicken-Pocalypse / The E.A.R.L. Files - November 14, 2009
11. Freaky Monday / You Can't Handle the Tooth - November 23, 2009
12. Oh Snow He Didn't / Total Eclipse of the Art - November 30, 2009
13. Close Encounters of the Love Kind / Completely Lost in Space - December 7, 2009
14. The Big Dance / Lemur Come Back to Me - December 14, 2009
15. Two Dads Are Better Than One / The Polar-Bear Express - December 28, 2009
16. Hail to the Chief / With Friends Like These - January 6, 2010
17. License to Drive / Bullyworth - January 7, 2010
18. Recycle, Reuse, Re-Boot / Say Cheese - January 8, 2010
19. Bring Your Parents to Work Day / The Grandma Illusion - January 11, 2010
20. Robin Boy Genius... Naaaaa / Back on the Clang Gang - January 12, 2010
21. To Air is Devine / Field of Mean - January 13, 2010
22. There Goes the Neighbourhoodistan / On the Run - January 14, 2010
23. Evolution Solution / To Sasquatch a Thief - January 16, 2010
24. A Kung Fu Star is Born / Citizen Lame - January 18, 2010
25. Alien Happy Fun Time Challenge / Living It Upgrade - January 19, 2010
26. April Fools / Dazed and Com-pooched - February 12, 2010

== Production ==
The series was originally going to be called Gizmo. The series was co-produced by Decode Entertainment, Agogo Entertainment and Scrawl Studios. DHX Media is the distributor.
