= Linda Kash =

Canadian actress (born 1961)

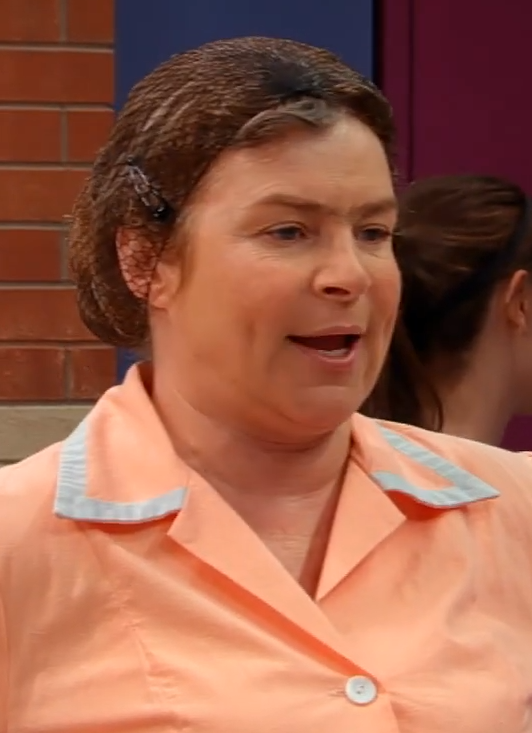
- Kash in The Stanley Dynamic
- Born: 17 January 1961 (age 65); Montreal, Quebec, Canada
- Occupation: Actress
- Years active: 1986–present
- Partner: Paul O'Sullivan (1994–2012; his death)
- Children: 3
- Parent(s): Eugene Kash; Maureen Forrester
- Relatives: Daniel Kash (brother)

Linda Kash (born 17 January 1961) is a Canadian actress.

== Career ==
Kash was born 17 January 1961 in Montreal. She was a cast member of Second City and played Trudy Weissman in the 1998 Jean Smart sitcom Style & Substance; she has also played various roles in popular television series, such as Seinfeld and Everybody Loves Raymond. In 2003, she was the cocreator of The Joe Blow Show, a television pilot which starred her husband Paul O'Sullivan.

She is best known for her role as the Kraft Philadelphia Cream Cheese Angel, appearing in various commercials advertising the product.

In May 2011, she was announced as the morning show host on CJWV-FM, a new radio station in Peterborough, Ontario, with cohost Dan Duran. She and her husband Paul O'Sullivan also operated the Peterborough Academy of Performing Arts.

She portrayed socialite and philanthropist Molly Brown in the 2012 Global/ITV mini-series Titanic.

== Personal life ==
Kash was born in Montreal, the daughter of actress and opera singer Maureen Forrester and violinist/conductor Eugene Kash. Her brother is actor Daniel Kash. Her father's family was Jewish, whereas her mother converted to Judaism.

Her partner Paul O'Sullivan, also an actor and Second City alumnus, was killed in a car accident on 18 May 2012. Together they had three children.

== Filmography ==
=== Film ===
Year	Title	Role	Notes
1991	The Events Leading Up to My Death	Lindsay	
1993	Ernest Rides Again	Nan Melon	
1994	Ernest Goes to School	Gerta	direct-to-video
1996	Urban Safari	Candy	
1996	Waiting for Guffman	Mrs. Allan Pearl	
1997	Ernest Goes to Africa	Rene Loomis	direct-to-video
1999	Dill Scallion	Wilma Juggs (Baby)	
2000	Apartment Hunting	Realtor	
2000	Xxxposed	Shelley	Short film
2000	Best in Show	Fay Berman	
2005	Cinderella Man	Lucille Gould	
2006	Homie Spumoni	Mrs. Butterman	
2006	Man of the Year	Jenny Adams	
2007	Babysitting Andy	Mom	Short film
2007	Are We Done Yet?	Mrs. Rooney	
2008	The Love Guru	Female Reporter	
2010	Rosie Takes the Train	Rosie	Short film
2011	Running Mates	Maude Beazley	
2011	Servitude	Barb	
2011	Moon Point	Darryl's Mother	
2013	I Was a Boy	Rosalynn	
2014	Fall	Marcie Bell	
2018	Little Italy	Amelia Campoli	
2020	Jump, Darling	Ene	
2024	Thomas & Friends: The Christmas Letter Express	Clarabel (voice)	US dub
2025	Thomas & Friends: Sodor Sing Together	Clarabel, Reginald (voice)	US dub
2026	Surfacing	Katherine	

=== Television ===
Year	Title	Role	Notes
1986	As Is	Woman #1	TV film
1986	Night Heat	Sally	Episode: "Fighting Back"
1987–91	The Comedy Mill		TV series
1988	Biographies: The Enigma of Bobby Bittman	Carla Gambioni	TV short
1988	The Second City Toronto 15th Anniversary	Ruby	TV film
1988	The Best of SCTV	Cassie Mackerel	TV film
1989	Andrea Martin... Together Again	Lurleen Martin	TV film
1989	Madeline	(voice)	TV film
1989	C.B.C.'s Magic Hour		Episode: "Rookies"
1990	Max Glick	Sarah Glick	TV series
1990	Maniac Mansion	Claret O'Hara	Episode: "The Sandman Cometh"
1992	Partners 'n Love	Maxine Smith	TV film
1992	Maniac Mansion	Rose	Episode: "Love: Turner Style"
1993	Street Legal	Bev Moore	Episode: "Believe the Children"
1993	Seinfeld	Gwen	Episode: "The Lip Reader"
1994	She TV	Various	Episode: "1.2"
1995	Side Effects	Gina Florence	Episode: "Snap, Crackle, Pop!"
1995–96	Minor Adjustments	Dr. Francine Bailey	Main role (20 episodes)
1996	Sabrina, the Teenage Witch	M'Lady (voice)	Episode: "A Halloween Story"
1997	Sabrina, the Teenage Witch	Haley	Episode: "Cat Showdown"
1997	The Newsroom	Adelle Grossman	Episode: "The Campaign"
1997	Cybill	Ms. Murphy	Episode: "All of Me"
1997	3rd Rock from the Sun	Margie	Episode: "Fifteen Minutes of Dick"
1997	Everybody Loves Raymond	Celia	Episode: "Father Knows Least"
1998	The Adventures of Shirley Holmes	Jenna Martini	Episode: "The Case of the Exploding Puppet"
1998	Ellen	Sue	Episode: "Ellen in Focus"
1998	Style & Substance	Trudy Weissman	Main role (13 episodes)
1998	Dumb Bunnies	Sue Uppity (voice)	TV series
1999	Foolish Heart	Barbara's Lawyer	Episode: "The Trial"
2000	The Bookfair Murders	Judith Cass	TV film
2000	Life in a Day	Charlotte 'Charlie' Tanzi	TV film
2000–01	Timothy Goes to School	Grace (voice)	8
2001–02	Quads!	Deborah (voice)	Main role (26 episodes)
2001–04	Doc	Nellie Hebert	Recurring role (14 episodes)
2001	Sister Mary Explains It All	Skeptical Husband's Wife	TV film
2001	Committed	Val	Recurring role
2002–03	Made in Canada	Diane Parkman	Episodes: "The War of 1812", "People of the Fish"
2002	Cadet Kelly	Samantha	TV film
2002	Monk	Dolly Flint	Episode: "Mr. Monk and the Psychic"
2002	Pelswick	Spagna (voice)	Episode: "Hear No Evil, P.C. No Evil"
2003	The Music Man	Alma Hix	TV film
2003	Full-Court Miracle	Cynthia Schlotsky	TV film
2005	Puppets Who Kill	Thompson	Episode: "The CBC Is Killing Again"
2005	Naturally, Sadie	Ms. Yarm	Episode: "Right-Minded"
2005	Degrassi: The Next Generation	Bernice Fein	Episode: "Venus: Part 1"
2006	At the Hotel	Folly	Episodes: "Welcome to the Rousseau", "The Perfect Couple"
2006	Wedding Wars	Mrs. Fairfield	TV film
2007	The Altar Boy Gang	Diane Gallagher	TV film
2007	'Til Death Do Us Part	Pat Stevens	Episode: "A Christmas Murder"
2007–08	Clang Invasion	Widgit (voice)	TV series
2007–08	Robson Arms	Carol Goldstein	Recurring role (9 episodes)
2008	Less Than Kind	Dr. Silverstein	Episode: "Note Perfect"
2009	Less Than Kind	Dr. Silverstein	Episodes: "Careers Day", "Happy Birthday Sheldon"
2009	Skyrunners	Robin Burns	TV film
2009–11	The Ron James Show	Various	Recurring role (12 episodes)
2010	Less Than Kind	Hospital Clerk	Episode: "Coming Home"
2010	Cra$h & Burn	Eileen Campbell	Episode: "Til Death"
2010	Happy Town	Miranda Kirby	Episodes: "In This Home on Ice", "I Came to Haplin for the Waters"
2010	The Dating Guy	Adoption Agency Woman (voice)	Episode: "Spontaneous Skidmark"
2011–13	Almost Naked Animals	Sloth (voice)	TV series
2011–13	Scaredy Squirrel	Sally Fishlips (voice)	10 episodes
2011	Good Dog	Marla	Episode: "Converting to Judaism"
2011	King	Lesley	Episode: "Farah Elliott"
2011	Life with Boys	Sylvia	Episodes: "Wrestling with Boys", "In the Principal's Office with Boys"
2011	The Cat in the Hat Knows a Lot About That!	Various (voice)	Recurring role (4 episodes)
2012	Great Scot Beer	Miranda	TV film
2012	Titanic	Margaret 'Molly' Brown	TV miniseries
2012–16, 2024–25	Fugget About It	Gina Falcone (voice)	Main role
2013	Sworn to Silence	Mona	TV film
2014	Christmas at Cartwright's	Peg Habershaw	Hallmark film
2014–15	Haven	Maddie	2 episodes
2016	L.M. Montgomery's Anne of Green Gables	Mrs. Barry	TV film
2017	Fargo	Stella Stussy	2 episodes
2017–18	Mysticons	Queen Goodfey (voice); Kymraw (voice)	Supporting roles
2019	Cavendish	June	TV series
2020	Corn & Peg	Miss Panfry/Scientist Judy (voice)	TV series
2020	Elinor Wonders Why	Grandma Rabbit (voice)	Episode: "Backyard Soup"
2021	Batwoman	Candice Long / The Candy Lady	Episode: "Fair Skin, Blue Eyes"
2021–25	Thomas & Friends: All Engines Go	Clarabel, Princess (voice)	TV series; (US) (UK; 2021)
2022	Sloppy Jones	Deb Jones	TV series
2024	Falling Together	Linda Payne	Hallmark film

== Awards and nominations ==
Awards
Year	Award	Category	Production	Result
2001	Canadian Comedy Awards	Film - Pretty Funny Female Performance	Best in Show	Nominated
2003	Phoenix Film Critics Society Awards	Best Ensemble Acting	Best in Show	Nominated
2003	Gemini	Best Individual Performance in a Comedy Program or Series	Made in Canada	Nominated
2004	Florida Film Critics Circle Awards	Best Ensemble Cast	Best in Show	Won
2006	Gemini	Best Performance by an Actress in a Guest Role Dramatic Series	At the Hotel ("The Perfect Couple")	Won
2007	Gemini	Best Performance by an Actress in a Guest Role Dramatic Series	Robson Arms ("Mr. Lonely")	Nominated
2017	Actra Award	Best Performance in an Animated Series	Fugget About It ("Gina Falcone")	Won
2023	Canadian Screen Awards	Best Supporting Performer, Web Program or Series	Sloppy Jones ("Deborah Jones")	Nominated
