= Good Morning World (Canadian TV series) =

- Andy Peppers and Allister Coulter
- Created by: Peter Oldring; Pat Kelly
- Starring: Peter Oldring; Pat Kelly
- Country of origin: Canada
- No. of seasons: 1
- No. of episodes: 26

Production
- Executive producers: Richard D'Alessio; Dave Thomas
- Producers: Peter Oldring; Pat Kelly
- Running time: 30 Minutes (with commercial)

Original release
- Network: The Comedy Network
- Release: November 16, 2007

Good Morning World is a 2007 satirical television show posing as a fictional morning show called "Good Morning World". It starred (and was also created by) Peter Oldring and Pat Kelly, as hosts Andy Peppers and Allister Coulter.

The show aired on Fridays at 8:30 pm ET/PT on The Comedy Network. Each TV episode served as a recap of the previous week of webisodes, available to view at the comedy network.

In an interview with newteevee.com, co-creator and star Peter Oldring stated that the show was entirely improvised.
