= Franny's Feet =

Canadian television series

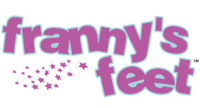
- Genre: Animated series Fantasy
- Created by: Cathy Moss; Susin Nielsen
- Written by: Nicole Demerse; Shelley Hoffman; Louise Moon; Cathy Moss; Susin Nielsen; Robert Pincombe; Betty Quan; John Slama; Steve Westren; Lienne Sawatsky; Dan Williams; Karen Moonah; Katherine Sandford
- Directed by: Joanne Boreham
- Voices of: Phoebe McAuley; George Buza
- Theme music composer: Amin Bhatia; Ari Posner
- Opening theme: "Where Will My Feet Take Me Today?" performed by Tajja Isen
- Ending theme: "Where Will My Feet Take Me Today?" (instrumental)
- Composers: Amin Bhatia; Meiro Stamm
- Country of origin: Canada
- Original language: English
- No. of seasons: 3
- No. of episodes: 52 (104 segments)

Production
- Executive producers: Steven DeNure; Neil Court; Beth Stevenson
- Producers: Elana Adair (S1, S3); Kym Hyde (S2)
- Editor: Paul Hunter
- Running time: 30 minutes
- Production company: Decode Entertainment (Note: As DECODE/Franny Productions Inc. for season 1, DECODE/Franny Productions 2 Inc. for season 2, and DECODE/Franny Productions 3 Inc. for season 3.)

Original release
- Network: Family Channel (Canada, seasons 1–2); Playhouse Disney (Canada, season 3); Five (United Kingdom, seasons 1–2)
- Release: July 8, 2003 – October 31, 2010

Franny's Feet (French: Franny et les chaussures magiques) is a Canadian animated children's television series created by writer Cathy Moss and partner Susin Nielsen. The series was produced by Decode Entertainment, with the participation of Family Channel, in association with Channel Five Broadcasting Limited (seasons 1–2), with animation production by C.O.R.E. Toons. The series follows the adventures of Frances "Franny" Fantootsie (a name combination of "fantasy" and "tootsie") as she tries on a new shoe and travels to different countries.

Franny's Feet aired on Family Channel from July 8, 2003, to October 31, 2010. It also aired on Five in the UK and PBS Kids in the US. A total of 52 episodes were produced across three seasons.

== Plot ==
Franny Fantootsie is a 5-year-old girl who visits her Grandpa every day at his shoe repair shop in Vancouver, British Columbia, Canada. At the beginning of each episode, Franny either talks with her Grandpa about certain things or encounters a problem while playing or doing an activity, until a customer comes. When this happens, Franny will say "A customer!" excitedly.

The customer presents shoes needing to be repaired to Grandpa, who then gives them to Franny to place inside the shoe repair box. Franny then goes to the shoe repair box, and instead of putting the shoes in the box, she puts them down next to her feet and says, "Where will my feet take me today?". Franny then tries on the shoes and they take her to a different magical place in each episode such as a Native American magic world in Wyoming, a sunny beach in Jamaica, a high mountain in China, the Great Barrier Reef off the coast of Australia, and so on. Franny then meets a different kind of person or animal, depending on the location, that she befriends and solves a certain problem for.

At the end of each adventure, after Franny solves the problem in a magical place and returns to the repair shop, she places the shoes in the repair box and receives a special treasure hidden in one of the shoes she wore during her trip and adds it to her shoebox filled with her other treasures. She then tells her Grandpa about her adventure and then solves her previous problem based on how she solved her friend's problem during her adventure. Every episode ends with Franny saying, "Where will my feet take me tomorrow?".

== Voice cast ==
=== Main ===
- Phoebe McAuley as Frances "Franny" Fantootsie
- George Buza as Grandpa Fantootsie

=== Supporting/minor ===
- Denis Akiyama as additional voices
- Mitchel Amaral as additional voices
- Juan Chioran as Nat the Yak
- Amos Crawley as Henry the Mouse/Spencer the Skunk
- Neil Crone as additional voices
- Damon D'Oliveira as additional voices
- Stacey DePass as Kinka the Kinkajou/Sally the Tough Old Cat/Jerry the Penguin/Darlene the Duck
- Rachel Devon as additional voices
- Carlos Díaz as Johnnie
- Mitchell Eisner as additional voices
- Jordan Francis as Johnny the Jamaican Boy
- Sarah Gadon as additional voices
- Terri Hawkes as Jessie the Music Star
- Dwayne Hill as additional voices
- Tajja Isen as Lacey/Eloise, Franny's singing voice
- Athena Karkanis as additional voices
- Kim Kuhteuble as additional voices
- Julie Lemieux as Bobby Jean the Hen/Zelda the Wild Boar/Susan the Sloth/Princess Tia
- Marc McMulkin as Jacques the Hockey Player
- Daniel Magder as additional voices
- Diego Matamoros as additional voices
- Scott McCord as additional voices
- Stephanie Anne Mills as Ice-Skater Customer/Marie the Blonde-Haired Girl/Lulu the Loon
- Monique Mojica as additional voices
- Annick Obonsawin as Deshta the Ostrich
- Peter Oldring as Randall the Duck and Ralph the Hare
- Luca Perlman as additional voices
- Cara Pifko as additional voices
- Gabe Plener as additional voices
- Adam Reid as additional voices
- Mark Rendall as Adam the Camper
- Martin Roach as Joey the Dogsled
- Susan Roman as additional voices
- Jackie Rosenbaum as additional voices
- Ron Rubin as additional voices
- Rob Smith as additional voices
- Robert Tinkler as Sasal the Donkey/Walter the Sheep
- Melanie Tonello as Penny the Artist's Daughter
- Jonathan Wilson as Morrison the Monkey/Galileo
- Rod Wilson as additional voices

== Production ==
Produced by Decode Entertainment, Franny's Feet is aimed at younger children and centers on how upbeat is the initial exploration.

== Episodes ==
=== Season 1 (2003) ===
1. Wonderful Woolies/A Home for Herman (July 8, 2003)
2. Small is Beautiful/Opening Night Jitters (July 26, 2003)
3. Not Yeti/Jingle Dress (August 2, 2003)
4. Ride 'em Cowboy/Monkey Stuff (August 9, 2003)
5. You Bug Me/Double Trouble (August 16, 2003)
6. Paper Presents/Fowl Weather (August 23, 2003)
7. Egg Sitting/Arctic Antics (August 30, 2003)
8. Under the Sea/Bedtime for Bears (September 13, 2003)
9. A Visit to the Vet/Game Over (September 19, 2003)
10. The Lonely Library/What's So Funny? (September 22, 2003)
11. Paint Job/Yummy in My Tummy (September 26, 2003)
12. Whiz Kid/Birds of a Feather (October 11, 2003)
13. Fancy Footwork/Say Jamaica (October 31, 2003)

=== Season 2 (2004–2007) ===
1. Franny's Manners/Swamp Thing (March 14, 2004)
2. A Pirate's Treasure/Nat the Yak (April 26, 2004)
3. Hop to It/Make Them Laugh (May 10, 2004)
4. Night Time/Bear Facts (July 24, 2004)
5. Jumbo Hi-Jinx/The Fais-Do-Do (September 4, 2004)
6. Messy Monkey/Greece is the Word (September 8, 2004)
7. Princess Tia/Chez Lou Lou (September 12, 2004)
8. Sweet Mystery/Standout Performance (October 16, 2004)
9. Long Stories/Best in Show (October 30, 2004)
10. Reindeer to the Rescue/Bright Idea (December 4, 2004)
11. A Pony Tale/Puppet Pals (February 12, 2005)
12. Octopus's Garden/The Colossal Fossil (March 5, 2005)
13. The Big Race/It's a Big Job (April 12, 2005)
14. Pink Flamingos/Granny Nanny Goat (May 4, 2005)
15. A Little Moose Music/The Great Museum Caper (October 22, 2005)
16. Franny and Five-Pin/Net Worth (November 5, 2005)
17. Iguana Play Paddle Ball/Lighthouse Lily (March 18, 2006)
18. Like Magic/Scatterbrained Squirrel (May 13, 2006)
19. Armadillo Allergy/Bee Patient (September 2, 2006)
20. Unhappy Hippo/Westward Ho (September 30, 2006)
21. Happy Halloween/Tunnel Vision (November 25, 2006)
22. Shiver Me Timbers/Mount Do It Later (January 13, 2007)
23. Mischievous Magpies/Snowy Jamaica (May 12, 2007)
24. Lost in Mexico/It's Snow Small Feat (July 21, 2007)
25. Pilot Project/Season's Greetings (August 25, 2007)
26. There's No Place Like Home/Old Friends, New Friends (October 13, 2007)

=== Season 3 (2009–2010) ===
1. Stargazing/Tower Power (September 10, 2009)
2. Slippery Sandcastle/Butterfingers (September 17, 2009)
3. Picture This/Sound Advice (September 24, 2009)
4. Rainforest Games/Shake Those Beans (October 1, 2009)
5. Flight of Fancy/Totem Trouble (October 8, 2009)
6. Papa Penguin/Ballroom Bugaboo (October 15, 2009)
7. Wedding Day Woe/A Perfect Fit (October 22, 2009)
8. On Your Toes/It Figures (October 29, 2009)
9. Iwi the Kiwi/Clothes Call (January 3, 2010)
10. Lots of Space/Tulip Parade (January 10, 2010)
11. Pandamonium/So to Speak (January 17, 2010)
12. Sweet Talk/Lights in the Night (February 24, 2010)
13. Going Ape!/Halloween Harvest (October 31, 2010)

== Telecast and home media ==
=== Canada ===
The series first aired on Family Channel and later Family Jr. (formerly Playhouse Disney) in Canada on July 8, 2003, and concluded on October 31, 2010. Repeats were shown on Family Jr. in the mid-2010s.

Peace Arch Entertainment/Kaboom! Entertainment held home video rights to the series in Canada and America.

=== Europe ===
The series aired on Five in the UK as part of the Milkshake! block, premiering on 27 October 2003. The broadcaster co-commissioned the series with Family Channel. The series has also aired on Discovery Kids, Playhouse Disney and Tiny Pop.

Universal Pictures Video subsidiary Vision Video Ltd. held home video rights to the series.

This series aired on France 5 in France and MiniMini in Poland.

=== US ===
In 2006, it aired on PBS Kids until early 2010. In 2008, it aired on the now-defunct Sprout in the US (co-funded by NYC station WNET, also a co-producer).

It formerly aired on the now-defunct Light TV in 2016 until 2019.

The series currently streaming for free on both Tubi and The Roku Channel.

=== Other regions ===
This series aired on ABC Kids in Australia. This series aired on Cartoon Network in Japan.
