= Moville Mysteries =

Canadian animated television series

- Genre: Comedy; Adventure; Science fiction; Horror; Supernatural
- Created by: Guy Vasilovich
- Directed by: Mike Csunyoscka
- Voices of: Frankie Muniz; Dan Petronijevic; Tara Spencer-Nairn
- Narrated by: Frankie Muniz
- Theme music composer: Jonathan Evans; George Tevlin
- Composer: George Guerrette
- Country of origin: Canada
- Original language: English
- No. of seasons: 2
- No. of episodes: 26

Production
- Executive producers: Michael Hirsh; Guy Vasilovich; Scott Dyer; Tom Pong (season 1); Mimbi L. Eloriaga (season 2)
- Producer: Wendy Errington
- Editor: Christopher Gould
- Running time: 22 minutes
- Production companies: Suzhou Hong Yang Cartoon Co. Ltd. (Season 1); Philippine Animators Group Inc. (Season 2); Nelvana Limited

Original release
- Network: YTV
- Release: September 7, 2002 – May 14, 2003

Moville Mysteries is a Canadian animated horror adventure television series starring Frankie Muniz as the voice of Mosley "Mo" Moville. The series was co-produced by Nelvana Limited, Suzhou Hong Yang Cartoon Co. Ltd. for the first season and Philippine Animators Group Inc. for the second season, produced in association with YTV. The series aired from September 7, 2002, to May 14, 2003. 26 episodes were produced over two seasons.

== Premise ==
The series revolves around Mosley "Mo" Moville, a high school student in Ouigee Falls, where the supernatural and strange happen almost every day. Mo loves the supernatural, and loves getting involved with solving the mysteries. Joining him are his friends Tommy "Hitch" Hitchcock and Mimi Valentine. Occasionally, they are joined by local conspiracy theorist Billy "B.B." Boon. The three sometimes don't have anything to do with the plot of the story and instead Mo acts as the narrator.

== Characters ==
- Mosley "Mo" Moville (voiced by Frankie Muniz) is a rather short kid that loves the supernatural. He acts as both the main protagonist and narrator of the series.
- Tommy "Hitch" Hitchcock (voiced by Dan Petronijevic) is Mo's best friend who speaks in stereotypical skater lingo and wears 3-D glasses all the time. Hitch isn't too bright and occasionally gets the team into trouble.
- Mimi Valentine (voiced by Tara Spencer-Nairn) is the lone female of the group and the most level-headed. She acts as the voice of reason and loves animals.
- Billy "B.B." Boon (voiced by Cliff Saunders) is the local conspiracy theorist who always believes aliens are involved in some way. He occasionally is right, just not in the way people think.

== Episodes ==
=== Season 1 (2002) ===
All season 1 episodes are directed by Mike Csunyoscka.

No.	Title	Written by	Storyboard by	Original release date
1	"Raiders of the Lost Jock Strap"	Dale Schott	Lyndon Ruddy and Tim O'Halloran	September 7, 2002
Mo and the gang try to find a lucky jock strap to get the high school basketball team a fighting chance.
2	"The Tell-Tale Recliner"	Dale Schott	Paul Bouchard and Glen Lovett	September 14, 2002
A chronic liar soon finds himself stalked by his father's recliner. Guest starring Michael D. Cohen.
3	"The Day Rico Became Smart"	Story by : Dale Schott; Teleplay by : Brian Lasenby	Lyndon Ruddy, Tim O'Halloran and Drazen Kozjan	September 21, 2002
After a bump on the head, super athlete Rico becomes a super genius. However, he runs afoul an avaricious serial killer scientist who seeks to murder him and extract his brain. Guest starring Zachary Bennett.
4	"How Green Was My Lunch Meat"	Erica Stroebel	Glen Lovett and Rick Marshall	September 28, 2002
Mo starts to believe B.B.'s theory about the addictive mystery meat being the byproduct of aliens.
5	"The Moville Witch Project"	Nicole Demerse	Lyndon Ruddy, Drazen Kozjan and Rob Pincombe	October 5, 2002
Mimi is possessed by her ancestor who was killed by Mo's for being a witch. Guest starring Julie Lemieux and Joyce Gordon.
6	"Swarm Enough For Ya?"	Ben Joseph	Glen Lovett, Rick Marshall and Rob Walton	October 12, 2002
A mysterious exterminator comes to town to take care of the mosquito infestation. Only for Mo and the others to find out he's not human.
7	"The Good Old Days"	Brian Lasenby	Drazen Kozjan and Lyndon Ruddy	October 19, 2002
Mo accidentally time travels back in time and helps his kid grandma fend off a pumpkin headed monster.
8	"Curse of the Mommies"	Ken Ross	Glen Lovett, Rick Marshall and Steve Daye	October 26, 2002
Several mothers of Ouigee Falls start acting like teenage girls, much to their daughter's dismay. Guest starring Alyson Court, Stephanie Anne Mills, and Cara Pifko.
9	"Ghoooul!!"	Frank Young	Lyndon Ruddy and Drazen Kozjan	November 2, 2002
Coach Coach Konkout takes on a dark personality. Guest starring Howard Jerome and Juan Chioran.
10	"The Novelty Kid"	Rob McCleary	Glen Lovett, Steve Daye and Rick Marshall	November 9, 2002
Local conman Norman finds a novelty company with real working products and starts using them to scam people out of their money. Which works until his credit with the company starts piling up.
11	"The Creep Next Door"	Bonnie Chung	Glen Lovett and Steve Daye	November 16, 2002
B.B. tries to convince the others of a vampire. Guest starring Amos Crawley.
12	"Crushed By an Angel"	Simon Racioppa and Richard Elliott	Glen Lovett and Drazen Kozjan	November 23, 2002
Hitch gets a guardian angel girlfriend hiding from her ex. Guest starring Jacqueline Pillon and Peter Oldring.
13	"How Now, Meowing Cow?"	Dale Schott	Lyndon Ruddy and Steve Daye	November 30, 2002
A field trip reveals a farmer genetically engineering animal hybrids. Guest starring John Stocker.

=== Season 2 (2003) ===
No.	Title	Directed by	Written by	Storyboard by	Original release date
14	"The Night and Day and Night of the Hunter"	Larry Jacobs	Frank Young	Glen Lovett and Drazen Kozjan	February 12, 2003
The spoiled heir to the Hunter Toy company tosses out the family heirloom. Now with it gone, a curse has befallen his family. Guest starring Daniel DeSanto and Paul O'Sullivan.
15	"Follow That Mo"	Mike Csunyoscka	Dale Schott and Ken Ross	Lyndon Ruddy and Steve Daye	February 19, 2003
Mo finds a mysterious glass door knob that shows people their deepest desires and turns them into mindless zombies who want more.
16	"Big Toe, Big Evil"	Larry Jacobs	Simon Racioppa and Richard Elliott	Glen Lovett and Drazen Kozjan	February 26, 2003
Mo and the gang learn why the janitor has never taken a day off, with good reason. Guest starring Ron Pardo.
17	"Mirror, Mirror Off the Wall"	Mike Csunyoscka	Bonnie Chung	Glen Lovett and Steve Daye	March 5, 2003
A stuck-up high school girl named Hannah is given her deceased aunt's mirror as inheritance, which compels her to design her own clothes and brings to life her narcissistic side. Guest starring Maryke Hendrikse.
18	"Pet Shop of No Return"	Larry Jacobs	Nicole Demerse	Lyndon Ruddy and Steve Daye	March 12, 2003
Emil, a boy who never takes care of his pets, is given exclusive pets from a mysterious man who will only sell to Emil. Guest starring Darren Frost and Adrian Truss.
19	"Something Fishy in Lake Gimmee-Gimmee-Itchee-Owee"	Mike Csunyoscka	Rob McCleary	Glen Lovett, Dimitrije Kostic and Drazen Kozjan	March 26, 2003
Mo and his dad go off on a father son fishing trip, only to run afoul of giant leeches living in the lake.
20	"Don't Touch That Dial"	Larry Jacobs	Gary Wheeler	Lyndon Ruddy and Steve Daye	April 2, 2003
B.B. accidentally summons an alien bug to Earth looking to lay her eggs. While he and Mo try to stop it, the two are followed by a mysterious old man Mo can't help but recognize.
21	"Sold Your Soul For... What?"	Jason Groh	Ben Joseph	Glen Lovett and Drazen Kozjan	April 9, 2003
Teenage boy Rodney tries to outdo his twin sister Matilda's accordion skills, by any means necessary. Guest starring Laurie Elliott and Maurice Dean Wint.
22	"Just My Luck"	Mike Csunyoscka	Ken Cuperus	Glen Lovett and Drazen Kozjan	April 16, 2003
A mysterious bison headed penny shows up in town, giving its holder one lucky moment, then passes itself off. Which is great until the local jinx gets it, giving everyone else bad luck.
23	"A Hitch in Time"	Mike Csunyoscka	Simon Racioppa and Richard Elliott	Lyndon Ruddy and Steve Daye	April 23, 2003
Hitch messes around with a time traveling watch.
24	"Gnome Sweet Gnome"	Mike Csunyoscka	Hugh Duffy	Lyndon Ruddy and Steve Daye	April 30, 2003
A society of gnomes attacks the town.
25	"Goo on You"	Mike Csunyoscka	Jennifer Pertsch	Glen Lovett and Drazen Kozjan	May 7, 2003
Mo and the others find a green goo that attacks the town, but makes everything clean. However, when it finishes cleaning up everything, it begins going after the source of the filth: humanity.
26	"Scarin' O' the Green"	Mike Csunyoscka	J.D. Smith	Glen Lovett and Drazen Kozjan	May 14, 2003
Mo, Hitch, and Mimi follow the clues to leprechaun gold.

== Broadcast ==
The show was on YTV in Canada and Fox Kids (later Jetix) in Latin America. In terms of digital distribution, the complete series has been made available for streaming on the Rogers Anyplace TV video on demand platform and Tubi TV.
