= George Shrinks =

Canadian children's animated television series

- Title card
- Also known as: William Joyce's George Shrinks
- Genre: Animated series
- Based on: George Shrinks by William Joyce
- Written by: Ken Cuperus; Dave Dias; Hugh Duffy; Richard Elliott; Ben Joseph
- Voices of: Tracey Moore; Bryn McAuley; Robbi Jay Thuet; Paul O'Sullivan; Kathleen Laskey
- Theme music composer: Colin James
- Composer: Roberto Occhipinti
- Countries of origin: Canada; China
- Original language: English
- No. of seasons: 3
- No. of episodes: 40

Production
- Executive producers: William Joyce; Michael Hirsh; Patrick Loubert (seasons 1–2); Clive A. Smith (seasons 1–2); Scott Dyer (season 3); Wallace Wong
- Producer: Michelle Melanson (seasons 2–3)
- Running time: 26 minutes
- Production companies: Nelvana Limited; Jade Animation (Shenzen) Company

Original release
- Network: PBS Kids (United States); TVOntario (TVOKids) (Canada); Knowledge Network (Canada); Access (Canada); SCN (Canada)
- Release: September 30, 2000 – January 23, 2003

George Shrinks is a children's animated television series. It is based on the children's book by William Joyce, co-produced by Nelvana Limited and Jade Animation, produced in association with PBS. The show premiered as part of the PBS Kids Bookworm Bunch block on September 30, 2000, and ended with the final episode on January 23, 2003.

The series differs from the book in that the title character does not return to his normal size at the conclusion, appearing to have already been small with no apparent explanation.

== Premise ==
The series follows the story of a ten-year-old boy named George Shrinks who is only 3 inches (76 mm) tall. George lives with his musician father Harold, his artist mother Perdita, and his little brother Harold Jr. ("Junior" for short), finding adventure with them and his friends (primarily his best bud and neighbour Becky Lopez) in mundane situations - something that comes naturally as a result of his diminutive size. But through a mixture of his own ingenuity and imagination, as well as a variety of highly adaptable mini machines built by him and his dad, George proves that being tiny is no obstacle to solving problems and having fun.

George's tiny size turns mundane activities, such as working around the house or playing outside, into dramatic adventures. His primary mode of transportation is his Zoopercar, a multi-purpose miniature vehicle he built with his father that can do things like transform into a submarine, an airplane or a helicopter. George often has interesting encounters with animals who, although they don't talk, seem to be able to communicate with George throughout the series. On one occasion, he even encountered a robotic alien that was his own size and helped it get back home.

== Production ==
The show bears a retro-1950s look, with simple animation, character design, and colors, similar to Warner Bros. Animation's Superman: The Animated Series. Primarily jazz is used for background music and music cues, reflecting both his father's occupation as a musician who tinkers with inventing new musical instruments and his mother's style as an avant-garde artist. However, statements made in the characters' dialogue indicate that events take place in the present, or the year that the showing episode was produced and animated.

== Broadcast ==
In Canada, the show aired on CBC, TVO, and YTV. The show premiered on PBS in the United States on September 30, 2000, as a segment on the PBS Kids Bookworm Bunch block. The block was dropped altogether at the end of 2004, but the show was given an individual PBS debut on January 6, 2003, along with Berenstain Bears and Seven Little Monsters.

Internationally, the show aired on ABC Kids in Australia, and on Milkshake! in the United Kingdom.

== Characters ==
=== Main ===
- George Bernard Shrinks (voiced by Tracey Moore) is the 10-year-old titular protagonist of the series, who wakes up from a dream to discover he is extremely small; his golden-plated baby shoes were completely tiny seen in "Round Up the Usual Insects". Because of his small stature, George has had to invent his own adaptive devices, most notably the Zoopercar. Another invention is a system of pneumatic tubes, which George also uses for transportation.
- Harold Shrinks Jr. (referred to as "Junior" in the show or referred to by just the first name "Harold Junior") (voiced by Robbi Jay Thuet) is George's little brother who often accompanies George in his adventures around the house. Junior is George's "sidekick" and "gofer", doing the tasks that are too difficult for George because of the latter's stature. However, his playfulness and his size sometimes lead to unexpected accidents, though Junior's sincere "Sowwy, George", always gets his brother to forgive him.
- Rebecca "Becky" López (voiced by Bryn McAuley) is George's Latina best friend who lives next door. She and George go on many exploits and adventures. Becky is the captain for a Little League ice hockey team called, "The Storks", whose poorly-bad scoring drought was the focus of one of the later episodes.
- Perdita Shrinks (voiced by Kathleen Laskey) is George and Harold Junior's mother, a freelance artist by trade who builds, sculpts and welds with a very abstract style. She is a member of the town's art committee and is very much into healthy foods. She is also very supportive of the projects that the family and kids work on, and enjoys helping out in the community. She also used to be a Radio City Rockette which George reveals his father told him in the episode "If It Ain't Broke".
- Harold Shrinks Sr., sometimes called "Harold", or "Harold Senior", (voiced by Paul O'Sullivan), is George and Junior's father, a musician in a jazz band who is constantly building all kind of accessories and trying out new instruments in the search for the "perfect sound". Harold is a little eccentric, but still loves his family very much and is a good father.

=== Others and one-time characters ===
- Aunt Eunice (voiced by Catherine Gallant) is George and Junior's great-aunt, who sometimes serves them as their babysitter. The first time she saw the boys, she was very patronizing toward George, treating him as though his size were a handicap and "assisting" him. However, Aunt Eunice showed that she changed her ways when George fixed her prized plant, a Bonsai tree that Eunice named "Maurice," which had seemingly been damaged beyond repair. In "Return to Sender," she expresses complete confidence that George will handle himself just fine when he is mailed to different locations across the planet, and that he could mail himself back home safely. She has travelled all over the world; as such, she knows a great deal about different places as well as people. The boys' mother, Perdita Shrinks, is Eunice's niece.
- Sparkle Tangerine is a furry, bright orange stray cat that roams George's neighborhood, also the main antagonist. She often tries to eat George or anyone his size. A similar cat, though unnamed, appeared in the original book by William Joyce. Seen in some episodes: "Can We Keep Him?", "Close Encounters of the Bird Kind", "Zoopercar Caper", "King Kongo", "George vs. the Space Invaders", "Journey to the Centre of the Garden", "Dog-Sitting Miss Daisy", "The George-Lo-Phone", "Return of the Space Invaders", "Small of the Wild", "Hound of the Bath-ervilles", "George Unshrinks", "If I Ran the Circus", "Becky in Wonderland", and "The Lost World of George Shrinks".
- Russell Copeland (voiced by Sean McCann) is a very kindhearted senior who used to live in George's house as a boy. He is also a retired veterinarian.
- Ellen (voiced by Lisa Yamanaka) is a kindhearted Chinese-American girl next door. Despite only appearing in three episodes, Ellen plays a major role in two of them. Ellen is a fan of vintage horror movies and enjoys playing harmless practical jokes. She has an older brother, Matt, who is the owner of an anole lizard named Ting-Ting (which, as Ellen describes, has a literal meaning of "Gracefully Graceful" in the Chinese language). She is left-handed and a member of the Storks, Becky's hockey team, as a forward on the left wing.
- Timmy (voiced by Noah Reid) and Jimmy (voiced by Jamie Haydon-Devlin) Fortevoce are identical twins, members of Becky's hockey team- Jimmy plays centre, and Timmy plays defence. Despite appearing in just two episodes, they still play an important role as supporting members of the cast. In Italian, their last name means "Loud Voice".
- Hilda (voiced by Annick Obonsawin) and Henry (voiced by Noah Reid) Cooper are two blonde-haired, glasses wearing dizygotic fraternal twins/sororal twins. They enjoy playing tricks on one another, such as during a scary movie night at the Shrinks' residence. They are somewhat competitive with each other, but are good friends with George and Becky.
- Helga (voiced by Maryke Hendrikse) is the goaltender for the Storks, Becky's Little League hockey team. She usually wears glasses, except on the ice because the lenses fog up.
- Lizzy (voiced by Tracy Ryan) is a right-wing forward for the Storks, Becky's Little League hockey team. She's skilled at turning on the spot because of her experience figure skating; she joined the hockey team because she thought it was kind of lonely and wanted to join the team.
- Hannah (voiced by Annick Obonsawin) and Hurlden (voiced by Michael Cera) Cadwell appear only in the episode, "Speed Shrinks". These kids are two twins similar to Hilda and Henry, but are somewhat villainous. They build a craft similar to the SR-71 Blackbird and use its special features to destroy and unfairly halt the other racers in order to win.
- Skyler (voiced by Julie Lemieux) is George and Junior's first cousin once removed. Seen only in "Toy George". She is about the same age as Junior and has a similar personality to him. She attended the school play which George was putting on, "Pinocchio".

== Episodes ==
=== Series overview ===
Season	Episodes	Originally released	
Season	Episodes	First released	Last released
1	13	September 30, 2000	December 23, 2000
2	13	September 8, 2001	December 1, 2001
3	14	January 6, 2003	January 23, 2003

=== Season 1 (2000) ===
No. overall	No. in season	Title	Directed by	Written by	Original release date	Prod. code
1	1	"If It Ain't Broke"	Doug Thoms	Pete Sauder	September 30, 2000	101
George and Junior sneak a peek at their mother's surprise to their father, which she didn't want them to do.: First episode in the Shrinks' house.
2	2	"Can We Keep Him?"	Doug Thoms	Pete Sauder	October 7, 2000	102
George finds an injured mouse and decides to help it, which makes Junior jealous.
3	3	"Close Encounters of the Bird Kind"	Doug Thoms	Richard Elliott and Simon Racioppa	October 14, 2000	103
A new kid named Becky arrives, and a bird is unable to get to its home.: First appearance of Becky.
4	4	"Ants in the Pantry"	Doug Thoms	Richard Elliott and Simon Racioppa	October 21, 2000	104
An army of ants threatens to attack the family's picnic and George tries to stop them by himself.
5	5	"Round Up the Usual Insects"	Doug Thoms	Terry Saltsman	October 28, 2000	105
The insects from George and Becky's science project escape.
6	6	"From Bad to Worse"	Doug Thoms	Richard Elliott and Simon Racioppa	November 4, 2000	106
When Aunt Eunice is left to babysit George and Junior, George sets out to prove he can do all the things a regular ten year old boy can do – but not without various mishaps.
7	7	"Sunken Treasures"	Doug Thoms	J.D. Smith	November 11, 2000	107
George searches the pond for a toy that was lost 70 years ago.: The first use of the Zoopersub.
8	8	"Snowman's Land"	Doug Thoms	Richard Elliott and Simon Racioppa	November 18, 2000	108
After a huge snowfall, everyone is having fun but a disappointed Becky, who has the measles and won't be able to make her annual snowman from the first snowfall. George decides to make one for her, but risks being lost in a terrible blizzard.
9	9	"Zoopercar Caper"	Doug Thoms	Jennifer Pertsch	November 25, 2000	109
After the Zoopercar goes missing, George tells the story of how he made it with his father.: This episode includes a flashback in which George remembers how he and his dad built the Zoopercar.
10	10	"Down the Drain"	Doug Thoms	Richard Elliott and Simon Racioppa	December 2, 2000	110
George must venture into the drain pipes to find a ring he was helping his father hide.
11	11	"A Day at the Beach"	Doug Thoms	Jennifer Pertsch	December 9, 2000	111
The Shrinks family spends the day at the beach.
12	12	"King Kongo"	Doug Thoms	Richard Elliott, Simon Racioppa, and J.D. Smith	December 16, 2000	112
A monkey has escaped from the circus. George and Becky decide to cast it in the latter's monster movie after Junior kept getting distracted by cookies, but the monkey might be a bit much for them to handle.
13	13	"George vs. the Space Invaders"	Doug Thoms	J.D. Smith	December 23, 2000	113
George becomes traumatized after watching scary movies, unfortunately some aliens decide to visit, but everyone else doubt their realism.

=== Season 2 (2001) ===
No. overall	No. in season	Title	Directed by	Written by	Original release date	Prod. code
14	1	"The Ghost of Shrinks Manor"	Doug Thoms	Ken Cuperus	September 8, 2001	201
Dad tells a scary story to George and Becky, but strange things begin happening one night and they're convinced a real ghost is about.
15	2	"Journey to the Centre of the Garden"	Doug Thoms	Richard Elliott and Simon Racioppa	September 15, 2001	202
George and Becky are doing a project on beans, but there appears to be something wrong with said project.
16	3	"Dog-Sitting Miss Daisy"	Doug Thoms	Jennifer Pertsch	September 22, 2001	203
George gets a dog as a birthday present for Becky, but the dog is mischievous.
17	4	"Return to Sender"	Doug Thoms	Dave Dias and Kim Thompson	September 29, 2001	204
George is inadvertently mailed around the world.
18	5	"The More Things Change"	Doug Thoms	Richard Elliott and Simon Racioppa	October 6, 2001	205
George and Becky found half a treasure-map that belonged to Russell Copeland, and Russell's friend Edna has the other half. All three set out to find the treasure.
19	6	"The George-Lo-Phone"	Doug Thoms	Ben Joseph	October 13, 2001	206
George desperately wants to be part of the local talent showcase, but Mr. Schnultz won't let him in the band because he is too small. George doesn't give up, and along with Harold, he builds the best instrument ever — the George-lo-phone. Also, George and the rest of the talented Shrinks family give performances no one will soon forget.
20	7	"Down on the Bayou"	Doug Thoms	Jennifer Pertsch	October 20, 2001	207
The family is going camping, and Harold passes down his special compass (which he says was his father's) to George.
21	8	"Tankful of Trouble"	Doug Thoms	Matthew Cope	October 27, 2001	208
George and Becky are raising a frog for a science project; unfortunately the frog was pregnant, then lays eggs, then the kids end up with a frog family.
22	9	"All Along the Clock Tower"	Doug Thoms	Ken Cuperus	November 3, 2001	209
The town-hall's clock-tower is scheduled to be repaired for the town's anniversary, but it's rumored to be cursed. Could it?
23	10	"Return of the Space Invaders"	Doug Thoms	Richard Elliott and Simon Racioppa	November 10, 2001	210
An alien named Manigishi (or Manny for short) crashes on earth and asks George, Junior and their aunt Eunice to help fix it.
24	11	"Small of the Wild"	Brian Lee	Dave Dias	November 17, 2001	211
A snowstorm is approaching, and George and Becky worry that the animals living in their neighborhood won't survive.
25	12	"Speed Shrinks"	Doug Thoms	Scott Kraft	November 24, 2001	212
George races the Zoopercar in an R/C Race.: First appearance of the Fortevoce twins.
26	13	"Hound of the Bath-ervilles"	Brian Lee	Ken Cuperus	December 1, 2001	213
George and Becky decide to be pet-groomers to raise money for an animal-shelter, but one of the dogs they have is a lost one.

=== Season 3 (2003) ===
No. overall	No. in season	Title	Directed by	Written by	Original release date	Prod. code
27	1	"On the Road"	Brian Lee	Jennifer Pertsch	January 6, 2003	301
Harold's band is going on the road and George and the family are tagging along to the snazzy big-city hotel. When a stray pet upsets the chef's dinner plans — and sauce — it's up to George to whip up a solution.
28	2	"A Star is Shrunk"	Doug Thoms and Karen Lessmann	Scott Kraft	January 7, 2003	302
The Shrinks family help make a movie that is filming in their town.
29	3	"George Unshrinks"	Brian Lee	Ken Cuperus	January 8, 2003	303
George, Junior and their father each dream about being a different sizes, only for the dreams to become reality. How will they cope?: Only appearance of George as a normally sized boy (albeit this occurs in a dream).; This is the only episode in which the Zoopercar is driven by someone other than George (Harold).
30	4	"Monster Mash"	Doug Thoms and Karen Lessmann	Jennifer Pertsch	January 9, 2003	304
A new neighbour comes, but most seem to dislike her, despite how helpful she is with George's monster movie marathon.
31	5	"In the Duck Soup"	Brian Lee	Dave Dias	January 10, 2003	305
Junior's toy duck "Wiggy" has broken, but the local toy inventor has his hands full with faulty toy robots who wish to destroy the duck.
32	6	"Friends and Anemones"	Doug Thoms and Karen Lessmann	Ken Cuperus	January 13, 2003	306
During a trip to the aquarium, George must save a family of "Sea Symies.": The title is a pun on the phrase "Friends and Enemies".
33	7	"Coach Shrinks"	Brian Lee	Jennifer Pertsch	January 14, 2003	307
George coaches Becky's hockey team, which has yet to win a single game.: Only appearances of Lizzy, Helga, and the Storks.
34	8	"Migrate-est Adventure"	Karen Lessmann	Ken Cuperus	January 15, 2003	308
The Shrinks family follows a migrating butterfly, participating in a scientific study.
35	9	"George's Apprentice"	Brian Lee	Dave Dias	January 16, 2003	309
George gets a toy robot, but this robot is mischievous.
36	10	"If I Ran the Circus"	Karen Lessmann	Matthew Cope	January 17, 2003	310
The family plan to visit a circus, but a chickenpox infection in Junior might thwart it.
37	11	"Becky in Wonderland"	Brian Lee	Ken Cuperus	January 20, 2003	311
George and Becky read "Alice in Wonderland" and find themselves in a place just like it.
38	12	"Toy George"	Karen Lessmann	Scott Kraft	January 21, 2003	312
George does a play on Pinocchio.
39	13	"The Lost World of George Shrinks"	Brian Lee	Ken Cuperus	January 22, 2003	313
The lizard Ting-Ting, who belongs to Ellen's brother has been accidentally set loose by Ellen and George and has fled to a zoo.
40	14	"Lost and Found Art"	Karen Lessmann	Alice Prodanou	January 23, 2003	314
Perdita loses an art sculpture, which scatter into pieces in the process, George and Becky must save them all before they're recycled.: The series finale.

== Music ==
The theme song, composed by Roberto Occhipinti, in a jumping blues style, is sung by Canadian musician Colin James.

== Home media ==
DVD title	Episode count	Release date	Episodes
Down the Drain	3	February 28, 2006	"Coach Shrinks", "In the Duck Soup", and "The Lost World of George Shrinks"
Ghost Grabber Machine	3	May 9, 2006	"Ghost of Shrinks Manor", "All Along the Clock Tower", and "Journey to the Center of the Garden"
George Vs. Space Invaders	2	May 9, 2006	"George vs. Space Invaders", and "Close Encounters of the Bird Kind"
Speed Shrinks	3	May 9, 2006	"Speed Shrinks", "Hound of the Bath-Ervilles", and "George-Lo-Phone"
King Kongo	2	May 9, 2006	"King Kongo", and "Ants in the Pantry"
Toy George	3	May 9, 2006	"Toy George", "Dog-Sitting Miss Daisy", and "Down on the Bayou"
Snowman's Land	2	November 10, 2009	"Snowman's Land", and "From Bad to Worse"
Zoopercar Caper	2	January 26, 2010	"Zoopercar Caper", and "If It Ain't Broke"
Sunken Treasures	2	March 9, 2010	"Sunken Treasures", and "Can We Keep Him?"
The Lost World of George Shrinks	4		"If I Ran the Circus", "Becky in Wonderland", "Toy George" and "Lost and Found Art"

Treehouse Direct also released the series on YouTube.
