= George and Martha =

Children's book and television series

- Genre: Children's show Comedy
- Based on: Characters by James Marshall
- Directed by: John Van Bruggen; Chris LaBonte; Glen Sylvester
- Voices of: Nathan Lane; Andrea Martin; Sean Cullen; Robin Duke; Kathryn Greenwood; Greg Kramer; Debra McGrath; Colin Mochrie; Tony Rosato; Dwayne Hill
- Theme music composer: Peermusic Canada Inc.
- Opening theme: "Perfidia" by Mambo All-Stars
- Composer: Roberto Occhipinti
- Countries of origin: Canada; China (season 2)
- Original language: English
- No. of seasons: 2
- No. of episodes: 26 (52 segments)

Production
- Executive producers: Patrick Loubert; Michael Hirsh; Clive A. Smith; Maurice Sendak; John B. Carls; James Wang (season 2)
- Production companies: Nelvana Limited; Hong Guang Animation (Suzhou) Co., Ltd. (season 2)

Original release
- Network: HBO Family (United States); YTV (Canada)
- Release: April 1, 1999 – May 1, 2000

George and Martha is a series of children's books written and illustrated by James Marshall between 1972 and 1988. Each book in the series contains five short stories describing interactions between two hippos, George and Martha (named after the married couple in Edward Albee's play Who's Afraid of Virginia Woolf). The books inspired an animated children's television series by Nelvana which comprised 26 episodes made in 1999, and a musical made in 2011.

== Plot ==
The books have a slice of life depiction of the everyday life of best friends George and Martha. Their regular activities include taking dance classes, going to the beach and the amusement park, and playing practical jokes on each other. In a humorous way, the series teaches about friendship. George and Martha sometimes argue, but always make up.

== Books ==
The George and Martha books comprise the following titles:

- George and Martha (1972)
- George and Martha Encore (1973)
- George and Martha Rise and Shine (1976)
- George and Martha One Fine Day (1978)
- George and Martha Tons of Fun (1980)
- George and Martha Back in Town (1984)
- George and Martha Round and Round (1988)
- George and Martha: The Complete Stories of Two Best Friends, with a foreword by Maurice Sendak (1997)

== Television ==
=== Cast ===
- Nathan Lane as George Hippo
- Andrea Martin as Martha Hippo
- Kathryn Greenwood as Frieda
- Colin Mochrie as Oscar, Bud Chuckles
- Debra McGrath as Valerie Chuckles
- Sean Cullen as Wilde, Eton
- Robin Duke as Penny
- Tony Rosato as Duke
- Greg Kramer as Anton

=== Production ===
The series was animated and co-produced by Canada-based studio Nelvana Limited and Wild Things Enterprises Inc. The series has 26 episodes (with 52 segments) in order.

The series' theme song is "Perfidia", by Mambo All-Stars.

=== Episodes ===
==== Season 1 (1999) ====
| No. overall | No. in season | Title | Written by | Original release date |
|---|---|---|---|---|
| 1 | 1 | "The Dance Recital" / "The Tooth" | Barry Julien | April 1, 1999 |
| 2 | 2 | "The Snoop" / "A Day at the Beach" | Barry Julien | April 2, 1999 |
| 3 | 3 | "The Scary Movie" / "The Book" | Jenni Konner & Alexandra Rushfield | April 3, 1999 |
| 4 | 4 | "The French Lesson" / "The Big Scare" | Michael Thoma / Joseph Mallozzi | April 4, 1999 |
| 5 | 5 | "The Mirror" / "The Special Gifts" | Barry Julien | April 25, 1999 |
| 6 | 6 | "The Picnic" / "The Trickster" | Michael Thoma / Joseph Mallozzi | May 2, 1999 |
| 7 | 7 | "The Trip" / "The Experiment" | Barry Julien / Heidi Foss | May 9, 1999 |
| 8 | 8 | "The Triple Dare" / "The Icky Story" | Barry Julien / Heidi Foss | May 16, 1999 |
| 9 | 9 | "The Garden" / "Split Pea Soup" | Harris Goldberg | May 23, 1999 |
| 10 | 10 | "Baby Doll" / "The Acting Class" | Jenni Konner & Alexandra Rushfield | May 30, 1999 |
| 11 | 11 | "The Comedian" / "The Prize" | Barry Julien | June 6, 1999 |
| 12 | 12 | "The Misunderstanding" / "The Secret Club" | Joseph Mallozzi | June 13, 1999 |
| 13 | 13 | "The Hypnotist" / "The Sweet Tooth" | Richard Liebmann-Smith | June 20, 1999 |

==== Season 2 (2000) ====
| No. overall | No. in season | Title | Written by | Original release date |
|---|---|---|---|---|
| 14 | 1 | "The Cold" / "The Campout" | Kim Thompson / Barry Julien | February 19, 2000 |
| 15 | 2 | "The Reader" / "The Decorator" | Joseph Mallozzi | February 20, 2000 |
| 16 | 3 | "The Badminton Tournament" / "The Caddy" | Jennifer Pertsch / S.M. Molitor | February 26, 2000 |
| 17 | 4 | "The Roller Derby" / "The Spa" | Barry Julien / Joseph Mallozzi | February 27, 2000 |
| 18 | 5 | "The Argument" / "Happy Palms' Finest" | Joseph Mallozzi / Jennifer Pertsch | March 5, 2000 |
| 19 | 6 | "The Flying Donut" / "Martha's Cousin" | S.M. Molitor / Nancy Barr | March 12, 2000 |
| 20 | 7 | "The Big Splash" / "My Stars!" | Paul Mullie / Kim Thompson | March 19, 2000 |
| 21 | 8 | "The Blabbermouth" / "Life and Breath" | Barry Julien / Ian Weir | April 1, 2000 |
| 22 | 9 | "The Best Friends Show" / "The Sleepwalker" | Joseph Mallozzi / Jennifer Pertsch | April 8, 2000 |
| 23 | 10 | "Funny Business" / "The Tease" | Jennifer Pertsch / Joseph Mallozzi | April 15, 2000 |
| 24 | 11 | "The Play's The Thing" / "The Sore Loser" | Ian Weir / Jennifer Pertsch | April 22, 2000 |
| 25 | 12 | "The Costumed Duo" / "Temper Temper" | S.M. Molitor / Dave Dias | April 29, 2000 |
| 26 | 13 | "The Fibber" / "The Mascot" | Tom Nursall / Barry Julien & Jennifer Pertsch | May 1, 2000 |

=== Telecast and home media ===
The series initially seen on YTV in Canada. In the U.S., the series aired on HBO Family, premiering on April 1, 1999. Repeats of the series started airing on the channel until 2009. The series returned to Qubo on March 28, 2016. Select episodes of the series were released on VHS by Sony Wonder, under their "Doors of Wonder" banner. As of 2017, YouTube's channel Treehouse Direct uploaded all the episodes of the series.

== Musical ==
George and Martha was turned into an original musical, George and Martha: Tons of Fun, by Imagination Stage in Bethesda, Maryland in 2011. It featured music, books, and lyrics by Joan Cushing and was directed by Kathryn Chase Bryer.
