= Paul O'Sullivan (actor) =

Canadian actor (1964–2012)

- Born: April 4, 1964; Canada
- Died: May 18, 2012 (aged 48); Peterborough, Ontario, Canada
- Occupation: Actor
- Years active: 1984–2012
- Partner: Linda Kash (1994–2012; his death)
- Children: 3

Paul O'Sullivan (April 4, 1964 – May 18, 2012) was a Canadian comedy actor.

Originally associated with The Second City's Toronto troupe, O'Sullivan acted both on stage and in television shows such as George Shrinks, Friends and Heroes, Grossology and Getting Along Famously, as well as in guest roles on The Red Green Show, Murdoch Mysteries, Dan for Mayor and Little Mosque on the Prairie. He previously taught for Humber College's Comedy Writing and Performance program in Toronto, Canada.

== Personal life ==
His partner was actress Linda Kash, with whom O'Sullivan had three daughters; they lived on a farm outside Peterborough, Ontario.

== Death ==
O'Sullivan died in a car accident near Peterborough on May 18, 2012, at approximately 2:30 p.m. local time. His car left the road, crossed the shoulder, and struck a parked flatbed truck. O'Sullivan was only 48 years old.

== Filmography ==
=== Film ===
Year	Title	Role	Notes
1995	Memory Run	Video Operator	Video
1995	It Takes Two	Bernard Louffier	
1998	Jerry and Tom	Roebuck's Friend	
1998	Dirty Work	A.D.	
2000	The Spreading Ground	Ben Scattergood	
2003	Luck	Bartender	
2009	Zombie Dearest	Mr. Roeder	
2010	Score: A Hockey Musical	Doctor	
2012	Flutter	Doctor	Short film

=== Television ===
Year	Title	Role	Notes
1984	Hangin' In	Zolon	Episode: "The Peace Pill"
1994	Forever Knight	Paul Blondell	Episode: "Forward Into the Past"
1994	Side Effects	John Huey	Episode: "The Last Rights"
1996	One Minute to Air		TV series
1996	Due South	Parking Attendant	Episode: "The Promise"
1996	A Holiday to Love	Ed	TV film
1997	The Red Green Show	Sparky Hoover	Episode: "Big Guy Little Guy"
1997	The Newsroom		Episode: "The Campaign"
1998	Nothing Too Good for a Cowboy	Stock Agent	TV film
1998	Improv Heaven and Hell		
1998	Comedy Now!	Various	Episode: "Skippy's Rangers: The Show They Never Gave"
1998	Once a Thief	Langham	Episode: "True Blue"
1998	SketchCom		Episode: "Fast & Dirty & Skippy's Rangers"
2000–2003	George Shrinks	Harold Shrinks (voice)	Main role (40 episodes)
2001	Club Land	Simon Says	TV film
2002	An American in Canada	Roy	Episode: "Pilot"
2002	Puppets Who Kill	Button's Lawyer	Episode: "Buttons Goes to Court"
2003	The Joe Blow Show	Armond	TV special
2003	Moville Mysteries	Mr. Esquito (voice)	Episode: "The Night and Day and Night of the Hunter"
2003	The Seán Cullen Show	Cardinal	Episode: "Kissing a Nun"
2004	The Bobroom	Various	TV series
2005	Burnt Toast	Richie	TV film
2006	Getting Along Famously	Beverly	Supporting role (6 episodes)
2006–2008	Grossology	The Director (voice)	Main role (30 episodes)
2007	6teen	Eddie (voice)	Episode: "The Journal"
2008–2009	Friends and Heroes	Marcus (voice)	Recurring role (13 episodes)
2008–2009	Best Ed	Eugene Tuttle (voice)	TV series
2009	Murdoch Mysteries	Man with cart	Episode: "Big Murderer on Campus"
2011	The Cat in the Hat Knows a Lot About That!	Whiffy (voice)	Episode: "Sniff and Seek/Aye Aye!"
2011	Dan for Mayor	Radio Host	Episode: "Porktoberfest"
2012	Little Mosque on the Prairie	Harry	Episode: "The Dating Game"

== Awards and nominations ==
Awards
Year	Award	Category	Production	Result
2000	Canadian Comedy Awards	Television – Writing – Episode or Special	Comedy Now! ("The Show They Never Gave")	Nominated
2004	Gemini	Best Ensemble Performance in a Comedy Program or Series	The Joe Blow Show	Nominated
2009	Gemini	Best Individual or Ensemble Performance in an Animated Program or Series	Grossology	Nominated
