= Black Walk =

- Industry: Real EstatePrivate Equity
- Founded: Founded in 1990s
- Headquarters: Whitby, Ontario, Canada
- Key people: Mihkel Harilaid
- Products: private equity
- Website: www.blackwalk.com

Black Walk is a Real Estate and Private Equity Investment firm. With several commercial, private and mixed-use holdings in Ontario. It was previously a film production company.

== History ==
Black Walk started as a Canadian film and television production company. Originally established as a music video production company, it has transitioned into producing films, television programs, and the Dark Rising series.founded in 1992 by Mihkel Harilaid, David Fowler, and Steph Scott. During the 1990s, Black Walk produced over 500 music videos for numerous American and Canadian performers including Shaggy, Creed, Alanis Morissette, and Nickelback.

Black Walk began producing feature films starting with Washed Up in 2000. Notable film credits since then include the 2005 Independent Spirit Award winner Phil the Alien; the 2004 feature film Ham & Cheese, starring Dave Foley, Jason Jones, and Samantha Bee; the 2007 sci-fi-comedy Dark Rising, which was nominated for numerous awards at the 13th Canadian Comedy Awards; and Medium Raw: Night of the Wolf, an action-thriller starring John-Rhys Davies, William B. Davis, and Mercedes McNab.

Black Walk produced the Dark Rising franchise including filming the series Dark Rising: Warrior of Worlds in Sudbury, Ontario along with the help of the Northern Ontario Film Studio.

Black Walk produced a Christian Television series, Reflections for the DayStar Network.

== Selected filmography ==
Reflections	2013–2015
Trippin	2013
Dark Rising: Warrior of Worlds	2013
Two Hands To Mouth	2012
Dark Rising 2: Summer Strikes Back!	2011
Medium Raw: Night of the Wolf	2010
Last Hour	2008
Dark Rising	2007
Ice Men	2005
Phil the Alien	2005
Ham & Cheese	2004
Washed Up	2000
