= Mihkel Harilaid =

Canadian film producer

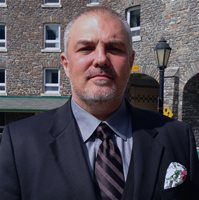
- Born: 1966 (age 59–60); Ontario, Canada
- Occupations: CEO and Executive Producer of Black Walk
- Years active: 1992–present

Mihkel Harilaid, also known as Mike Harilaid, is the CEO and executive producer of Black Walk, a Canadian feature film and television production company.

== Career ==
Harilaid began his career in real estate development and management and in 1992 founded Black Walk Corporation, a Canadian film and television production company, with David Fowler and Stephen Scott. He became and remains the CEO and Executive Producer for the company.

Starting his production career in music videos, Harilaid produced over 500 clips. Harilaid and Black Walk worked with Alanis Morissette, Hootie & the Blowfish, and Shaggy.

Harilaid decided to shift the focus of Black Walk to feature films. In 2002 he released his second feature film Ham & Cheese. This was followed with Phil the Alien, premiering at the Toronto International Film Festival. Harilaid executive produced Two Hands to Mouth, his second feature with Director Michael DeCarlo, which premiered at the Madrid International Film Festival.

Dark Rising: Warrior of Worlds, a continuation of the Dark Rising franchise, was aired on Super Channel in the summer of 2014. Written by Harilaid and Andrew Cymek, the project was produced by Craig Fleming and stars Brigitte Kingsley and Jacob Blair.

In recent years, Mihkel has expanded Black Walk's production slate to include lifestyle television. This includes a destination fishing series, Hookin’ Up with Nick and Mariko and Reflections, a long-standing Christian television series.

=== Credits ===
Harilaid 's producer credits include:

- Over 500 Music Videos
- Reflections A Christian series for the DayStar Network featuring the Work of God.
- Dark Rising: Warrior of Worlds Written by Mihkel Harilaid and Andrew Cymek, Directed by Andrew Cymek, and featuring Brigitte Kingsley, Nug Nahrgang, and Jacob Blair.
- Hookin' Up with Nick and Mariko A World Fishing Network series following Nick Honachefsky and Mariko Izumi as they travel on a mission for fishin' and a ton of fun.
- Two Hands to Mouth Written and Directed by Michael DeCarlo and featuring Art Hindle, Richard Zeppieri, Vincent Walsh, and Kate Trotter.
- Medium Raw: Night of the Wolf Directed by Andrew Cymek and featuring John Rhys-Davies, Mercedes McNab and William B. Davis
- Suck Directed by Rob Stefaniuk and featuring Jessica Paré, Moby, Alice Cooper, Iggy Pop, Dave Foley and Malcolm McDowell.
- Dark Rising, Summer Strikes Back and The Savage Tales of Summer Vale starring Brigitte Kingsley and Jay Reso
- Ham & Cheese Directed by Warren P. Sonoda and starring Mike Beaver, Jason Jones and Samantha Bee.
- Phil the Alien Directed by Rob Stefaniuk', with Oscar-nominated Graham Greene and winner of the 2005 Toronto International Film Festival Independent Spirit Award winner.
- Last Hour directed by Pascal Caubet and starring DMX, Michael Madsen, David Carradine, and Paul Sorvino.

== Personal life ==
Harilaid's surname is derived from his family's ancestral home in Harilaid, Estonia.

Mihkel lives in Pickering, Ontario with his children and Cat, Big Tuna Harilaid

Harilaid started his education at Trinity College School, where he graduated in 1985.

He served as chairman of the TCS Alumni Association. He then went to Trinity College at the University of Toronto where he received a BA in History in 1989. He later became a Certified Property Manager with the Institute of Real Estate Management and his FPI and CRF from the Real Estate Institute of Canada (REIC).

== Electoral results ==
2011 Canadian federal election: Ajax—Pickering
Party	Candidate	Votes	%	±%	Expenditures
Conservative	Chris Alexander	24,797	44.07	+6.12	
Liberal	Mark Holland	21,569	38.33	-6.20	
New Democratic	Jim Koppens	8,284	14.72	+5.64	
Green	Mihkel Harilaid	1,621	2.88	-4.40	
United	Bob Kesic	72	0.13	–	
Total valid votes/expense limit		56,268	100.00		
Total rejected ballots		187	0.33	-0.05	
Turnout		56,455	61.22		
Conservative gain from Liberal		Swing		+6.16	
