= Kathleen Laskey =

Canadian actress

- Occupation: Actress
- Years active: 1982–present
- Spouse: Jeff Pustil (m. 1990)

Kathleen Laskey, sometimes credited as Kathy Laskey, is a Canadian actress. An alumna of The Second City's Toronto troupe, she is most commonly but not exclusively associated with comedic and voice roles. She also voiced Squeak the Mouse on the children's TV show, Peep and the Big Wide World.

She has been married since 1990 to her former Check It Out! castmate Jeff Pustil.

== Filmography ==
Year	Title	Role	Notes
1982–1984	SCTV	Guest roles	
1985–1988	Check It Out!	Marlene	66 episodes
1988	Street Legal	Sidney	5 episodes
1989	In Opposition	Karen Collier	
1990	Little Rosey	Little Rosey (voice)	2 episodes
1990	Edsville	Paula	Short film
1994	Getting Gotti	Cassie	TV movie
1995	Sailor Moon	Berthier/Bertie, Plant Sisters (voice)	19 episodes
2002	Cyberchase	Harriet Hippo (voice)	1 episode
2000–2003	George Shrinks	Perdita Shrinks (voice)	40 episodes
2001–2004	Blue Murder	Roberta Thorpe	
2002–2003	Moville Mysteries	Mrs. Kornbuckle/Victor's mother (voice)	
2002–2005	The Eleventh Hour	Joyce Lemsky	
2003–2004	My Dad the Rock Star	Crystal Zilla (voice)	26 episodes
2004–2007	Peep and the Big Wide World	Squeak, Beaver Mom, Female Blue Jay, Additional roles	3 episodes
2004–2008	6teen	Yummy Mummy (voice)	4 episodes
2005–2006	Carl²	Janet Crashman (voice)	9 episodes
2005–2006	Totally Spies!	Geraldine Husk (voice)	3 episodes
2006–2008	Yin Yang Yo!	Edna (voice)	6 episodes
2007–2008	Wayside	Mrs. Jewls (voice)	8 episodes
2008	Hank and Mike	Connie Schytt	
2008	ReGenesis	Dr. Ruth Bruen	2 episodes
2008–2009	Best Ed	Other voices	26 episodes
2009–2010	The Dating Guy	Denise Feltcher	10 episodes
2009–2011	Being Erica	Barb Strange	49 episodes
2012	Lost Girl	Tulip	1 episode
2014	The Good Witch's Wonder	Beverly	TV movie
2014	One Starry Christmas	Betsy Jensen	TV movie
2015	Saving Hope	Betty	1 episode
2017	The Christmas Cure	Martha Turner	TV movie
2021	The Enchanted Christmas Cake	Estelle	TV movie
2021	Christmas in Washington	Amanda Barnes	TV movie
2022	Big Blue	Phil’s Mom (voice)	1 episode
2022	I'm Glad It's Christmas	Cassandra Rogers	TV movie
2023	A Harvest Homecoming	Susan	TV movie
2023	Our Christmas Mural	Betty	TV movie
2025	A Change in Heart	Sandra	TV movie
2025	The Z-Suite	Psychiatrist / Therapist	1 episode
