= In Opposition =

Canadian television sitcom

- Written by: Dawn Ritchie
- Starring: Kathleen Laskey; Damir Andrei; Jennifer Dale; Lawrence Dane
- Country of origin: Canada
- Original language: English
- No. of seasons: 1
- No. of episodes: 6

Production
- Running time: 30 minutes

Original release
- Network: CBC Television
- Release: 24 October – 1 December 1989

In Opposition is a Canadian television sitcom that aired on CBC Television in 1989. The show lasted only a single season.

It starred Kathleen Laskey as Karen Collier, a rookie Member of Parliament who represented the fictional riding of Moncton—Macquedewawa for the also-fictional Dominion Party of Canada. The show also starred Judy Marshak as her secretary Grace Kiley, Lawrence Dane as her party leader Joe Reynolds, Damir Andrei as her caucus colleague McGillivray, Peter Keleghan as backroom organizer Tom Sheridan, and Jennifer Dale as her neighbour and friend Mary Margaret McCarthy.

The show's pilot had to be refilmed, after the role of Tom Sheridan, originally played by David McIlwraith, was recast.

The show was the CBC's second unsuccessful attempt to create a politically themed sitcom, following 1987's Not My Department. Six episodes were produced and aired.
