= Angelina Love =

Canadian professional wrestler (born 1981)

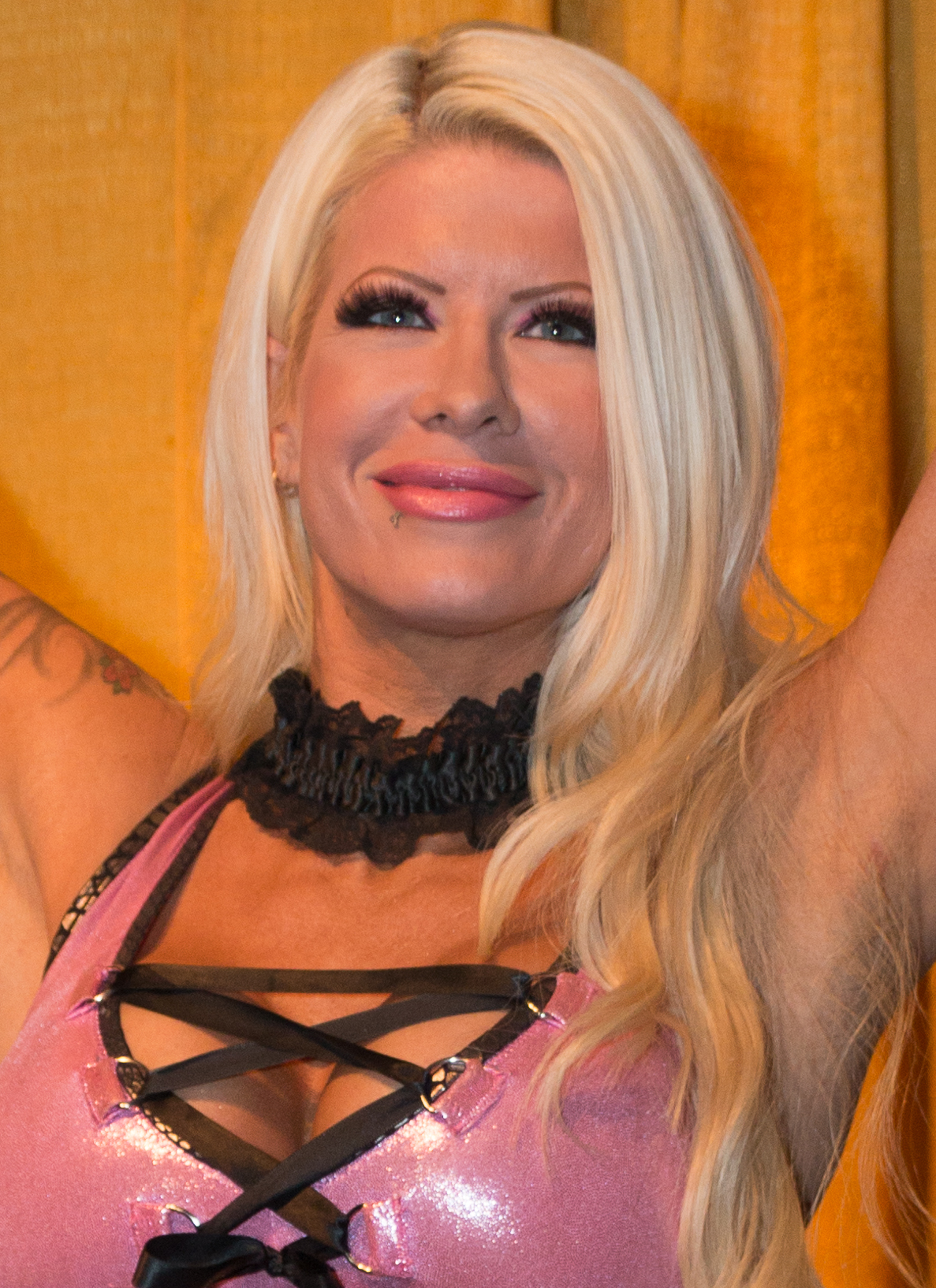
- Love in 2014

Personal information
- Born: Lauren Williams; September 13, 1981 (age 44) Toronto, Ontario, Canada
- Spouses: Davey Richards (m. 2015; div. 2017) Merton Woolard (m. 2023)
- Children: 1

Professional wrestling career
- Ring name(s): Angelina Love; Angel Williams; Canadian Angel
- Billed height: 5 ft 6 in (1.68 m)
- Billed weight: 122 lb (55 kg)
- Billed from: Toronto, Ontario, Canada
- Trained by: Rob Etcheverria
- Debut: August 18, 2000

Lauren Woolard (née Williams; born September 13, 1981) is a Canadian professional wrestler. She is best known for her time in TNA Wrestling under the ring name Angelina Love as part of the stable The Beautiful People. She is signed with the National Wrestling Alliance (NWA).

Between ROH and TNA, Love is a seven-time women's world champion, having held TNA Knockouts Championship six times, along with her one-time reign as TNA Knockouts Tag Team Champion with Winter. She was also a one-time Women of Honor World Champion while in Ring of Honor (ROH).

== Professional wrestling career ==
=== Early career (2000–2004) ===
She debuted in wrestling on February 29, 2000, in Hardcore Wrestling Federation in Ontario, Canada, and she wrestled in various independent promotions around Canada under the ring name Angel Williams. Her all-time favorite wrestler Shawn Michaels was her inspiration to get into wrestling. She was first a valet for various wrestlers such as Chris Sabin and Eric Young, and then began in-ring training under Rob Fuego.

=== Total Nonstop Action Wrestling (2004) ===
Williams briefly worked for Total Nonstop Action Wrestling (TNA) in 2004, mainly wrestling on TNA Xplosion against Trinity.

=== World Wrestling Entertainment (2004–2007) ===
==== Deep South Wrestling (2004–2007) ====
Williams was working for promotions in the United States when World Wrestling Entertainment (WWE) scouted her, and invited her to a tryout in June 2004. In November, she trained at WWE's then-developmental territory Ohio Valley Wrestling (OVW), and WWE signed her to a contract in late 2004. She was assigned to wrestle and train in another WWE developmental territory, Deep South Wrestling (DSW). Williams began managing Johnny Parisi in the summer of 2005. On the September 8, 2005, episode of DSW TV, Williams made her in-ring debut by defeating Michelle McCool. On September 22, Williams was scheduled to wrestle against McCool, but MCcool never showed up. Instead Daisy Mae came out, challenged Williams and Williams defeated Mae in a singles match. At the February 9, 2006, episode of DSW TV, Williams participated in the first ever Bikini Contest in DSW. She did not reveal her bikini because Palmer Cannon interrupted, which led to a match, where Love managed Cannon against Tommy Dreamer. On February 28, she underwent knee surgery in Birmingham, Alabama, to repair a torn ACL. After almost seven months of rehab, she stepped back into the ring at a DSW TV taping. At the beginning of November 2006, Williams started managing The Gymini, but The Gymini were released from their contracts in January 2007.

Williams then began a feud with General Manager of DSW, Krissy Vaine, with Williams claiming that Vaine did something immoral to be appointed General Manager. Over the next couple of weeks, Vaine would cost Williams her matches by forcing other DSW Divas into interfering in Williams's matches. On the January 4 episode of DSW TV, Williams defeated the debuting Brooke Adams, with Vaine on commentary. On the January 11 episode of DSW TV', Williams competed against Shantelle Taylor in a losing effort. On the January 18 episode of DSW TV, Williams teamed up with Shantelle in a winning effort, defeating Luscious and Tracy Taylor in a tag-team match. On the February 8 episode of DSW TV, Williams defeated Krissy Vaine by disqualification after The Bag Lady attacked Williams. Immediately following the match, Vaine ordered the match to restart, resulting in Vaine pinning Williams. The following week, Williams got a measure of revenge by defeating The Bag Lady. On the April 5, 2007, episode of DSW TV, Williams accompanied Vaine to a match, where she defeated Nattie Neidhart after interference from Williams. Over the following weeks, Williams teamed up with Vaine against Neidhart and Shantelle Taylor, losing to them on several occasions. The storyline, however, came to an end when Deep South Wrestling shut down in April.

==== Ohio Valley Wrestling (2007) ====
After DSW shut down, Williams was moved to Ohio Valley Wrestling. Williams made her OVW debut in a dark match at the May 16, 2007, television tapings in Louisville, Kentucky, defeating Serena. Two days later, Williams was released from her developmental contract.

=== Independent circuit (2007–2014) ===
After being released from WWE, Williams resurfaced in Mexican promotion AAA, under the name Canadian Angel on June 10, 2007. She also appeared for other independent promotions such as NWA: Extreme Canadian Championship Wrestling and Full Throttle Wrestling.

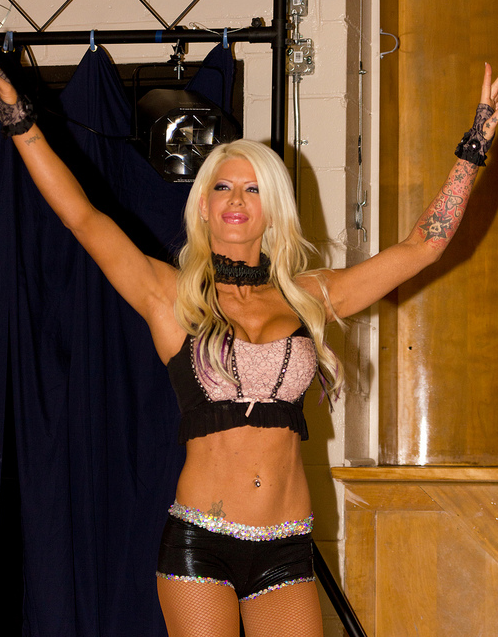
Love in July 2011

Love made her debut for Great Canadian Wrestling (GCW) on December 27, 2011, at the Season's Beatings event in Oshawa, Ontario, Canada, where she teamed up with Shawn Spears in a losing effort to Seleziya Sparx and Brent Banks in a mixed-tag-team match. Love made her debut for Indian promotion Ring Ka King on March 18, 2012, where she defeated Alissa Flash. After the match, Love began a storyline in which she was being pursued by Romeo and Zoravar. On the April 4 episode of Ring Ka King, Love defeated Raisha and Alissa Flash in a triple-treat match. Following the match, Romeo came to the ring with a gift for Love, but Zoravar would out-do Romeo by giving Love jewelry and a car. On the April 14 episode of Ring Ka King, Love defeated Raisha in a singles match. Following the match, Zoravar confessed that he was in love with Love. On September 22, 2012, during her time with TNA, Love and Velvet Sky reunited as The Beautiful People at a Northeast Wrestling event, where they were defeated by Madison Rayne and Rosita.

Love made her debut for Family Wrestling Entertainment (FWE) on October 4, 2012, at the Back 2 Brooklyn internet pay-per-view, where she teamed up with Velvet Sky to defeat the FWE Women's Champion Maria Kanellis and Katrina Lea in a tag team match, with Love pinning Kanellis. Because of the win, Williams was named number one contender, and faced Kanellis for the FWE Women's Championship on February 16, 2013, but was unsuccessful in winning the championship after Mike Bennett helped Maria take advantage. On November 10, Love made her debut for Pro-Wrestling: EVE in Sudbury, Suffolk, England, defeating Carmel Jacob by disqualification, following interference from Sara-Marie Taylor. Love then teamed with Erin Angel in a tag team match, where they were defeated by Jacob and Taylor. On February 16, 2013, at FWE No Limits, Love was defeated by the FWE Women's Champion Maria Kanellis in a title match. Love returned to FWE at their Openweight Grand Prix on October 12, defeating Cheerleader Melissa and Serena Deeb in a three-way match, when she pinned Deeb.

On February 22, 2013, Daffney announced that Love would be making her debut in the all-female promotion Shine Wrestling, at the event Shine 8. At Shine 8 on March 23, Love teamed up with Mia Yim, Amazing Kong and Christina Von Eerie in a losing effort to the team of Valkyrie (Allysin Kay, Ivelisse, Rain and Taylor Made). On April 19, at the Shine 9 event, Love competed in the Shine Championship qualifying tournament, losing to Rain. On May 24 at the Shine 10 event, Love was unsuccessful in winning the Shine Championship from the reigning champion Rain. Love returned on January 24 at the Shine 14 event, where she defeated Leah von Dutch.

=== Lucha Libre AAA Worldwide (2007; 2011) ===
In June 2007 Williams made several appearances for Mexican promotion Lucha Libre AAA Worldwide as a member of La Legión Extranjera (Foreign Legion) under the ring name Canadian Angel.

She returned to the promotion on June 18, 2011, at Triplemanía XIX, where she teamed with Mickie James, Sexy Star and Velvet Sky to defeat Cynthia Moreno, Faby Apache, Mari Apache and Lolita in an eight-woman tag team match.

=== Return to TNA (2007–2009) ===
==== The Beautiful People (2007–2009) ====
In September 2007, she was contacted again by TNA to appear at their annual pay-per-view Bound for Glory, which was confirmed on the October 9 episode of TNA Today where she was interviewed by Jeremy Borash. At Bound For Glory, Williams participated in a 10 wrestler Gauntlet to crown the first TNA Women's Champion. During the match, she was eliminated by Gail Kim and ODB, and the match was won in the end by Kim. At the Genesis pay-per-view, Williams unsuccessfully challenged for the Knockouts Championship in a fatal-four-way with Gail Kim retaining her title.

Williams soon began competing under the ring name "Angelina Love" and formed a partnership with Velvet Sky, calling themselves "Velvet-Love Entertainment", later changed to "The Beautiful People". The duo defeated ODB and Roxxi Laveaux at Turning Point in a Tag Team match. During the following months, Love and Sky also aided Gail Kim in her rivalry with Awesome Kong. Love and Sky became villains on the March 13, 2008, episode of Impact by attacking Laveaux. Love also participated at Lockdown in the first ever "Queen of the Cage" match but was pinned by Laveaux.

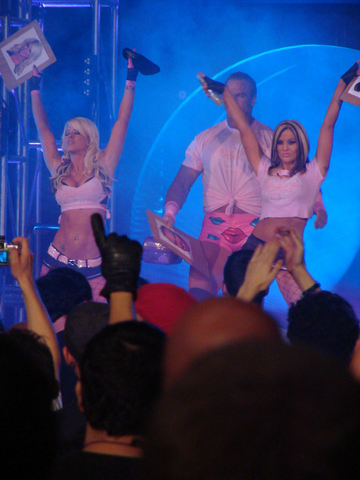
The Beautiful People (Love and Velvet Sky) with Cute Kip

Adopting the personas of superficial prima donnas, who loathe and insult anyone they consider to be physically unattractive, they dropped the Velvet-Love Entertainment moniker and became The Beautiful People. In 2008 at Lockdown, they participated in the first ever "Queen of the Cage" match, which was won by Roxxi, when she defeated Love in the finals. The following month's pay-per-view, Sacrifice, saw a Battle Royal where the last two in the ring competed in a Ladder match with the loser having their head shaved; the week before on Impact! Gail Kim won immunity in a Shears-On-A-Pole-Match. The Makeover Battle Royal-Ladder Match saw Kim and Roxxi survive the Battle Royal and with Kim having immunity this meant the third runner-up, Angelina Love, would have her head shaved if Roxxi won. Knowing this, Love interfered in the Ladder Match to ensure Kim's victory and Roxxi's head being shaved bald. While the performers watched the haircut in pity, Love and Sky paraded around celebrating with Roxxi's freshly shaved hair cementing them as villains in one of TNA's most controversial moments.

The Beautiful People continued to harass the fan favorites, including ruining Kim's chance at winning the TNA Women's Knockout Championship, injuring her, and unsuccessfully attempting to shave ODB's head after a match. This led to a Street Fight on June 5 between Sky and ODB, during which Mickie Knuckles (later renamed Moose) debuted as The Beautiful People's ally on Impact!. At Slammiversary the new trio lost in a six-woman tag team match against Roxxi, ODB and Kim when ODB pinned Moose.

On July 18, Sky won a ten-wrestler Battle Royal to earn a shot at the Knockouts Championship. However, she failed to win the match, afterwards her and Love assaulted champion Taylor Wilde, putting a paper bag over her head. Their bad luck continued when The Beautiful People main evented the July 31 Impact! in a losing effort to Wilde and Kim.

On the edition of August 14 of Impact!, Kip James was introduced as the team's "fashionist" under the name Cute Kip. As Sky had failed to win the title from Wilde, Love was given a chance at No Surrender. The following week on Impact!, The Beautiful People tried to intimidate Wilde before No Surrender, by attacking her backstage. Love and Wilde competed in a beauty pageant which Love lost after losing the evening gown and talent contest segments. Love also lost the title match at No Surrender. While Sky and Love had been focussing on Wilde and her title, Kip had begun a feud with Rhino. This feud ended in defeat for the Beautiful People, with them losing to ODB, Rhaka Khan and Rhino at Bound for Glory IV. Their feud with ODB spilled out into an alliance with Booker T who hired The Beautiful People to protect his wife, Sharmell, from ODB in exchange for his locker room on the December 4 episode of Impact!. This resulted in a six-woman tag team match at Final Resolution against ODB, Wilde and Roxxi, which they lost.

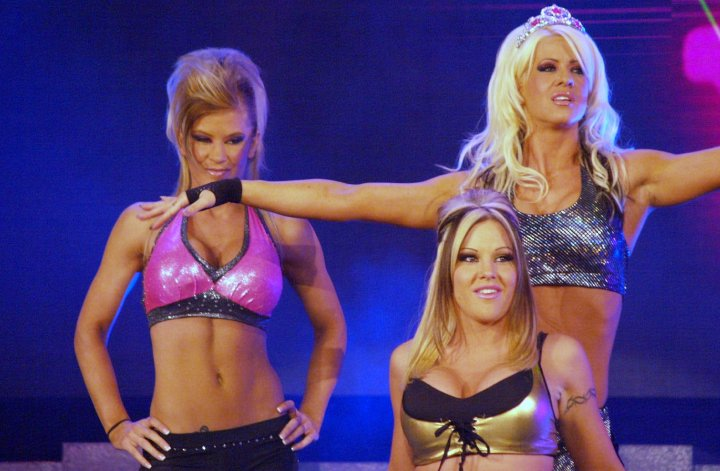
Madison Rayne (left) joined in March 2009 to make the sorority Mi∇⦵ (Mi Pi Sexy)

Also in December it was announced on TNA's website that the company had extended an invitation to United States Vice-Presidential candidate Sarah Palin which The Beautiful People looked forward to as they considered her husband to be attractive. A Governor Palin parody character, often referred to simply as The Governor, appeared on December 4 played by Shannon Spruill. Love and Sky were oblivious to The Governor being an imposter, resulting in some comedy skits where Kip tried to convince them they were being fooled while others mocked their stupidity. The Governor, meanwhile, convinced the duo that they would have a makeover that would make them worthy of her cabinet; the makeover involved frumpy clothes, no make-up and unstyled hair. On January 15, Taylor Wilde and Roxxi revealed that it had all been a ruse to humiliate The Beautiful People who, in Wilde's opinion, were making a mockery of TNA's women's division. After this they had mud dropped on them from the ceiling. The following week, The Beautiful People brutally attacked Spruill backstage until Kip stopped them after a sufficient beating. On February 5, The Beautiful People exacted revenge on Roxxi and Wilde in a tag match and put paper bags over their heads; however, their revenge was cut short when The Governor made the save.

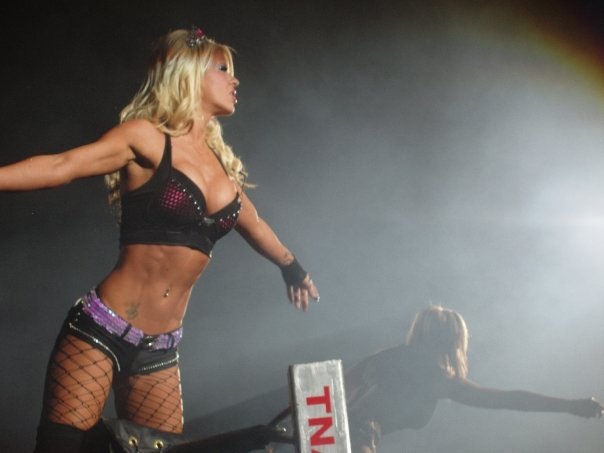
Love in April 2009

Wilde's rivalry with The Beautiful People continued when Wilde teamed with the recently debuted Madison Rayne on February 26. Rayne turned on Wilde in the tag team match giving The Beautiful People the win. With Rayne's help, The Beautiful People won a Four Corners Tag Team match against Awesome Kong and Raisha Saeed, Rhaka Khan and Sojourner Bolt, and Wilde and Roxxi. On the edition of March 12 of Impact!, Madison Rayne was formally revealed as an initiate to Mi Pi Sexy (Mi∇⦵) (the newly formed sorority of the group). However, Rayne lost her initiation match to Taylor Wilde. Love and Sky continued to be referred to as "The Beautiful People", but when Rayne accompanied them, they were referred to as "Mi Pi Sexy". Sometime later, the term "Mi Pi Sexy" became a nickname, thus being used occasionally on television.

The Beautiful People began the hazing of Madison Rayne on March 19's Impact, which began with her helping them clip The Governor's hair after Rayne lost her match. Mi Pi Sexy would fight against Wilde, Roxxi, and The Governor at Destination X. Despite the numbers being even with the acquisition of Rayne, The Beautiful People failed to defeat their opponents. Monty Sopp, who played Cute Kip, was removed from television prior to Destination X to become a road agent, meaning his departure from the stable. This was explained on-screen by Sky, who stated that Kip was on probation before declaring he would be spoken about no more.

Rayne's hazing continued after The Beautiful People won an Impact! tag team match against Kong and Saeed, after which Rayne tried to cut the braided hair of the Knockout Champion Kong. With Sky in her corner, Angelina Love faced Kong and perennial nemesis Taylor Wilde in a three-way cage match for the Knockout Championship at Lockdown. Love narrowly escaped a somersault leg drop from Kong, and as she was recovering Love pushed her towards the cage while Sky pulled her frayed hair through the holes in the cage and tied her to it. With Kong unable to move from the cage, Wilde dove onto Love with a cross body press and legitimately knocked her unconscious with her knee. As she recovered, Wilde attacked Kong, allowing Love to roll-up Wilde for the pin and win the Knockout Championship. The following week on Impact!, Mi Pi Sexy had a celebration with male dancers and named Madison Rayne an official member of the Beautiful People. However, the celebration was cut short by Kong. Kong continued her attack on Mi Pi Sexy and proved her dominance by making her way through Rayne, Sky and Kip, who Love brought back to stop her, in stretcher matches on the following weeks of Impact!. Despite this, at Sacrifice Love retained her title against Kong.

On May 28, Love defended her title again against Sojourner Bolt with all of her associates at ringside. After quickly defeating Bolt, Love questioned why Cute Kip was still appearing with them and officially fired him from the group. After this Love made a speech about the dominance of The Beautiful People and mocked the lack of competition in TNA. This led to the debut of Tara who laid out both Sky and Rayne and used her Widow's Peak finisher on Love, before accepting the challenge. At Slammiversary, Tara had her chance at the title but with the help of some hairspray from Sky and Rayne, Love retained the championship. Tara, whose name alludes to the tarantula spider, began taunting the group with tarantulas over the next few weeks on Impact!, which resulted in Sky voicing her frustration about Love leaving her alone with the tarantula and threatening to leave the group, if Love didn't back her up.

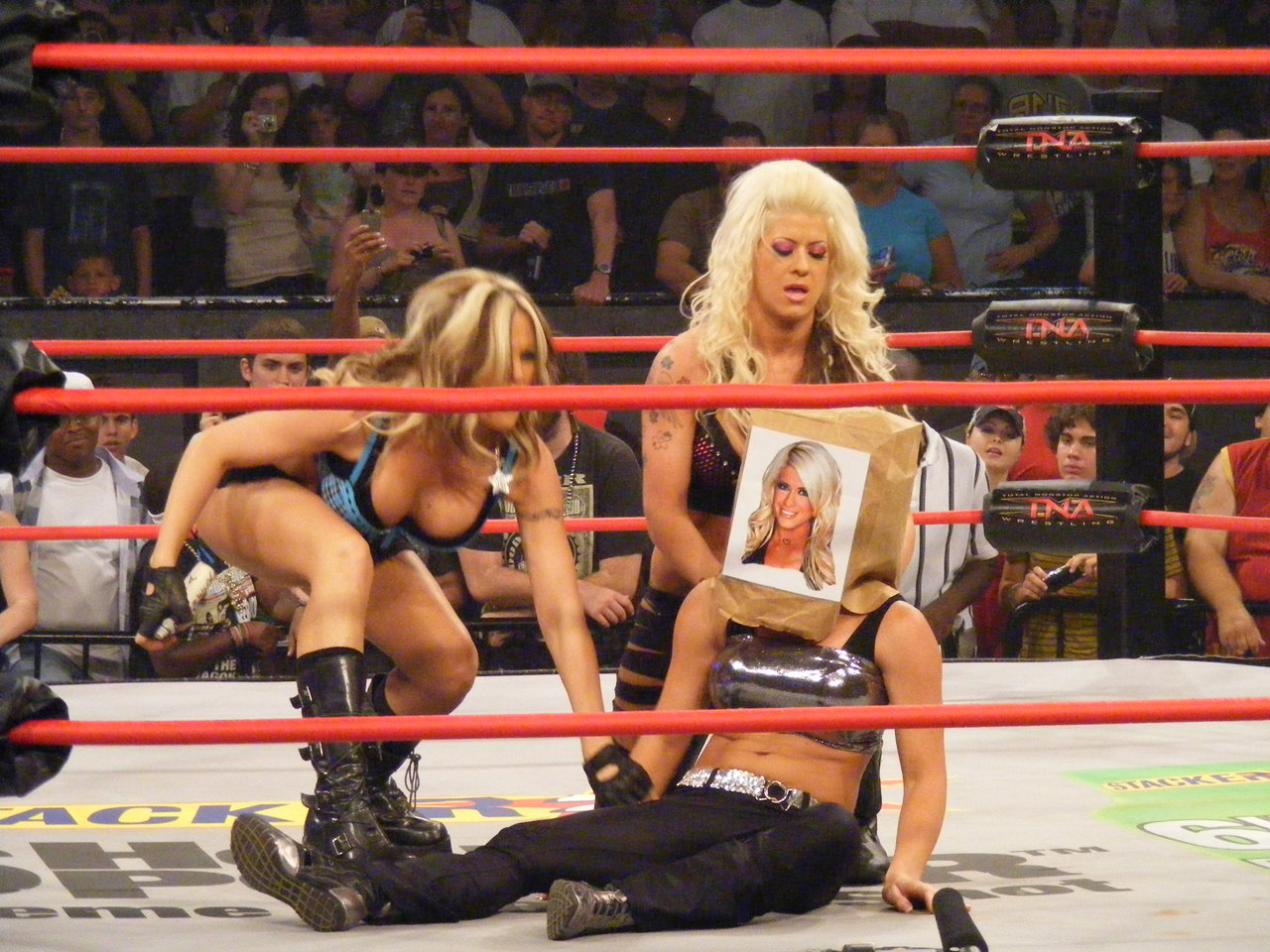
Love and Sky evicting Rayne from The Beautiful People

Consequently, when Tara defeated Sky and threatened to place a tarantula on her, Love agreed to put her Knockout Championship on the line immediately afterward, and without Rayne for support, Love lost the championship. The following week Love demanded and gained a rematch but was laid out with the Widow's Peak from Tara. At Victory Road, Love almost lost her match when she was accidentally blinded with hairspray, but kicked out and later pinned Tara despite her foot being under the bottom rope, to win back the Knockout Championship. Later in the evening the referee was seen leaving Rayne's shower, with the implication she had seduced him to officiate the match in Love's favour.

After all three failed to win a Battle Royal to become a member of Main Event Mafia, the group were seen mocking ODB and her associate Cody Deaner. A six-woman tag team match between all of Mi Pi Sexy against Tara, Kong and ODB turned into a three-on-one handicap match when Tara and Kong began to brawl between themselves. After a kiss from Deaner at ringside, Love was stunned and lost the match. It was later announced that at Hard Justice, the Knockout Championship would be on the line in a tag team contest between The Beautiful People against ODB and Deaner. After more mistimed hair spraying from Rayne, ODB won the title by virtue of Deaner pinning Sky. On the edition of August 20 of Impact!, Madison Rayne was kicked out of Mi Pi Sexy for costing Love the title, being assaulted and paper bagged by them.

On September 3, 2009, Williams was released from TNA due to visa issues, while still a top draw in the women's division. However, on September 7, 2009, Williams posted a blog entry on her MySpace account stating that she would return to TNA Wrestling once the issues with her visa were sorted out. She continued appearing on Impact! for two more weeks due to the tapings being held before her release. In the episodes she and Velvet Sky advanced to the finals of the tournament for the TNA Knockouts Tag Team Championship with help from Madison Rayne, whom they afterwards welcomed to return to the Beautiful People. Rayne would go on to replace Love in the finals for the Knockouts Tag Team Championship.

=== Women Superstars Uncensored (2009–2010) ===
After her release from TNA, Williams began working for Women Superstars Uncensored (WSU), where she performed under her TNA ring name of Angelina Love. On November 14, 2009, she unsuccessfully challenged Mercedes Martinez for the WSU Championship. On December 12 she teamed with Jennifer Cruz to defeat Jana and Rick Cataldo in a tag team match. After returning to TNA, Williams made one more appearance for WSU, defeating Sassy Stephie at the 3rd Anniversary Show on March 6, 2010.

=== Second return to TNA (2010–2012) ===
==== Feud with The Beautiful People (2010) ====
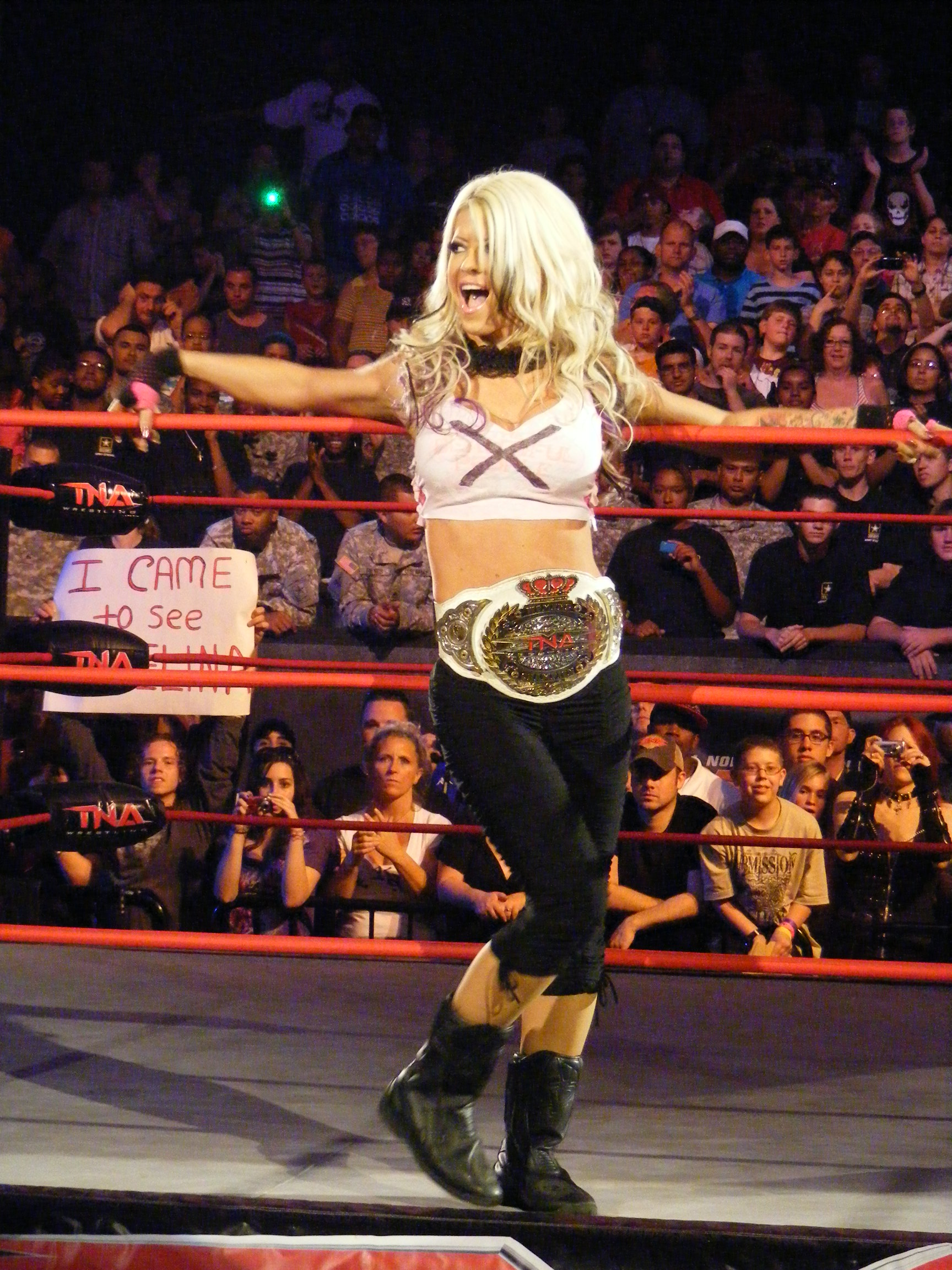
Love as the TNA Knockouts Champion, wearing an anti-Beautiful People T-shirt

On January 2, 2010, it was reported that Williams had re-signed with TNA. Williams, as Angelina Love, made her return on the January 14 episode of Impact!, appearing in the crowd and hugging Velvet Sky and Madison Rayne prior to their match with Awesome Kong and Hamada. However, after the match, Love turned face by attacking her former partners and Lacey Von Erich, her replacement in the group, seemingly angry about being replaced. She made her in-ring return the following week by defeating Rayne, however after the match she was triple teamed by the Beautiful People. On the February 4 episode of Impact! she was unsuccessful in her attempt to regain the Knockout Championship from Tara. On the March 8 episode of Impact! Love and Tara teamed up to challenge for the vacant Knockouts Tag Team Championship, but were defeated by Rayne and Sky, after interference from Daffney, with whom Tara was involved in a feud.

On the April 5 episode of Impact!, Love teamed with Tara, ODB, and Hamada to face the Beautiful People and Daffney in the first ever Lockbox elimination match, contested for four keys to four boxes containing prizes. Love won a key by eliminating Lacey Von Erich, and it was later revealed that her key opened the box, which contained the Knockout Championship, making her a three-time champion. After Love won the title, friction developed between her and Tara heading into their upcoming match against The Beautiful People, with Tara slowly turning villainous. At Lockdown, Love lost the Knockouts Championship to Madison Rayne, after she pinned Tara in a tag team steel cage match, where Love and Tara faced Rayne and Velvet Sky for both the Women's Knockout Championship and the Knockouts Tag Team Championship. After the match, Love was attacked by the evil Tara, who turned villainous in the process. At the April 20 tapings of Impact!, Williams partially tore her biceps and suffered ligament damage in her arm and was expected to be out of action until May. On May 26 it was announced that Williams had been cleared to return to wrestling.

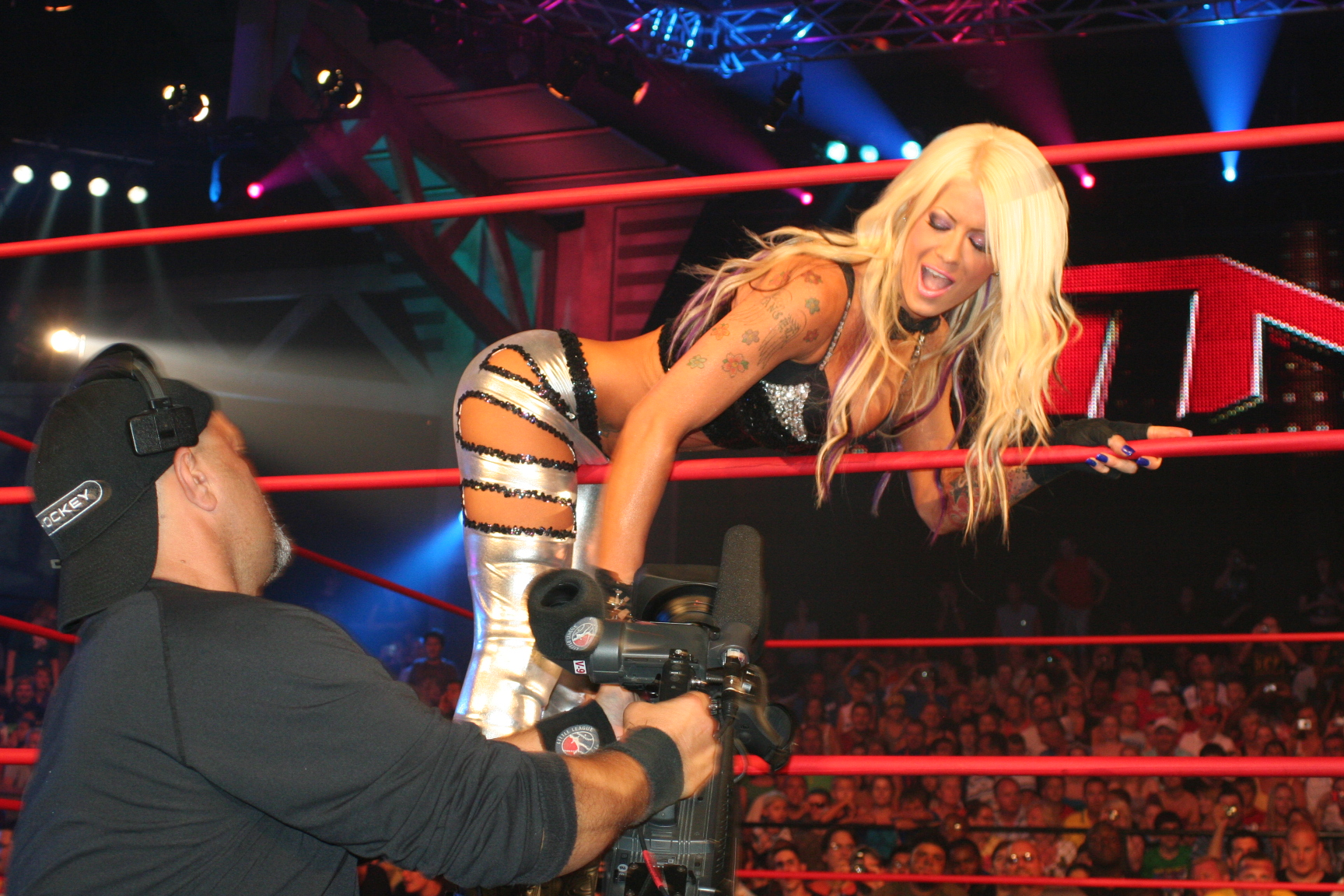
Love in July 2010

When Love returned from her injury on the June 17 episode of Impact!, she vowed to reclaim the Knockouts title and stated that she would go through each member of the Beautiful People to do it. That night she faced Von Erich and got disqualified after dropping her with a DDT on a steel chair. The following week her match with Velvet Sky ended in similar fashion. On July 11 at Victory Road, Love defeated Rayne via disqualification in a Title vs. Career match to win the Women's Knockout Championship for the fourth time. Prior to the match it was announced that the title would change hands via disqualification, if either Velvet Sky or Lacey Von Erich interfered in the match. However, the title was returned to Rayne on the July 22 episode of Impact!, when it was declared that there was no proof that the person who had interfered in the match was either Sky or Von Erich. The following week Love defeated Sarita to once again become the number one contender to Rayne's title. Two weeks later Love defeated Rayne, after a distraction from Velvet Sky, to win the Women's Knockout Championship for the fifth time.

On the August 19 episode of Impact!, Love reunited with Velvet Sky, who accompanied her to the ring, when she successfully defended her Women's Knockout Championship in a rematch against Rayne, who was with the mysterious biker woman. After the match Love and Sky were attacked by Rayne and the biker. Rayne's mysterious ally was finally unmasked as Tara on the September 2 episode of Impact!, when the two of them defeated Love and Sky in their first match together in a year. On the edition of September 16 of Impact! Love and Sky saved Lacey Von Erich, who was making a return from her injury, from a beating at the hands of Rayne and Tara and accepted her back into The Beautiful People. She, however, would leave the promotion two months later on November 11. During the feud Rayne had claimed to own the rights to the name the Beautiful People, but on the October 7 live edition of Impact!, Love and Sky defeated her and Tara in a tag team match to officially earn the right to call themselves the Beautiful People. On October 10 at Bound for Glory Love lost the Women's Knockout Championship to Tara in a Four Corners match, which also included Velvet Sky and Madison Rayne and was refereed by Mickie James.

==== Storyline with Winter and Knockouts Tag Team Champion (2010–2012) ====
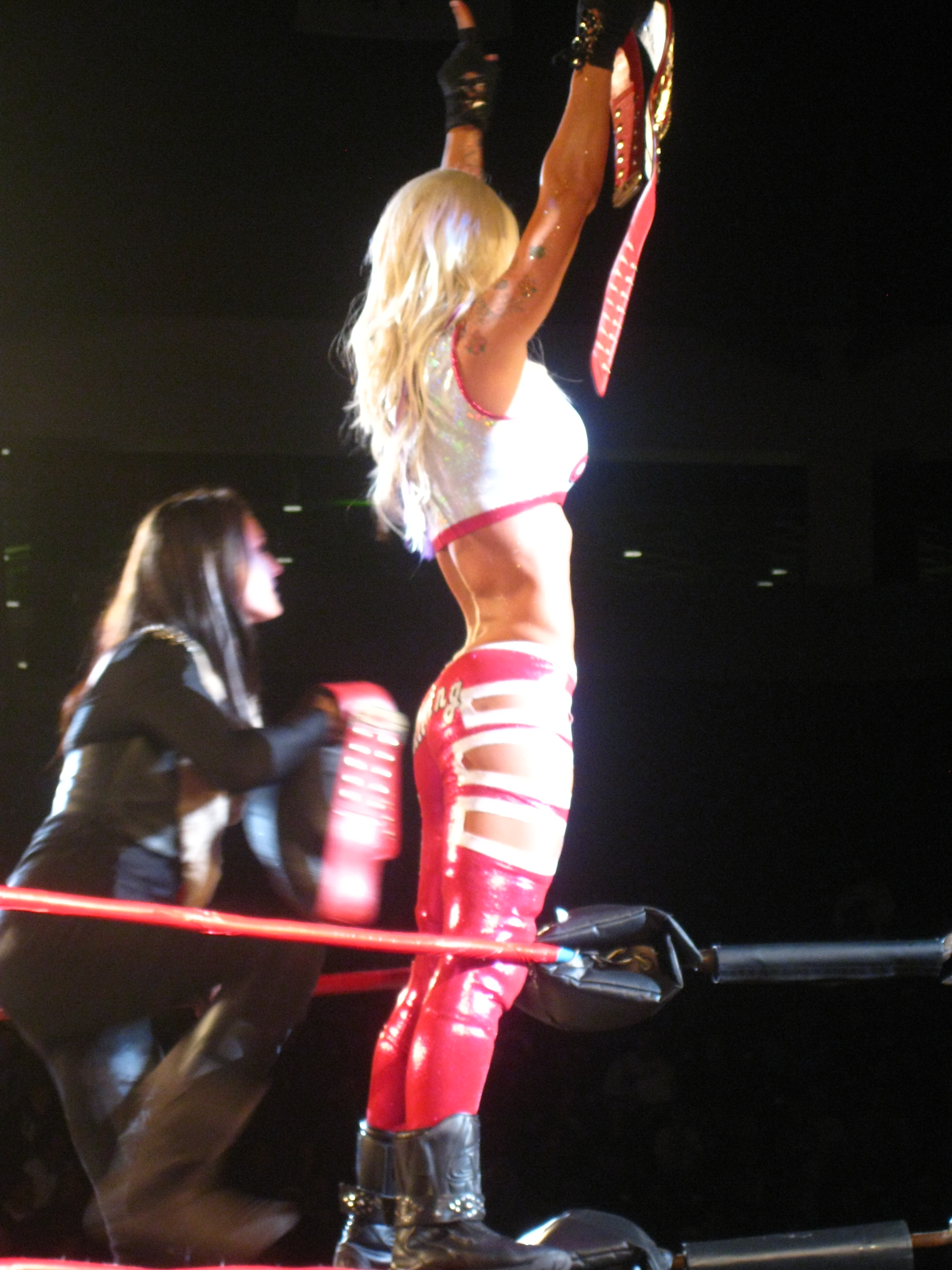
Love and Winter as the TNA Knockouts Tag Team Champions

On the October 21 episode of Impact! Love entered a storyline where a woman named Winter started appearing in mirrors, claiming to be her fan, though only Love was able to see her. After weeks of appearing only in front of Love, Winter was for the first time seen by the other people on the November 25 episode of Impact!, when she saved Love during a large backstage brawl. On the December 9 episode of Impact! Love and Sky entered a four–team tournament for the vacated Knockouts Tag Team Championship, defeating Sarita and Daffney in their first round match. On the December 23 episode of Impact!, Winter replaced an injured Velvet Sky, who had been attacked by Sarita, in the tournament final and teamed with Love to defeat Madison Rayne and Tara for the TNA Knockouts Tag Team Championship.

On the edition of January 13 of Impact!, Angelina and Winter successfully defend their championship against Madison Rayne and Tara after Winter knocked out Tara with a dragon sleeper. On the edition of January 27 of Impact!, Winter brawled with Velvet Sky, who claimed she was trying to break up The Beautiful People. On the edition of March 3 of Impact!, Cookie and Robbie E aligned themselves with former Jersey Shore cast member Angelina Pivarnick, with whom they bonded through their mutual dislike of Jenni "JWoww" Farley, whom Pivarnick proceeded to challenge to a match (whom was replaced by Winter). The following week, Love, Velvet Sky and Winter defeated Cookie, Angelina Pivarnick and Sarita in a six wrestler tag team match.

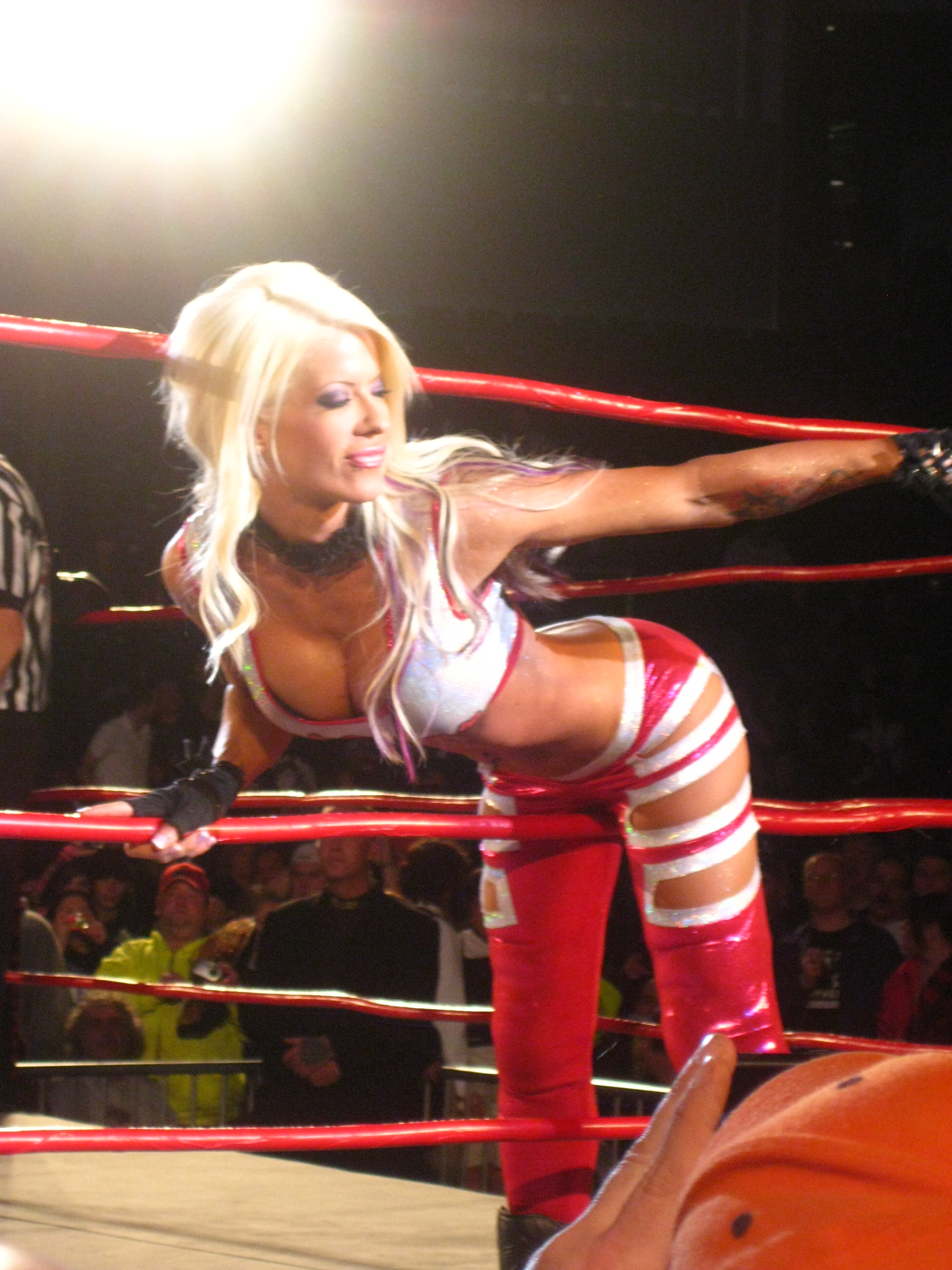
Love at a TNA live event

On March 13, 2011, at Victory Road, Love and Winter lost the Knockouts Tag Team Championship to Sarita and Rosita, after an interference by Velvet Sky backfired. On the March 24 episode of Impact!, Winter, seemingly having control over Love's actions, prevented her from saving Sky from a beatdown at the hands of Sarita and Rosita. Love was kept under Winter's spell with drinks of what she described as her medicine. On the April 7 episode of Impact!, Love turned heel by attacking Sky during a Knockouts Tag Team Championship match against Sarita and Rosita and left her to be pinned by the champions. On the April 28 episode of Impact!, Love defeated Sky via submission in a singles match, no-selling all of her opponent's offense during the match. On the May 5 episode of Impact!, Sky gained a measure of revenge on her former partner, when she teamed with Kurt Angle in a handicap mixed tag team match, where they defeated Love, Winter and Jeff Jarrett. The feud between the former Beautiful People partners seemingly ended on the May 19 episode of Impact Wrestling, with Sky defeating Love and Winter in a handicap match.

The following week Love attacked Mickie James, after she had defeated Winter in a singles match, setting up a match between the two for the TNA Women's Knockout Championship at Slammiversary IX. Prior to the match at the pay-per-view, Love declined to take her medicine, saying that she no longer needed it as she now understood Winter. After failing in her attempt to win the title, both Love and Winter attacked James. On the June 23 episode of Impact Wrestling, Love helped Winter defeat James in a non-title Street Fight. On August 7 at Hardcore Justice, Love again helped Winter defeat James, this time to become the new Women's Knockout Champion. On the September 15 episode of Impact Wrestling, Love failed to earn a shot at the title as she was defeated by Velvet Sky in a qualifying match.

After being inactive for two months, Love returned on the January 19 episode of Impact Wrestling, challenging Eric Young to a match. Young won the match via disqualification, after Love kicked him in the groin. On the January 26 episode of Impact Wrestling, Love and Winter lost to ODB and Eric Young in a tag team match; this was Love and Winter's last appearance together as a team. Love competed in a ten wrestler battle royal for the number one contendership for Gail Kim's Knockout Championship on the February 16 episode of Impact Wrestling, but was defeated by Madison Rayne. Love wrestled, what turned out to be her final Impact Wrestling match, on the April 5 episode, where she was defeated in a six-way number one contender's match by Velvet Sky. On June 14, at a TNA house show in Belton, Texas, Love teamed up with Winter for the first time in almost five months, when the two, Rosita and Sarita were defeated in a four-on-three handicap main event by Mickie James, Tara and Velvet Sky. Two days later at another house show in Houston, Texas, Love wrestled her final TNA match, where she and Winter were defeated by Tara and Velvet Sky, when Tara pinned Love.

On July 1, 2012, Williams announced on her Twitter page that she had been granted her release from TNA. According to her, she left the promotion because she didn't feel valued. Angelina also turn down an offer to return to the company in March 2013 as TNA reached out for her to appear at a one night PPV event.

=== Further returns to TNA/Impact Wrestling (2014–2016, 2017, 2023) ===
==== The Beautiful People reunion (2014–2016) ====
It was announced by TNA that a former TNA Women's Knockout Champion was signed to a contract and would be returning, which would later be revealed to be Love. Love made her return to TNA on the March 13, 2014, episode of Impact Wrestling, calling out Velvet Sky wanting to reunite The Beautiful People. Sky would later accept Love's offer on the March 20 episode of Impact Wrestling, while Madison Rayne declined due to Love's attitude towards her. Later in the show, Love attacked Rayne, after the two hugged, establishing herself as a heel in the process. On the March 27 episode of Impact Wrestling, Love defeated Rayne in her returning match due to interference from Sky, who also turned heel, officially returning the original heel incarnation of the stable. The Beautiful People made their in-ring return the following week on Impact Wrestling, defeating Rayne and Brittany, when Love pinned Brittany after a modified Makeover. On the April 10 episode of Impact Wrestling, Love defeated ODB, Gail Kim and Brittany in a fatal four-way match to become the number one contender to Rayne's Women's Knockout Championship. Later, it was announced that Love suffered a legitimate concussion during the match.

On the April 24 episode of Impact Wrestling, The Beautiful People would once again defeat Rayne in a tag team match, only this time with Gail Kim as her partner. Three days later, at the Sacrifice pay-per-view on April 27, Love defeated Rayne to become a six-time Knockouts Champion, her first reign since 2010. Kim joined the feud after interrupting Love's title celebration which led to Rayne and Brittany stripping The Beautiful People of their evening gowns. This led to a tag team elimination evening gown match on the May 8 episode of Impact Wrestling, which The Beautiful People won. In her first title defense, on the May 22 episode of Impact Wrestling, Love defeated Brittany in an open-challenge match. After the match, Love and Sky would attack Brittany and Gail Kim would make the save. This led to a tag team match, where The Beautiful People defeated Kim and Brittany on the edition of May 29 of Impact Wrestling. Love and Kim would finally face off in a title match on June 15 at the Slammiversary pay-per-view, where Love would successfully defend her championship. On June 20, during the tapings of the July 3 episode of Impact Wrestling, Love lost the Women's Knockout Championship to Kim, ending her reign at only 67 days.

On the July 10 episode of Impact Wrestling, Love unsuccessfully challenged Gail Kim for the title in a four-way match also involving Madison Rayne and Brittany. The Beautiful People would interrupt a championship match between Kim and Taryn Terrell on the July 24 episode of Impact Wrestling, leading to a no-contest. This led to a four-way contest for the Women's Knockout Championship between the four women, in which Love was unsuccessful in regaining the title. At Hardcore Justice, Love unsuccessfully challenged Kim for the title in a Last Knockout Standing match. In late 2014, The Beautiful People formed an alliance with The BroMans and regularly teamed with them. On the January 23, 2015, episode of Impact Wrestling, Velvet Sky retrieved a briefcase for Robbie E during the Feast or Fired match. The briefcase contained the "pink" slip and Sky was fired, effectively disbanding The Beautiful People in the process.

Love then separated from The BroMans after they disbanded in April 2015. On the TKO: Night of Knockouts special episode of Impact Wrestling on April 24, Love competed in a fatal four–way number one contender's match against Brooke, Gail Kim and Madison Rayne, which Brooke won. On the May 8 episode of Impact Wrestling, Velvet Sky returned to TNA and attacked Love. On the June 3 episode of Impact Wrestling, Love got Sky arrested by her security staff after she attacked Madison Rayne, while Love was arrested herself by event staff as Sky appeared as a fan, and was arrested for fan assault. On the June 24 episode of Impact Wrestling, Sky defeated Love to secure her spot on the roster.

On the September 2 episode of Impact Wrestling, Love and Madison Rayne came to the aid of Velvet Sky, who was being beaten down by The Dollhouse members Rebel, Jade and Marti Bell, turning face and reforming The Beautiful People in the process. The following week, The Beautiful People were attacked backstage by the Dollhouse, which resulted in Love breaking her arm in the storyline, writing her off television due to her legitimate pregnancy. On March 27, 2016, Williams announced on her Twitter account that her contract with TNA had expired during the pregnancy.

==== Feud with Eddie and Alisha Edwards (2017) ====
On January 8, 2017, during the tapings for TNA One Night Only: Rivals 2017, Love made her return to TNA, defeating Madison Rayne. Month later, on the February 9 episode of Impact Wrestling, Love appeared in the crowd and attacked Eddie Edwards' real–life wife, Alisha Edwards after Love's husband, Davey Richards, pulled the referee out of the ring and cost Edwards his match against Lashley. After the match, Richards and Love attacked Alisha and Eddie, with Love establishing herself as a villainess. on the May 11 episode of Impact Wrestling, Love lost to Alisha Edwards by disqualification. At Slammiversary XV, Love and Richards lost a Full Metal Mayhem match to Alisha and Eddie Edwards.

On August 12, 2017, Love announced that she asked for her release from Impact and it was granted.

==== Appearances with Impact (2023, 2025) ====
On September 14 at Impact 1000, Love along with Velvet Sky made a return to TNA, now known as Impact Wrestling, after a six-year absence, confronting Gail Kim and the Knockouts. The following week, Love teamed up with Gisele Shaw, Deonna Purrazzo, Savannah Evans and Tasha Steelz, losing to Gail Kim, Jordynne Grace, Mickie James, Trinity and Awesome Kong. On September 2025, it was announced Love and Sky will be inducted into the TNA Hall of Fame.

=== Ring of Honor (2019–2022; 2023) ===
==== The Allure alliance stable (2019–2022; 2023) ====
On April 6, 2019, at the G1 Supercard in New York City, Love and Sky made their debut for Ring of Honor as they aligned with Mandy Leon, forming a heel stable known as "The Allure". The trio attacked Kelly Klein, who had just won the ROH Women of Honor World Championship against Mayu Iwatani, as well as Jenny Rose and Stella Gray who tried to make the save for Klein. Love and Sky's debut and alliance with Leon in the promotion come just a few weeks after their former stablemate Madison Rayne left and announced that the promotion rejected her Beautiful People reunion, but suggested this idea instead. Throughout the summer, The Allure continued their rivalry with Kelly Klein as the trio would attack her before and after her matches and defeat her in various tag team matches. After she pinned Klein in a tag team match, Love earned herself a title match, which took place on September 27, at Death Before Dishonor XVII, where she defeated Klein to win the Women of Honor World Championship for the first time in her career. She lost the title back to Klein at Glory By Honor, ending her reign at only 15 days. At Final Battle, Love lost to Maria Manic.

During year 2021 Angelina Love entered the inaugural ROH Women's World Championship tournament and got a BYE in the first round. During the second round Angelina defeated Max the Impaler via disqualification. During the semifinals Angelina Love lost to Rok-C via submission.

On August 20, 2021 at Glory By Honor XVIII Night 1 Angelina Love & Mandy Leon faced Vita VonStarr and Max The Impaler in a ROH Women of Honor tag team match but we're unsuccessful.

On October 27, 2021 Angelina Love & Mandy Leon challenged The Hex (Allysin Kay & Marti Belle) for the NWA World Women's Tag Team Championship's but we're not successful.

On December 11, 2021 Angelina Love & Mandy Leon teamed up with Miranda Alize to take on Chelsea Green and The Hex (Allysin Kay & Marti Belle) in a six-women tag team match at ROH Final Battle and we're successful.

During year 2022 Angelina Love disappeared from Ring of Honor with her fans assuming that her no longer showing up at ROH possible might be a release.

On September 21, 2023 Angelina Love returned to Ring of Honor (ROH) to face longest reigning ROH Women's World Champion Athena for the Championship but was unsuccessful.

After the match during year 2023 Angelina Love once more left Ring of Honor.

=== National Wrestling Alliance (2022–2023) ===
Love made her National Wrestling Alliance (NWA) debut on the April 23, 2022, episode NWA PowerrrSurge USA, where she defeated Riley. On the April 26 episode of NWA Powerrr, Love announced that she has signed a contract with NWA. Later, on the same episode, Love has defeated Tootie Lynn.

On the January 31, 2023, episode of NWA Powerrr, Kamille and Thom Latimer are standing with Kyle Davis, who says their scheduled match against Psycho Love is off, as Love and "Psycho Boy" Fodder were unable to make the show. Kamille says they were just scared, and that's why they didn't come to the show. Love and Fodder attack Latimer and Kamille from behind. Fodder slams Latimer into the ring post. Love takes the fight to Kamille. She chokes the champion with a kendo stick. Love hits Latimer with a low blow, and Fodder hits him with a kendo stick. Love drops Kamille with the Botox Injection. It was later announced that Love would challenge Kamille for the NWA World Women's Championship in a No Disqualification match at Nuff Said. At the event, Love was defeated by Kamille and failed to win the title.

== Personal life ==
In late 2007, she began dating Jared Weeks, the lead singer of the band Saving Abel, the couple decided to split in August 2008.

In January 2015, Williams began dating fellow TNA wrestler Davey Richards. The couple announced their engagement on April 27, 2015, and were married on June 10, 2015. On July 30, Williams announced on her Twitter account that she and Richards were expecting their first child, a boy born on March 17, 2016. In 2017, Williams tweeted that she and Richards have divorced.

On March 8, 2023, Love announced her engagement to longtime boyfriend and fellow professional wrestler Merton Woolard. On October 1, 2023 Love married Woolard in an intimate beach ceremony.

== Other media ==
Williams appeared on an episode of The Jenny Jones Show about former "geeks" turned into physical competitors. She also made an appearance on Kenny vs Spenny in the episode "Who is the Strongest", alongside fellow TNA Knockout Traci Brooks. Williams played small roles in the 2008 film CX2: The Movie, and in the 2010 indie film Good Intentions, starring LeAnn Rimes and Luke Perry. She was also featured on an episode of MTV's Made, alongside A.J. Styles, Taylor Wilde, and Velvet Sky. On January 24, 2009, she appeared as a "soccerette" on British television program Soccer AM, wearing a Leeds United replica shirt, along with Velvet Sky. In November 2010, she was a contestant on an all TNA week of Family Feud, teaming with Christy Hemme, Lacey Von Erich, Tara and Velvet Sky against Jay Lethal, Matt Morgan, Mick Foley, Mr. Anderson and Rob Van Dam. Williams played the role of Rosemary Black in the 2011 Dark Rising film Dark Rising: Summer Strikes Back, and the 2014 television series Dark Rising: Warrior of Worlds.

== Championships and accomplishments ==
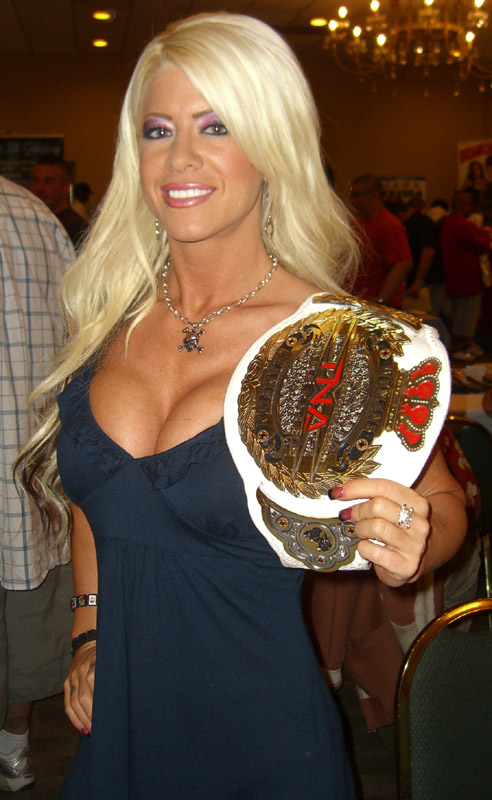
Love is a six-time TNA Women's Knockouts Champion

- Ohio Valley Wrestling
  - Women's Nightmare Rumble (2022)
- Pro Wrestling Illustrated
  - Ranked her No. 2 of the top 50 female wrestlers in the PWI Female Top 50 in 2009 and in 2010
- Pro Wrestling Pride
  - PWP Women's Championship (1 time)
- Ring of Honor
  - Women of Honor World Championship (1 time)
- Total Nonstop Action Wrestling
  - TNA Women's Knockout Championship (6 times)
  - TNA Knockouts Tag Team Championship (1 time) – with Winter
  - TNA Knockouts Tag Team Championship Tournament (2010) – with Winter
  - Global Impact Tournament (2015) – with The Great Sanada, Drew Galloway, Magnus, The Great Muta, Tigre Uno, Bram, Rockstar Spud, Khoya and Sonjay Dutt
  - TNA Hall of Fame (Class of 2025) - with Velvet Sky
- Women's Wrestling Hall of Fame
  - Class of 2025
- World Class Revolution
  - WCR Diamond Division Championship (1 time)
