= My Dad the Rock Star =

2003 Canadian-French TV series or programme

- Genre: Adventure; Comedy
- Created by: Gene Simmons
- Directed by: Doug Thoms
- Voices of: Jo Vannicola; Lawrence Bayne; Kathy Laskey; Stephanie Anne Mills; Don Francks; Sarah Gadon; Rob Stefaniuk
- Theme music composer: Grayson Matthews Inc.
- Composers: Gerard Tevlin; Jonathan Evans
- Countries of origin: Canada; France
- Original language: English
- No. of seasons: 2
- No. of episodes: 26

Production
- Executive producers: Paul Robertson; Scott Dyer; Emmanuelle Petry; Claude Carrere; Gene Simmons; Doug Murphy
- Producer: Marilyn MacAuley
- Running time: 30 minutes
- Production companies: Nelvana Limited; Carrere Group S.A.

Original release
- Network: Teletoon (Canada); M6 (France)
- Release: September 1, 2003 – July 5, 2004

My Dad the Rock Star is an animated television series created by Kiss bassist Gene Simmons, produced by Nelvana in partnership with Carrere Group and in association with Teletoon (now known as Cartoon Network). The show aired from September 1, 2003, until July 5, 2004. Twenty-six episodes of two seasons were produced. In the US, the show aired on Nickelodeon and Nicktoons.

== Plot ==
The series focuses on Willy Zilla, a timid teenage boy just trying to be a normal person, despite being the son of a flamboyant, rich and lively celebrity rock star named Rock Zilla.

== Production ==
Gene Simmons wanted to create a cartoon series with a loud rock star for his children. The idea of the cartoon started when Gene's son, Nick, in his kindergarten days, brought in a picture of Gene drooling blood and spitting fire for a project of what his parents do, which may have influenced the character of Willy Zilla.

Before becoming a series, this concept became a book, My Dad the Rock Star: Rebel Without a Nose Ring (ISBN 1894786025) by Canadian author Liam O'Donnell in 2001. Because Gene loved Nelvana shows, he called the Canadian production company with a cartoon idea. It was initially about the band Kiss itself, but it was later changed to a family of rock-star parents, which were based on Gene's family.

The series went on hiatus after the episode "Blind Date", until it was announced that the show ended.

== Characters ==
=== Main ===
- William "Willy" Zilla (voiced by Jo Vannicola) – The show's main protagonist; Rock and Crystal's son and Serenity's younger brother. Willy never had a normal life when he was on tour with his family until he came to Silent Springs. Throughout the series, Willy gradually becomes more comfortable in who he is and accepts his new, more normal lifestyle. Willy aspires to be a musician like his father and grandfather (see below) and has inherited their musical talent. Willy's music of choice is jazz, and he plays the trumpet in the school band. He realizes that he was living a normal life the whole time with his family, and he doesn't have to be literally normal; he is more mature and more responsible than his father, and he acts like a grown-up.
- Rockford Amadeus "Rock" Zilla (voiced by Lawrence Bayne) – The title character. Rock has loved rock-'n-roll since birth. Even though Rock is the father of the family, he is very immature and behaves/acts like a teenager. His own father is a well-known classical cellist who still does not quite understand him. Despite this, Rock cares for his family very much and goes out of his way to be a decent father.
- Crystal Zilla (voiced by Kathy Laskey) – Rock's wife, and Serenity and Willy's mother. Crystal is a pink-haired spiritualist.
- Serenity Zilla (voiced by Stephanie Anne Mills) – Willy's older sister and Rock and Crystal's daughter. Serenity is the stereotypical teenage girl: spoiled, boy-crazy, egotistical, and ditzy. She picks on Willy, views him to be nothing more than a nuisance and easily gets lost in the mansion. Despite this, she does have a kind side (one of those examples being that when she grew attached to the elderly residents in the seniors' home in the episode "Rock Bottom"), and can also be supportive of her brother at times.
- Nigel "Skunk" Fanshawe (voiced by Don Francks) – Ex-driver of the Zilla tour bus, friend/manager of the family. Skunk is from the United Kingdom (British) and has a long two-toned ponytail, hence his name. Skunk is often the voice of reason for the Zillas. He uses the tour bus, permanently parked on the mansion's grounds, as his apartment.
- Alyssa (voiced by Sarah Gadon) – Willy's sarcastic best friend, and eventually girlfriend. She is an environmental activist.
- Quincy Nesrallah (voiced by Martin Villafana) – Willy's other best friend, who is African-Canadian. Prefers to be called "Q" and often tries to act like he is from the ghetto. His father is an accountant and is often perceived as being narrow-minded, but is later revealed to be a talented band drummer whose love of numbers came first in his life. He also has an older sister named Caitlin just like Willy

=== Supporting ===
- Robert "Buzz" Sawchuck (voiced by Rob Stefaniuk) – Lloyd's son and Willy's school bully. Although brutal and violent, Buzz often speaks in the manner of a Shakespearian actor, making long-winded speeches and monologues. Buzz has a crush on Alyssa, which is not reciprocated.
- Principal Malfactor (voiced by Jim Millington) – A strict disciplinarian, with a particular dislike for Willy and his father. He once tried to have music class removed from school, and to have Willy expelled. Both times, he was foiled by Rock's intervention. Bears an uncanny resemblance to Ed Sullivan.
- Mr. Kant – The Zillas' next-door neighbor. He utterly despises Rock for all the chaos he causes, but has a soft spot for Willy and appreciates the boy's maturity. He has two pets (a cat and a dog), Helga and Henderson, who are friends with Mosh.
- Mosh – The Zillas' lovable purple-and-green pet Komodo dragon. Meant only to be a stage gimmick for Rock's performances, the family could not bear to send him away when it didn't work out, and so adopted him as the family pet.
- Miss. Equiss – A strict teacher at Willy's school.
- Scoop Baverdash – A reporter who regularly harasses Rock.
- Lloyd Sawchuck – Buzz's father, the head of the school board, and a loyal fan of Rock's, owning all of his albums.
- Angela D'Angelo - The first girl Willy fell in love with. Her parents are extremely strict and disapprove of Rock so much that when they learned that Willy was Rock's son, they moved to Alaska to get away from him.

== Episodes ==
Canadian network Teletoon airdates in parentheses:

=== Season 1 (2003–04) ===
No.	Title	Original release date
1	"Welcome to Silent Springs"	September 1, 2003
Rock and his family move to Silent Springs. Willy disguises himself as "Willy Zillowsky", but he is forced by Buzz to steal Rock's gold record.
2	"Zilla House of Horrors"	September 8, 2003
Willy hears Buzz claim that the house is haunted due to being built on a graveyard.
3	"Mr. Zilla's Opus"	September 15, 2003
Rock reveals to everyone in school that Willy is his son when he becomes the school's new band teacher. Even though the teachers find out about Willy lied about his last name, Willy doesn't get in trouble for it. Note: "Mr. Zilla's Opus" is a parody of Mr. Holland's Opus.
4	"High Infidelity"	September 22, 2003
Crystal opens a Psychic Wellness Centre next to Willy's school, earning Willy some ribbing over his flakey Mom. Buzz tries to become Willy's friend, only for Willy to discover Buzz is now working for two music piracy con men.
5	"Angela D'Angelo"	September 29, 2003
When Willy meets a new student named Angela, she invites him to a pre-date with her parents who dislike Rock Zilla.
6	"The Candidate"	October 6, 2003
Willy plans to be the candidate for class representative, but Buzz keeps stealing all of his plans and bullies everyone into voting for him. Willy eventually wins even with the chaos caused by asking his parents to act normal.
7	"Willy Unplugged"	October 13, 2003
Willy is going to play his trumpet at the school talent night, but when Rock finds out, he tries to "help" by adding over-the-top theatrics to Willy's show. Alyssa and Q try to get in on Willy's act with less-than-musical results.
8	"Dance Party"	October 20, 2003
Willy joins the dance committee, but the teacher, Ms. Equiss, doesn't want the dance to change from the boring theme it had for the past 15 years.
9	"Psychic Convention"	October 27, 2003
Crystal asks Willy to come with her to the Psychic Convention to meet Madame Persenchia, but he has to study for a math test and Mosh goes missing.
10	"Call of the Wild"	November 3, 2003
The Zillas go on a camping trip with Willy's friends but something goes horribly wrong.
11	"Mr. Big"	November 10, 2003
When Sally Raptor, the most popular girl in school, offers Willy a coveted spot in the "in crowd", Willy gets a taste of what it's like to be extremely popular and it rocks! But complications arise when Sally tries to get Willy to abandon Alyssa and Q. Meanwhile, Serenity is terrorizing the neighborhood by practicing to get her driver's license.
12	"Rebel Without a Nose Ring"	November 17, 2003
Buzz sets Willy up to experience a series of unfortunate encounters with Mr. Malfactor after which he labels Willy a Rebel and seizes the opportunity to restore order upon the student body by implementing a dress code. The episode's title is based on a book.
13	"Meet the Zillas"	February 2, 2004
Rock decides that TV is boring so he starts his own reality show. But later as they prank on Willy, they change the show to "Meet Willy Zilla".

=== Season 2 (2004) ===
No.	Title	Original release date
14	"Going for Broke"	December 1, 2003
When the Zillas go broke, Q's father invites them to stay at their house.
15	"Rock Is from Mars, Willy Is from Venus"	February 9, 2004
Willy and Rock try to spend some quality time together, but things don't go as Willy intended.
16	"The Sound of Zilla"	February 16, 2004
Willy's school is celebrating International Students Week.
17	"Home for the Holly Daze"	December 22, 2003
It's the Zillas' first Christmas in Silent Springs, and when they inadvertently cause a famous Broadway director to lose his job, misery befalls them when he tries to get even.
18	"What's the Scoop?"	March 15, 2004
Scoop keeps on sneaking out on Rock; Buzz puts Willy in detention after he arrives late. So Scoop and Willy concoct a plan to prove his innocence.
19	"Rock Bottom"	March 22, 2004
It's Rock's birthday, but things get chaotic when Rock gets depressed, Serenity lands herself in the slammer for having large amounts of unpaid parking tickets, and she ends up serving community service at a senior's home, with Rock as her newest patient.
20	"Saving Sawchuck"	May 3, 2004
After Willy saves Buzz from drowning, he has to let Buzz save him from harm; Serenity falls in love with the Lifeguard, so she has lifeguard lessons.
21	"King of the Desert"	May 10, 2004
Willy, Q, and Alyssa take on a band trip but end up in the middle of the desert: Serenity and Crystal have to hide Rock's concert t-shirt (which he refuses to wash) until he comes back.
22	"Big Willy on Campus"	May 17, 2004
Rock is given an honorary doctorate by his old college, Cere Bellum University, but someone has it in for Rock.
23	"Metamorphic Rock"	May 24, 2004
Willy, Q and Alyssa are assigned a group project in Science class but with his mother is missing in action, the house gets chaotic.
24	"Kant Buy Me Love"	May 31, 2004
Willy and his friends help their neighbor Mr. Kant throw a silent party.
25	"Chip Off the Old Rock"	June 7, 2004
Rock's parents come to visit him, but he and his father are mortal enemies; Serenity and her grandmother have a day off.
26	"Blind Date"	July 5, 2004
Willy and Alyssa become attracted to each other after a night at the movies. When Willy realizes that he is now dating her, he becomes a wreck, as he is afraid of how Q will react, and what this will mean for the trio's friendship. Meanwhile, Rock is trying to celebrate his 20-year wedding anniversary with Crystal, but each of his plans only seems to upset her.

== Reception ==
Common Sense Media rated the show 4 out of 5 stars, stating, "My Dad the Rock Star actually offers positive social messages, although they're subtle and blended in with wit and irony.... At its core, My Dad the Rock Star is a simple cartoon about the difficulties of staying yourself and still fitting in."
