= Boyd Banks =

Canadian comedian and actor (born 1964)

- Born: April 16, 1964 (age 62); Moose Jaw, Saskatchewan, Canada
- Occupations: Comedian, actor

Boyd Banks (born April 16, 1964) is a Canadian stand-up comedian and actor.

== Early life ==
He was born in Moose Jaw, Saskatchewan, and began his career in the entertainment industry at 17 when he won a contest for Best Stand-Up Comedian in Edmonton, Alberta. He then performed as a stand-up comedian for a few years in Vancouver, British Columbia, before moving to Toronto to act.

== Career ==
Banks has appeared in films including Bruiser (2001), Wild Iris (2001), Dawn of the Dead (2004), Phil the Alien (2004), Land of the Dead (2005), Cinderella Man (2005), Diary of the Dead (2007) and Pontypool (2009).

Among his television credits were guest appearances in Due South and Slings and Arrows, and as a member of the repertory cast of the A&E television series, A Nero Wolfe Mystery. He has had recurring roles in The Red Green Show and Little Mosque on the Prairie.

In February 2019, Banks faced criticism following an incident when, during a live television news report on a meeting responding to SiriusXM Canada's controversial plan to rebrand its Canada Laughs channel, he began licking CBC reporter Chris Glover's ear. Banks apologized the following day, calling himself an "idiot" for his behaviour.

== Filmography ==
=== Films ===
Year	Title	Role	Notes
1996	Black Sheep	Clyde Spinoza	
1996	Crash	Grip	
1996	Holiday Affair		TV movie
1997	The Wrong Guy	Gas Station Guy	
1997	Dinner at Fred's	Talent Show MC	
1997	Bad to the Bone	Gun Salesman	TV movie
1997	I'll Be Home for Christmas	Ethan	TV movie
1997	Howling at the Moon		TV movie
1998	Dirty Work	Creepy Man	
1998	Strink	Mr.Bothom	
1998	Dog Park	Ge Groovy Lesh	
1998	Earthquake in New York	Statue Man	
1998	Naked City: A Killer Christmas	Jack	TV movie
1999	The Jesse Ventura Story	Brooklyn Park Mayor	TV movie
1999	Dash and Lilly	Prison Guard	TV movie
1999	Superstar	Weatherman	
2000	Bruiser	Jester	
2000	The Highwayman	Luger	
2000	Cheaters	State Speech Judge	TV movie
2000	The Ladies Man	C&W Station Manager	
2000	Possessed	Zealot	TV movie
2001	Club Land	Elegante announcer	TV movie
2001	Chasing Cain	Ralph	
2001	Kiss My Act	Stand-Up Comic	TV movie
2001	Jason X	Fat Lou	
2001	Wild Iris	Handprint Clerk	TV movie
2001	Knockaround Guys	Bar Patron	
2001	Prancer Returns	Charlie's Teacher	Straight-to-Video
2002	A Killing Spring	Hotel Manager	TV movie
2002	American Psycho 2	Jim	Straight-to-video
2002	Avenging Angelo	Paramedic	
2002	The Tuxedo	Vic	
2002	Cypher	Fred Garfield	
2002	Escape from the Newsroom	Martin	TV movie
2002	Meet Prince Charming	Roger	
2003	The Music Man	Train Conductor	TV movie
2003	Deacons for Defense	Weber	TV movie
2003	The In-Laws	Patient	TV movie
2003	Rhinoceros Eyes	Hospital Orderly	
2003	The Republic of Love	Man at Folklore Museum	uncredited
2003	The Piano Man's Daughter	Priest	TV movie
2003	Fallen Angel	Birdie	TV movie
2004	Ham & Cheese	Barry's Boss at Canadian Theatre Company	
2004	Dawn of the Dead	Tucker	
2004	New York Minute	Ticket Window Guy	
2004	Harold & Kumar Go to White Castle	E.R. Patient	
2004	Phil the Alien	Slim	
2004	Saint Ralph	Worker #1	
2005	Riding the Bus with My Sister	Henry	TV movie
2005	Cinderella Man	Reporter	
2005	Land of the Dead	Butcher	
2005	Get Rich or Die Tryin'	Prison Solitary Guard	
2006	The Fountain	Dominican friar	
2007	How She Move	Mike Evans	
2007	Diary of the Dead	White Man	
2007	Lars and the Real Girl	Russell	
2007	Chasing Tchaikovsky	Nikolai	
2007	Left of Dead	Michael Lymburner	
2008	Hank and Mike	Leon the Neighbor	
2008	The Love Guru	EMT	
2008	Pontypool	Jay (Osama)	
2008	Coopers' Camera	Sgt. Stevenson	
2008	Saving God	Poole	
2008	Hooked on Speedman	Man in Wheelchair	
2009	You Might as Well Live	Uncle Casper	
2009	Before You Say 'I Do'	Apartment Guy	TV movie
2010	Medium Raw: Night of the Wolf		TV movie
2012	Dead Before Dawn	Gas Station Attendant	
2012	Silent Hill: Revelation	Priest	
2013	Algonquin	Geordie Oliver	
2014	Bang Bang Baby	Gord	
2014	Hellmouth	Fred Whinny	
2018	State Like Sleep	I.V. Drinking Man	
2021	All My Puny Sorrows	Pastor	

=== Television ===
Year	Title	Role	Notes
1991	The Kids in the Hall	Finacee	1 episode
1995	Goosebumps	Mr.Johnson	1 episode
1995	Due South	Norm Betz	1 episode
1997	The Newsroom	Parking Guy	1 episode
1998	The Red Green Show	Earl Battersty	2 episodes
1998	Once a Thief	Wedding Bell Blues	
1998	Traders	No Fixed Address	
1998	Power Play	Brother in Arms	
2001–2002	A Nero Wolfe Mystery	Multiple (Repertory player)	13 episodes
2007–2012	Little Mosque on the Prairie	Joe Peterson	
2008	Testees	Dr.Zimmerman	1 episode
2009	Hotbox		4 episodes
2016	11.22.63	Barfly	Episode: "The Rabbit Hole"
2018	Star Falls	Security Guard	1 episode
2019–present	Agent Binky: Pets of the Universe	Loo	
