= 2012: Kurse a di Xtabai =

2012 film directed by Matthiew Klinck

- Directed by: Matthiew Klinck
- Produced by: Matthiew Klinck; Daniel Velazquez
- Starring: Nehanda Higinio
- Music by: Ricardo Galvez
- Production company: Make-Belize Films
- Release date: July 13, 2012 (Belize International Film Festival)
- Running time: 80 minutes
- Country: Belize
- Language: Belizean Creole

2012: Kurse a di Xtabai (Curse of the Xtabai) is an 80-minute Belizean Creole-language supernatural thriller and the first major feature length dramatic movie to be entirely made in Belize. It was directed by Matthiew Klinck and selected as the opening night movie of the 2012 Belize International Film Festival. It was then taken on a national tour around the country and projected for audiences on an inflatable screen. The movie was made with an entirely Belizean cast, some of which had never acted before.

== Cast ==
- Miriam Antoinette-Ochaeta as Mom
- Arran Bevis as John Jones
- Nicasio Coc as Mayan Elder
- Ian Flowers as Ian
- Shelley Glionna as Xtabai
- Robert Grieg as Bobby
- Esmeralda Hernandez as America
- Roseli Hernandez as Hollywood
- Nehanda Higinio as Nehanda
- Memory Magdaleno as Memory
- Edgardo Serrut as Edgardo
