= List of Y B Normal? episodes =

The following is the complete list of Y B Normal? episodes. The sketch comedy show premiered on September 15, 1998, and aired 19 episodes over two seasons.

== Seasons ==
Season	Episodes	Originally aired	DVD release date	
Season	Episodes	Originally aired	Region 1	Discs
1	6	1998	TBA	TBA
2	13	1999	TBA	TBA

== Season 1 (1998) ==
Title	Original airdate	Episode #
Unknown	September 15, 1998	101
Unknown	Unknown	102
Unknown	Unknown	103
Unknown	Unknown	104
Unknown	Unknown	105
Unknown	Unknown	106

== Season 2 (1999) ==
Title	Original airdate	Episode #
"P E N I S"	Unknown	201
"Caught on Tape"	Unknown	202
"Lost Innocence"	Unknown	203
Unknown	Unknown	204
Unknown	Unknown	205
Unknown	Unknown	206
Unknown	Unknown	207
Unknown	Unknown	208
Unknown	Unknown	209
"Godot"	Unknown	210
Unknown	Unknown	211
Unknown	Unknown	212
Unknown	Unknown	213
