= Matthiew Klinck =

Canadian film director (1978–2016)

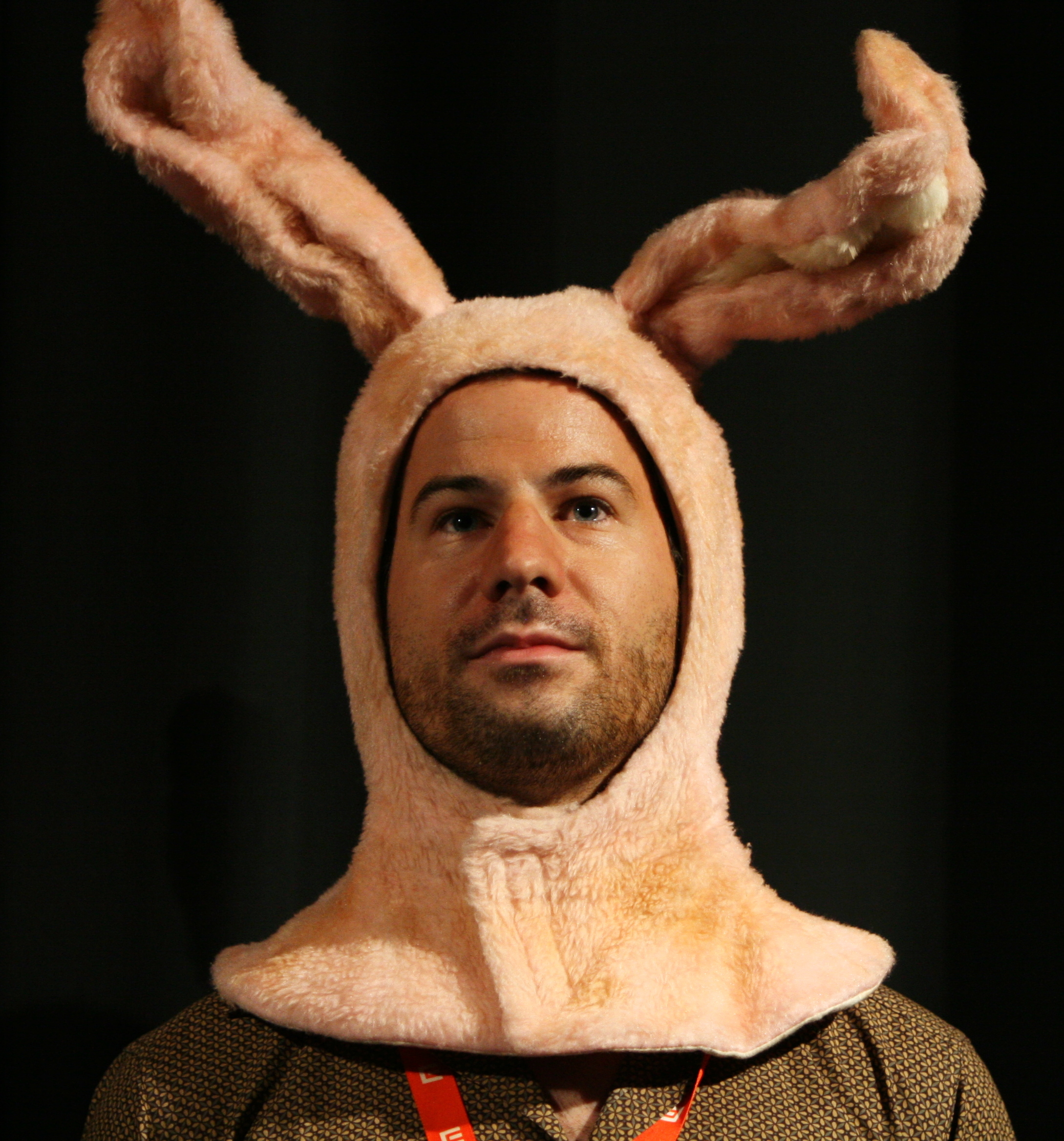
- Born: September 5, 1978; Aylmer, Quebec, Canada
- Died: January 2, 2016 (aged 37); Cayo District, Belize
- Occupation: film director
- Years active: 1998–2015

Matthiew Klinck (September 5, 1978 – January 2, 2016) was a Canadian film director and producer who lived in Belize. He founded and operated the cinema arts training and production program Make-Belize Films. On January 4, 2016, Klinck was found dead outside his home in Selena, a village in Cayo District, Belize.

== Directed ==
- 2012: Kurse a di Xtabai (2012)
- Tagayet (2012)
- Hank and Mike (2008)
- Greg & Gentillon (2005)
- Straight (2002)
- Une mission à partager (2001)
- Lord Kurt (2001)
- Chunkydonkey (2001) (TV series)
- Hank and Mike (2000)
- Y B Normal? (1998) (TV series)
