= Dark Rising =

- Directed by: Andrew Cymek
- Written by: Andrew Cymek; Mihkel Harilaid
- Produced by: Mihkel Harilaid; Brigitte Kingsley
- Production companies: Black Walk; Defiant Empire

Dark Rising is a sword and sorcery adult-oriented franchise of two made-for-television films, a twelve-episode television miniseries and another five-episode television miniseries, from the husband and wife team of Andrew Cymek and Brigitte Kingsley. The franchise is written by creator Cymek, produced by Kingsley and adapted for film and television by executive producer Mihkel Harilaid. The original film in the series, Dark Rising: Bring Your Battle Axe (2007), introduced lead character Summer Vale, played by Kingsley through the entire series of films.

The series continued with the television series Dark Rising: The Savage Tales of Summer Vale (2011), the television film Dark Rising: Summer Strikes Back (2011) and the five-episode television series Dark Rising: Warrior of Worlds (2014). The franchise is a joint production of Harilaid's Black Walk Films and Cymek's Defiant Empire Films.

== Synopsis ==
There are two Earths: our Earth and Dark Earth. Dark Earth is a world of demons and magic. It is in a dimension created at the height of the Roman Empire by a powerful sorcerer, in an attempt to banish demons from our Earth, forever. The franchise follows the exploits of Summer Vale and her allies, as they battle to save humanity. Their fight takes them all over both Earths.

Summer Vale is a half-human half-demon hybrid. When she was a young girl, her father worked on deciphering ancient texts. When he read from the Book of Shadows, a portal opened, and a group of "agents" took his daughter. Summer was experimented on and used by the government to find a way to combine human and demon DNA, in order to win a secret war waged for thousands of years.

== Series releases ==
=== Dark Rising: Bring Your Battle Axe (2007) ===
In a desperate attempt to save his fizzled-out relationship, Jason organizes a camping trip with the help of his best friends: Ricky, a ladies' man who shoots "1-900" commercials, Marlene, a long-time friend and yoga instructor, and Renee, a book worm with a knack for witchcraft.

Each for their own reasons, they convince Jasmine to join them for a weekend of fun in the sun. Unknown to the group, Renee has been having recurring nightmares of Summer Vale, a girl from their town, who disappeared over twenty years earlier. Renee decides to contact Summer's spirit during the camping trip. Also unknown to the boys, Jasmine and Marlene have become a hot item. They join in the fun and humor Renee's interest in magic.

Using the Book of Shadows, which she received from a mysterious bookkeeper, Renee chants a translated phrase. This opens a portal, and a Kellipoth demon enters, killing Marlene and biting Jasmine. Summer Vale is also transported back. She has lost her memories and is now a demon warrior princess.

Jason and Summer form an uneasy bond. They decide to reopen the portal, to return the demon to Dark Earth.

The Kellipoth bite infects Jasmine, making her a member of the Kingdom of Shells -- demon-like beings without a soul. Jason kills Jasmine but it is too late to save his best friend, as Ricky also succumbs to the Kellipoth. In the ferocious battle, Summer, Jason, and Renee manage to open the portal. Summer kills Demon-Ricky, the Kellipoth breaks Renee's neck, and Jason and Summer force the Kellipoth back through the portal. Jason makes the heroic sacrifice of entering the portal with the Kellipoth, allowing Summer to remain on Earth.

Reintegrating proves difficult for Summer. She can only find work as a model for "1-900" commercials. But her misery is brief. Jason, dressed as a Demon-hunter, returns for her help against an army of Kellipoths. At the bleakest point, the Agency offers help.

==== Featuring ====
Starring	As
Landy Cannon	Jason Parks
Jay Reso	Ricky
Brigitte Kingsley	Summer Vale
Julia Schneider	Renee Phillips

==== Crew ====
Created By	Andrew Cymek
Writer	Andrew Cymek
Producer	Brigitte Kinsgley
Cinematographer	Brad Smith
Music Composers	Marty Beecroft and Joe Heslip
Editor	Andrew Cymek

==== Reception ====
Scott Foy of Dread Central rated it 2/5 stars and wrote, "What we have here is a handsome-looking, low budget production with an attractive cast who seem up to the task but everyone’s hard work is scuttled by a script that comedically isn’t anywhere as hip or witty as it thinks it is and plot-wise borders on complete gibberish." David Johnson of DVD Verdict wrote, "Slow parts aside, Dark Rising is big fun, wallowing in the excesses of B-movie." Adam Tyner of DVD Talk rated it 2/5 stars and compared it negatively to Army of Darkness.

==== Nominations ====
The film was nominated for a record six Canadian Comedy Awards in 2008, in the categories of Best Writing (Cymek), Best Direction (Cymek), Best Actress (Kingsley and Schneider) and Best Actor (Cannon and Reso).

=== Dark Rising: The Savage Tales of Summer Vale (2011) ===
The Savage Tales of Summer Vale is a series of twelve half-hour television episodes. The series follows the continuing exploits of Demon Slayer Summer Vale and her entourage of misfits as they try to save the world each week from imminent destruction.

Having grown up in the demon dimension and enduring years of underground government training, Summer is finally back home and struggling to adjust to her new surroundings. She is recruited to head a government covert agency which, unknown to her, has its own agenda. Summer meets with a mysterious group calling themselves The Dark Shadows Club. They warn of her upcoming battle with The Dark Lord and how all of existence hangs in the balance, but not everything is what it seems.

==== Featuring ====
Starring	As
Brigitte Kingsley	Summer Vale
Landy Cannon	Jason Parks
Matti McLean	Kevin Weeber
Danielle Baker	Temura
Katherine Collett	Laura

==== Crew ====
Director	Andrew Cymek
Writer	Andrew Cymek
Producer	Brigitte Kingsley
Original Music	James Chapple, Graeme Cornies, David Brian Kelly, Brian L. Pickett
Cinematographer	Andrew Cymek
Editor	Andrew Cymek
Series Music	Mike Ell and Josh Zandman

=== Dark Rising: Summer Strikes Back (2011) ===
Also known as Agency of Vengeance: Dark Rising, the made-for-television film takes place two years after Jason Parks saved Princess Summer Vale from her life hunting Kellipoths in the Demon dimension. A sudden surge of supernatural activity and violent attacks resurface on Earth beyond the normal parameters. The two must once again join together to save the world. The Rising Dark Agency, a black ops division of the Government headed by Colonel Haggerd, suspects that the mystic strikes are the work of Mardock, an evil Demon-God capable of destroying worlds. The entire Agency is on high alert but there's more to the story than they know. With the help of field agent Holly, Jason's new partner Daniel, and half-demon Bulo, Summer and Jason set out to solve the mystery of Mardock and prevent the coming apocalypse. But no one is prepared for whom they find behind the Dark Lord's ascension.

==== Featuring ====
Starring	As
Brigitte Kingsley	Summer Vale
Landy Cannon	Jason Parks
Mike "Nug" Nahrgang	Bulo
Julia Schneider	Renee Phillips
Cory Lee	Holly
Michael Ironside	Colonel Hagger
Lauren Williams	Rosemary Black
Kyle Buchanan	Daniel Evans
Matti McLean	Kevin Weeber
Andrew Cymek	Kyle

==== Crew ====
Director	Andrew Cymek
Writer	Andrew Cymek
Producer	Brigitte Kingsley
Original Music	James Chapple, Graeme Cornies, David Brian Kelly (as David Kelly), Brian L. Pickett
Cinematographer	Andrew Cymek
Visual Effects	Doug Lentz - Visual Effects Supervisor; Andrew Cymek
Music Composers	Mike Ell; Josh Zandman

==== Soundtrack ====
Track	Artist
Quite	squint
Shadow Shadow	squint
I'll Be All Right	Steve Mayone
Amazing	Josh Zandman
Shadow	Sarah Lewis
Tonight	Monica Grace Schroeder
Cold Sunshine	Jordan Reaves Critz
Beside You	Marianas Trench
You're So Amazing	Lower Back Tatti

=== Dark Rising: Warrior of Worlds (2014) ===
The franchise returned in 2014 with a brief five-episode television series. There are two Earths: our Earth, a place where magic and demons are things of folklore and legend, and Dark Earth, a dimension created at the height of the Roman Empire by the sorcerer Aramas using the Tether, a powerful device of his own creation. His intention was to exile magic and usher in a new age of man. His plan almost succeeded.

The Tether, the key to keeping the dimensions separate, has remained hidden on our Earth for two millennia. Now it has been found in a small northern town by Nacelle, a demon underlord. Sckraab, his lord and father, plans to use the Tether to open a permanent portal across the Void between the Earths and conquer both worlds.

Before the Demons get to the Tether, a young miner, Nathan Mallstrom, stumbles upon the artifact during one of his shifts. Caught in the imminent battle for the Earth’s future, Nathan joins with Summer Vale, a super soldier with Demon DNA who is dealing with her own clouded past. The two, along with Nathan’s sister Gwen and Summer's sidekick Bulo, try to unlock the mystery of the Tether and fight to protect the world from a Demonic army.

==== Featuring ====
Starring	As
Brigitte Kingsley	Summer Vale
Mike "Nug" Nahrgang	Bulo
Jacob Blair	Nathan Mallstrom
Vanessa Broze	Gwen Mallstrom
Mishael Morgan	Nancy Leighton
Colin Mochrie	Nacelle "The Nefarious"
Adrienne Merrell	Sheila Stanton
Scott Thompson	Sckraab
Peter Outerbridge	Aramas
Art Hindle	Davidath Galba Julius
Lauren "Angelina Love" Williams	Rosemary Black
Brian Krause	Bob Danton
Jeremy London	Marton
Matti McLean	Kevin Weeber

==== Crew ====
Director	Andrew Cymek
Writers	Mihkel Harilaid; Andrew Cymek
Producer	Craig Fleming
Cinematographer	Rhett Morita
Editor	Andrew Cymek; Andrew Kowalchuk
