= Little Rosey =

Canadian-American animated television series

- Created by: Roseanne Barr
- Voices of: Kathleen Laskey; Noam Zylberman; Paulina Gillis; Lisa Yamanaka; Judy Marshak; Tony Daniels; Stephen Bednarski
- Opening theme: Theme music
- Ending theme: Theme music (instrumental)
- Countries of origin: Canada; United States
- Original language: English
- No. of seasons: 1
- No. of episodes: 13

Production
- Executive producers: Roseanne Barr; Tom Arnold
- Producers: Michael Hirsh; Patrick Loubert; Clive A. Smith
- Running time: 30 minutes
- Production companies: Nelvana; Little Rosey Productions, Inc.

Original release
- Network: ABC
- Release: September 8 – December 22, 1990

Little Rosey is an animated television series produced by Nelvana. The series first aired on ABC (part of its Saturday morning block) in 1990. It was Roseanne Barr's first attempt at a cartoon.

== Plot ==
Loosely based on Roseanne Barr's childhood, the series revolved around a young 8-year-old Rosey and her best friend Buddy. The two would then use their imaginations to overcome the obstacles they faced, such as spelling bees, family vacations, and rules that their parents forced upon them. Among the recurring characters were Rosey's parents; her younger sisters Tess and Nonnie; her baby brother Tater; and a pair of nemesis science nerds.

== Production ==
In 1990, this animated series aired late in the day on ABC's Saturday morning lineup. Two years later, an animated special called The Rosey and Buddy Show was produced as a primetime special that aired on May 15, 1992, in which Rosey and Buddy invade Cartoonland to take on the meddling executives who wanted to "change their show". The special only aired once because of licensing complications, which involved the appearance of multiple other animated properties under a limited license, including Tom and Jerry, Beetlejuice, Betty and Veronica and The Care Bears.

== Cast ==
- Kathleen Laskey as Rosey is based on Roseanne Barr
- Roseanne Arnold as Rosey (The Rosey and Buddy Show)
- Noam Zylberman as Buddy, similar to Dan Conner in Roseanne.
- Tom Arnold as Buddy (The Rosey and Buddy Show)
- Paulina Gillis as Tess who is similar Jackie Harris from Roseanne, Additional voices (The Rosey and Buddy Show)
- Lisa Yamanaka as Nonnie and Tater
- Judy Marshak as Rosey's mother
- Tony Daniels as Rosey's father
- Steven Bednarski as Jeffrey and Matthew

=== Guest stars ===
- Eva Almos as Swift Heart Rabbit from The Care Bears Family (The Rosey and Buddy Show)
- Richard Binsley (The Rosey and Buddy Show)
- Len Carlson (The Rosey and Buddy Show)
- Luba Goy as Treat Heart Pig and Lotsa Heart Elephant from The Care Bears Family (The Rosey and Buddy Show)
- Paul Haddad (The Rosey and Buddy Show)
- Dan Hennessey as Brave Heart Lion from The Care Bears Family (The Rosey and Buddy Show)
- Ellen-Ray Hennessy (The Rosey and Buddy Show)
- Roy Kenner (The Rosey and Buddy Show)
- Keith Knight (The Rosey and Buddy Show)
- Stephen Ouimette as Beetlejuice (The Rosey and Buddy Show)
- Ron Rubin (The Rosey and Buddy Show)
- John Stocker (The Rosey and Buddy Show)
- Maria Vacratsis (The Rosey and Buddy Show)

== Episodes ==
Each episode consisted of two 11-minute segments.

No.	Title	Original release date
1	"Farewell, My Dolly" "Super Rosey (Part 1)"	September 8, 1990
2	"Rosey and the Genie" "Explorers"	September 15, 1990
3	"Land of the Lost Toys" "Magic Woods"	September 22, 1990
4	"New People" "Flower Garden"	September 29, 1990
5	"Pirates" "The Snowman"	October 6, 1990
6	"The Cake" "Super Rosey (Part 2)"	October 13, 1990
7	"Of Mice and Rosey"	October 20, 1990
8	"The Pumpkins Are Gone!"	October 27, 1990
9	"It's Under the Bed"	November 3, 1990
10	"It's Really Big Out There"	November 10, 1990
11	"The Buddy and the Rosey"	November 17, 1990
12	"Try Not to Lie"	November 24, 1990
13	"Not Rosey, Roseanne"	December 22, 1990
