= Hank and Mike =

- Poster
- Directed by: Matthiew Klinck
- Written by: Paolo Mancini; Thomas Michael
- Produced by: Thomas Michael; Nicholas Tabarrok; Pierre Even
- Starring: Thomas Michael; Paolo Mancini; Joe Mantegna; Chris Klein
- Cinematography: Glen Keenan
- Edited by: Matthiew Klinck
- Music by: Phil Electric
- Release dates: January 2008 (NATPE NextGen Film Festival); March 27, 2009 (Canada)
- Running time: 86 minutes
- Country: Canada
- Language: English

Hank and Mike is a 2008 comedy film directed by Matthiew Klinck, from a screenplay written by Paolo Mancini and Thomas Michael. The film tells the story of two blue-collar Easter Bunnies who get fired and try their hand at an assortment of odd jobs.

The film premiered in 2008 at the NATPE NextGen Film Festival and was slated for general audience release on October 24, 2008 in the United States. The film was released in Canada on March 27, 2009.

== Plot ==
Two blue-collar Easter Bunnies get fired and try their hand at an assortment of odd jobs, failing at each. Fighting depression, debt and eventually each other, their lives start to unravel until they realize that without their job they are nothing.

== Cast ==
- Thomas Michael as Hank
- Paolo Mancini as Mike
- Chris Klein as Conrad Hubriss
- Joe Mantegna as Mr. Pan
- Maggie Castle as Lena
- Tony Nappo as Stu
- Jane McLean as Brenda
- Cynthia Amsden as Really curious office worker
- Sandra Ardagna as Chic Office Worker
- Andre Arruda as Luiz
- Boyd Banks as Leon
- Ho Chow as Phil
- Jonathan Collard as Keen Co-worker
- Tarah Consoli as Depressed Skinny Girl
- Tim Dorsch as Arty Guy
- Louis Durand as Graham
- Dawne Furey as Athena
- Derek Gilroy as Liam
- Michael Hanrahan as Jenkins
- David Huband as Mr. Sulsky

== Production ==
The characters of the two Easter bunnies named Hank and Mike originally appeared in the TV series Y B Normal? Shooting began on February 1, 2007 in an abandoned Canadian Tire store in Toronto, Ontario.

== Release ==
The film premiered in 2007 at the Vancouver International Film Festival and was slated for general audience release on October 24, 2008 in the United States. The film was released in Canada on March 27, 2009.

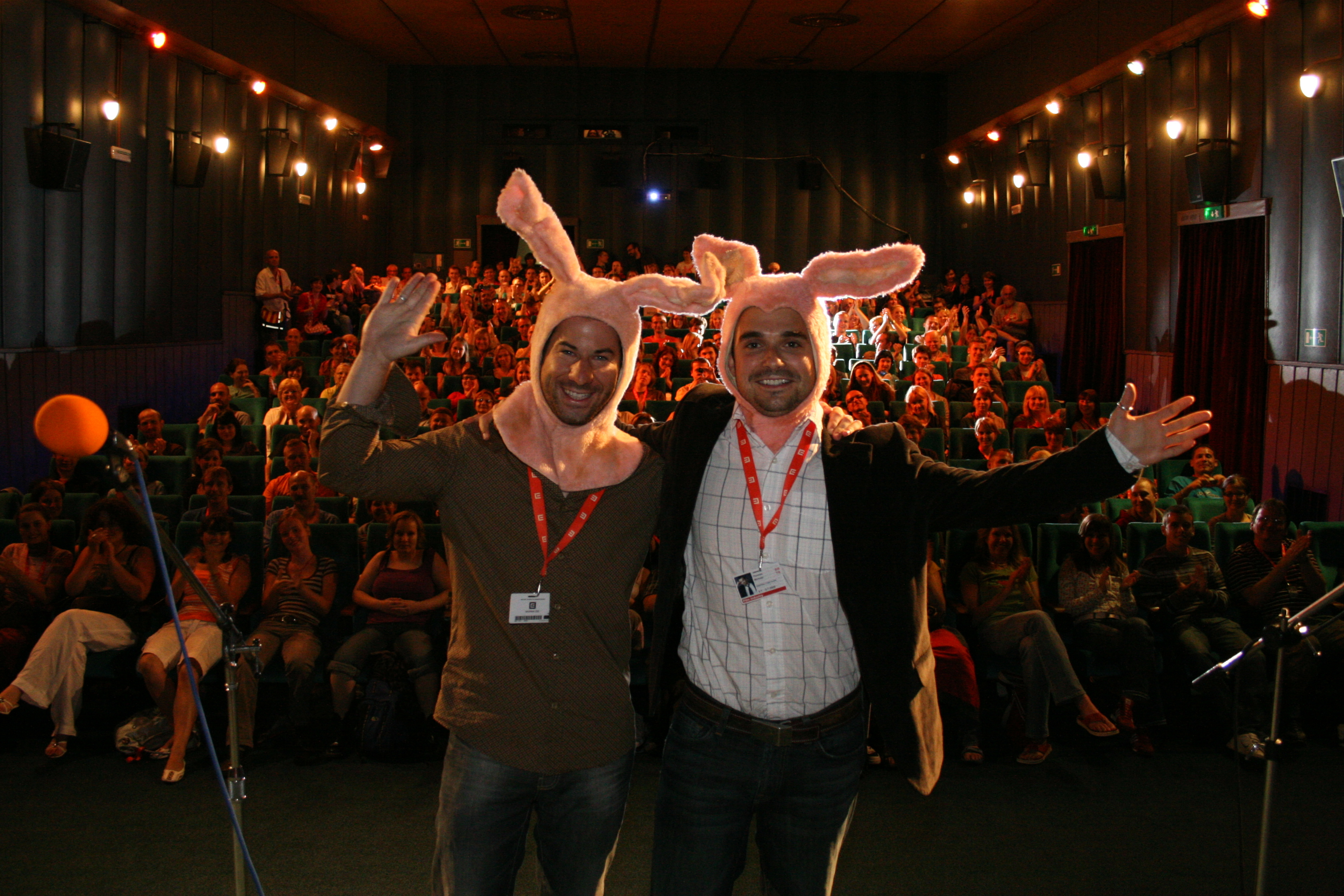
Matthiew Klinck and Thomas Michael introducing Hank and Mike at 43rd KVIFF

== Festivals ==
- Karlovy Vary International Film Festival
- CineVegas
- Palm Beach International Film Festival
- Vancouver International Film Festival
- Victoria International Film Festival
- Seattle's True Independent Film Festival
- Hoboken International Film Festival
- Canadian Film Festival

== See also ==
- List of Easter films
