= Edsville =

- Directed by: Alan Marr
- Written by: Stuart Clow; Alan Marr; James O'Regan
- Produced by: James O'Regan
- Starring: Stuart Clow; Kathleen Laskey
- Cinematography: Harry Lake
- Edited by: David Hicks; John Karolidis; Olaf Relitzki
- Music by: Mark Hukezalie; Rick Shurman
- Production company: A Really Big Production
- Distributed by: First Run Features
- Release date: 1990
- Running time: 14 minutes
- Country: Canada
- Language: English

Edsville is a Canadian horror comedy short film, directed by Alan Marr and released in 1990.

== Plot ==
The film stars Stuart Clow and Kathleen Laskey as Paul and Paula, a couple whose trip to a rural antique auction unexpectedly leads them into a town populated entirely by Ed Sullivan impersonators — and it appears to be a communicable disease which Paul and Paula themselves are at risk of contracting.

== Release ==
The film premiered at the 1990 Festival of Festivals. It was subsequently screened theatrically under a unique model for short films, which made it the first short film in Canadian history to earn independent theatrical revenue; instead of screening before a feature film as short films commonly did in that era, it was screened following Guy Maddin's feature film Archangel, and patrons were given the option of paying an extra dollar if they wanted to see Edsville. It was also broadcast on CBC Television in 1992.

== Awards ==
The film received a Genie Award nomination for Best Theatrical Short Film at the 12th Genie Awards in 1991.
