= Peep and the Big Wide World =

Canadian-American animated preschool children's TV show

- Also known as: Peep
- Genre: Educational; Children's television series Comedy
- Created by: Kaj Pindal
- Directed by: Rick Marshall
- Voices of: Scott Beaudin (seasons 1–3); Shawn Molko (season 4); Maxwell Uretsky (season 5); Jamie Watson; Amanda Soha
- Narrated by: Joan Cusack
- Theme music composer: Steve D'Angelo; Terry Tompkins
- Opening theme: "Peep and the Big Wide World" performed by Taj Mahal
- Ending theme: "Peep and the Big Wide World" (instrumental)
- Composers: Steve D'Angelo; Terry Tompkins
- Countries of origin: Canada; United States
- Original language: English
- No. of seasons: 5
- No. of episodes: 60 (120 segments + 120 live-action segments)

Production
- Executive producer: Kate Taylor
- Producers: Vince Commisso; Marisa Wolsky
- Running time: 22–25 minutes
- Production companies: WGBH Boston; 9 Story Entertainment; Eggbox LLC; National Film Board of Canada

Original release
- Network: TVOKids (Canada); Discovery Kids/TLC (seasons 1–3) (U.S.); PBS Kids (seasons 4–5) (U.S.)
- Release: April 12, 2004 – September 14, 2007 (seasons 1–3)
- Release: February 2, 2010 – October 14, 2011 (seasons 4–5)

Peep and the Big Wide World is an animated television series for preschoolers aged 3-5, created by Danish-Canadian animator Kaj Pindal. It revolves around the lives of three anthropomorphic birds named Peep, Chirp, and Quack, as they discover, investigate, and explore the world around them.

The show was based on the 1988 short film of the same name produced by the National Film Board of Canada, which itself is based on the 1962 short film The Peep Show, also produced by the National Film Board of Canada. The series premiered on April 12, 2004, on Discovery Kids and on TLC as part of their Ready Set Learn! children's block in the United States, and on TVOKids in Canada. It was produced by WGBH in Boston (through its kids division WGBH Kids), 9 Story Media Group (formerly 9 Story Entertainment; in its debut production), Eggbox LLC, the National Film Board of Canada in association with TVOntario and Discovery Kids and is distributed by Alliance Atlantis (through AAC Kids for the first season).

Throughout its run, it was underwritten by the National Science Foundation, with Northrop Grumman underwriting season four in 2010.

Each episode consists of two 9-minute stories, which are animated segments, and two 2-minute live-action segments, in which children explore and demonstrate the same topic presented in the animated segment. The show is narrated by Joan Cusack and the background music is produced by Steve D' Angelo and Terry Tompkins.

== Overview ==
Viewers follow Peep, Chirp, and Quack as they investigate and explore the world around them. Following the 9-minute animated episode, there is a 2-minute live-action segment which features children exploring and demonstrating the same topic presented in the episode. The animation consists of bright colors, 2D, 3D and simple shapes, which simulates and reflects a youthful art style.

== Characters ==
Attributed to the following sources:

=== Main ===
- Peep (voiced by Scott Beaudin in seasons 1–3, Shawn Molko in season 4 and Maxwell Uretsky in season 5) is a male, yellow chicken who is very curious. He is the youngest bird of the group. The show's title is derived from his name. However, Peep is female in the original short film.
- Chirp (voiced by Amanda Soha) is a female, red robin who is also very curious, and attempts frequently to fly, with unsatisfying results, until "A Daring Duck", when she flies to the ground. In "Big Bird", she meets an adult robin for the first time. She is Peep and Quack's best friend. However, Chirp is male in the original short film.
- Quack (voiced by Jamie Watson) is a male, eggplant purple duck who wears a white sailor's hat. He is older than Peep and Chirp, as they are still chicks. He frequently boasts about himself and ducks as a whole, and unwittingly makes many discoveries. Quack is purple in the original short film and is now referred to as blue, but is still quite indigo. He also seems to have a hoarding issue, as evidenced in the episode "An Inconvenient Tooth, Part 1".
- The Narrator (voiced by Joan Cusack) is an omniscient voice who narrates each episode. She usually remains separate from the action, but occasionally, the characters are shown to be able to hear her and will interact with her.

=== Minor ===
- Ant (voiced by Rob Tinkler) is a very busy male ant who is leader of the ants.
- Bat (voiced by Ron Rubin in season 1 and Ron Pardo in season 2) is a very shy bat.
- Beaver Boy (voiced by Tessa Marshall in seasons 1–3 and Amanda Gryniewski in seasons 4–5) is a young naïve male beaver who lives in an adjoining pond to Quack's pond. He appears in several episodes. His desire to please his mom and dad often results in him chewing down too many trees. He often calls Quack "Blue Sailor", Peep "Yellow Guy", and Chirp "Red Round".
- Beaver Dad (voiced by Phillip Williams) is Beaver Boy's businesslike father.
- Beaver Mom (voiced by Kathleen Laskey in season 1 and Debra McGrath seasons 2–3) is Beaver Boy's workaholic mother.
- Blue Jays (voiced by David Huband and Kathleen Laskey for male and female, resp.) are very silly blue and white birds who love to cause lots of trouble when they see stuff.
- Bunnies (voiced by Melanie Tonello, Raquel Cadilha, Alexander Conti, resp. in seasons 1–2; Avigail Humphreys and Riele Downs in seasons 4–5) are inhabitants who live in rabbit holes. In season 1, three bunnies who lived in a rabbit hole became Peep's friends in "Peep in Rabbitland". In season 4, five bunnies are aided by Peep and Quack to find their bunnysitter in "You Can Count on Bunnies".
- Bunnysitter (voiced by Jake Sim) is a bunny who babysits the 5 bunnies.
- Dragonfly (voiced by Catherine Disher) is a quiet dragonfly.
- Fish (voiced by John McGrath in season 1 and Robert Tinkler in season 2) are cohabitations of Quack's pond.
- Fish Jr. (voiced by Phoebe McAuley in seasons 1–2 and Sarah Commisso in season 3) is the youngest fish in the pond and Quack's best fish friend.
- Frog (voiced by Rob Tinkler) is a frog who lives in Quack's pond. He mostly just says "ribbit" but in episodes such as "Sounds Like..." and "Hide and Go Peep", he is heard talking. He is light green in early episodes, but in later episodes, he is a more darker green. Frog is frequently seen sitting on a lily pad in the pond.
- Groundhog (voiced by Rachel Marcus) is a young groundhog destined to find her shadow.
- Old Groundhog (voiced by Adrian Truss) is the oldest of all groundhogs.
- Hoot (voiced by Corinne Conley) is a menacing, but kind purple female owl who lives in the Deep Dark Woods.
- "Me" Tiny Ant (voiced by Erica Commisso) is the tiniest ant in the anthill. "Me" was named after a misinterpretation from Peep.
- Nellie (voiced by Marium Carvell) is a red female dog who acts as a seemingly maternal figure for the birds.
- Newton (voiced by Colin Fox) is an old, male, dark-green turtle who lives under an apple tree. He is a friend to Peep, Chirp, and Quack.
- Quack #2 (voiced by Megan Mullally) is a female duck who has her own pond, built by Quack, Peep, Chirp, Beaver Boy and his parents, and Quack's pink doppelgänger. Like Quack, Quack #2 is boastful and narcissistic, but unlike Quack, Quack #2 is annoying, cruel, and bad-intentioned.
- Rabbit (voiced by Jayne Eastwood) is an excitable and somewhat distracted rabbit.
- Raccoon (voiced by Jeff Lumby) is a gobbo, male brown & black raccoon who has lots of rubbish.
- Robins (voiced by Kathleen Laskey and Holly Hunter respectively) are two individual robins with differentiating personalities. One is a blue robin who flies around giving Chirp pep talks and comes from "Chirp Builds a Nest". Another is an adult robin who appears in "Big Bird" and "Chirp Flies the Coop".
- Skunk (voiced by Adrian Truss) is a rather deadpan skunk who lives near Quack's pond.
- Snail (voiced by Laura Lynn) is a pondweller in Quack's pond.
- Spider (voiced by Marium Carvell) is a smart and sneaky spider.
- Splendid Bird from Paradise (voiced by Jabella A. Urrejola-Lugo) is a green bird who was captured from the jungle, adopted by a little girl and found her way in the Big Wide World.
- Squeak (voiced by Kathleen Laskey) is an anxious pink, female mouse who lives under a brick and always worries a lot about what could go wrong.
- Squirrel (voiced by Peter Wildman) is a brown squirrel with a long tail who favors acorns.
- Tom (voiced by Alex Hood in season 1 and Matthew Knight in season 2) is a sly, male blue cat with black stripes who often tries to eat Peep, Chirp, and Quack. He is the sole antagonist.

== Episodes ==
Season	Episodes	Originally released	
Season	Episodes	First released	Last released
1	26	April 12, 2004	May 17, 2004
2	13	May 2, 2005	September 27, 2006
3	10	April 16, 2007	September 14, 2007
4	6	February 2, 2010	July 17, 2010
5	5	October 10, 2011	October 14, 2011

=== Season 1 (2004) ===
No. overall	No. in season	Segment names	Original release date	Prod. code
1	1	"Spring Thing"	April 12, 2004	110
1	1	"Springy Thingy"	April 12, 2004	110
2	2	"A Duck's Tale"	April 13, 2004	101
2	2	"Quack's Tracks"	April 13, 2004	101
3	3	"Quack and the Very Big Rock"	April 14, 2004	102
3	3	"Shadow Play"	April 14, 2004	102
4	4	"Current Events"	April 15, 2004	103
4	4	"Quack Loses His Hat"	April 15, 2004	103
5	5	"Night Light"	April 16, 2004	104
5	5	"Sounds Like..."	April 16, 2004	104
6	6	"The Windy Day"	April 19, 2004	105
6	6	"Peep Feet"	April 19, 2004	105
7	7	"Newton's Big Adventure"	April 20, 2004	106
7	7	"Peep Crosses the Road"	April 20, 2004	106
8	8	"Stormy Weather"	April 21, 2004	107
8	8	"Peep in Rabbitland"	April 21, 2004	107
9	9	"Quack's Stuck Stick"	April 22, 2004	108
9	9	"Peep's Can"	April 22, 2004	108
10	10	"Under Duck"	April 23, 2004	109
10	10	"All Fall Down"	April 23, 2004	109
11	11	"The Perils of Peep and Chirp"	April 26, 2004	111
11	11	"Hoop Tricks"	April 26, 2004	111
12	12	"Save It for Later"	April 27, 2004	112
12	12	"The Red Ballmoon"	April 27, 2004	112
13	13	"Chirp Builds a Nest"	April 28, 2004	113
13	13	"Stuck Duck"	April 28, 2004	113
14	14	"The Real Decoy"	April 29, 2004	114
14	14	"Peep's Lost Leaf"	April 29, 2004	114
15	15	"Birds of a Feather"	April 30, 2004	115
15	15	"The Incredible Shrinking Duck"	April 30, 2004	115
16	16	"Go West Young Peep"	May 3, 2004	116
16	16	"A Delicate Balance"	May 3, 2004	116
17	17	"The Fish Museum"	May 4, 2004	117
17	17	"Peep's Night Out"	May 4, 2004	117
18	18	"There's No Place Like Home"	May 5, 2004	118
18	18	"Flipping Newton"	May 5, 2004	118
19	19	"Chirp's Flight Program"	May 6, 2004	119
19	19	"Mirror Mirror in the Dump"	May 6, 2004	119
20	20	"Bridge the Gap"	May 7, 2004	120
20	20	"Meeting Half-Way"	May 7, 2004	120
21	21	"Peep Plants a Seed"	May 10, 2004	121
21	21	"The Root Problem"	May 10, 2004	121
22	22	"Hide and Go Peep"	May 11, 2004	122
22	22	"A Peep of a Different Color"	May 11, 2004	122
23	23	"That's a Cat"	May 12, 2004	123
23	23	"Faster Than a Duck"	May 12, 2004	123
24	24	"Quack Hatches an Egg"	May 13, 2004	124
24	24	"The Whatchamacallit"	May 13, 2004	124
25	25	"Wandering Beaver"	May 14, 2004	125
25	25	"Peep's New Friend"	May 14, 2004	125
26	26	"The Trip to Green Island"	May 17, 2004	126
26	26	"Give Me a Call"	May 17, 2004	126

=== Season 2 (2005–06) ===
No. overall	No. in season	Segment names	Original release date	Prod. code
27	1	"Finders Keepers"	May 2, 2005	201
27	1	"Quack Quiets the Universe"	May 2, 2005	201
28	2	"Peep's Moon Mission"	May 3, 2005	202
28	2	"The Many Moons of Quack the Duck"	May 3, 2005	202
29	3	"The Mystery of the Thing That Went and Came Back"	May 4, 2005	203
29	3	"Peep's Color Quest"	May 4, 2005	203
30	4	"Reflection Affection"	May 5, 2005	204
30	4	"Peep Deep in the Big Muddy"	May 5, 2005	204
31	5	"Chirp Sorts It Out (Sort Of)"	May 6, 2005	205
31	5	"Hear Here!"	May 6, 2005	205
32	6	"Dry Duck"	May 9, 2005	206
33	7	"Snow Daze"	May 10, 2005	207
33	7	"Flower Shower"	May 10, 2005	207
34	8	"Who Stole the Big Wide World?"	May 11, 2005	208
34	8	"M-U-D Spells Trouble"	May 11, 2005	208
35	9	"Finding Time"	May 12, 2005	209
35	9	"Smaller Than a Peep"	May 12, 2005	209
36	10	"Quack Quack"	May 13, 2005	210
36	10	"One Duck Two Many"	May 13, 2005	210
37	11	"Count Them Out"	September 25, 2005	212
37	11	"Peep Prints"	September 25, 2005	212
38	12	"Stick with Me"	September 26, 2005	211
38	12	"Tree Feller"	September 26, 2005	211
39	13	"A Daring Duck"	September 27, 2005	213
39	13	"The Trouble with Bubbles"	September 27, 2005	213

=== Season 3 (2007) ===
No. overall	No. in season	Segment names	Original release date	Prod. code
40	1	"The Tooth, the Whole Tooth, and Nothing But the Tooth"	April 17, 2007	302
40	1	"The Winter of Quack's Discontent"	April 17, 2007	302
41	2	"Nosing Around"	April 18, 2007	303
41	2	"The Last Straw"	April 18, 2007	303
42	3	"The Disappearing Drink"	April 19, 2007	304
42	3	"Door Tour"	April 19, 2007	304
43	4	"In a Bind"	April 20, 2007	305
43	4	"Star Light, Star Bright"	April 20, 2007	305
44	5	"Bedtime Story"	September 11, 2007	306
44	5	"The Deep Duck Woods"	September 11, 2007	306
45	6	"I Spy a Spider"	September 12, 2007	307
45	6	"Robin in the Bat Cave"	September 12, 2007	307
46	7	"Marble Mover"	September 13, 2007	308
46	7	"Fair Shares"	September 13, 2007	308
47	8	"The Feats of Peep"	September 14, 2007	309
47	8	"Quack Goes Nuts"	September 14, 2007	309
48	9	"The Sounds of Silence"	September 16, 2007	301
49	10	"Big Bird"	September 10, 2007	310
49	10	"Chirp Flies the Coop"	September 10, 2007	310

=== Season 4 (2010) ===
No. overall	No. in season	Segment names	Original release date	Prod. code
50	1	"The Lurmies are Coming"	February 2, 2010	406
50	1	"Quack's Square Deal"	February 2, 2010	406
51	2	"An Inconvenient Tooth"	May 1, 2010	401
52	3	"Bringing Spring"	May 13, 2010	403
52	3	"Quack's Pond Party"	May 13, 2010	403
53	4	"You Can Count on Bunnies"	May 14, 2010	405
53	4	"Falling Feathers"	May 14, 2010	405
54	5	"Trading Places"	June 26, 2010	402
54	5	"House of Sand and Frog"	June 26, 2010	402
55	6	"Magic Duck Dancing"	July 17, 2010	404
55	6	"Chirp Chirp Tweet Tweet Chirp"	July 17, 2010	404

=== Season 5 (2011) ===
No. overall	No. in season	Segment names	Original release date	Prod. code
56	1	"Two's a Crowd"	October 10, 2011	501
57	2	"The Road Not Taken"	October 11, 2011	502
58	3	"Soap Opera"	October 12, 2011	503
58	3	"Diva Duck"	October 12, 2011	503
59	4	"Quack and the Amazing Sandy Magic"	October 13, 2011	504
59	4	"Duckball"	October 13, 2011	504
60	5	"Things That Go Peep in the Night"	October 14, 2011	505
60	5	"Mud Muddle"	October 14, 2011	505

== Music composition ==
Music for Peep and the Big Wide World is composed by Terry Tompkins and Steve D'Angelo, from Eggplant. The opening theme is performed by blues musician Taj Mahal.

== Broadcast ==
=== United States ===
Peep and the Big Wide World was originally broadcast on TLC and Discovery Kids — the latter as part of the Ready Set Learn! preschool block — from April 12, 2004, to September 14, 2007. Carriage on the Discovery children's networks ended on October 8, 2010, when Discovery Kids discontinued the block and reruns of the first three seasons to make way for the new network to launch known as The Hub on October 10. WGBH began airing the series on August 1, 2004, and it was later offered to public television stations via independent public television distributor American Public Television from April 1, 2007, to January 3, 2018.

The last two seasons were broadcast exclusively on select local public television stations with episodes distributed by APT from January 4, 2010 to October 14, 2011, though second-runs of previous episodes began as early as April 1, 2007. APT continued distributing reruns until January 3, 2018, well after commercial networks dropped the program. A total of 60 episodes (120 segments) were broadcast.

Beginning on January 1, 2018, distribution and reruns of Peep and the Big Wide World began airing on the 24-hour PBS Kids channel, marking the first time the series aired nationally on PBS Kids. Despite being a production of PBS station WGBH, Peep and the Big Wide World was turned down by PBS in 2003 in favor of developing programming directed at "slightly older children". (The series was geared toward preschool children ages 3–5; meanwhile, PBS eventually launched the PBS Kids Go! block in 2004 which was intended for children above the preschool level.) The U.S. broadcasts of the series ended on December 26, 2021, when it was replaced with reruns of Dinosaur Train at a 7:30 AM weekend morning timeslot.

APT and PBS Kids broadcasts of Peep and the Big Wide World were paired with a short episode from Pocoyo, which aired immediately after each show from 2010 to 2021.

== Media ==
=== Home video ===
WGBH Boston Video released the episodes of the first season on DVD in 2005. The 2005 DVD releases each contained six segments of the specified subject; Peep Explores, Peep Finds, Peep Floats, Peep's New Friends, Chirp Flies, and Quack Knows It All. The 2007 DVD release, Peep Figures It Out contained six segments as usual, plus two bonus segments. In 2011, PBS Kids Video released two DVDs; Seasons of Adventure, and Star Light, Star Bright, which contains episodes from seasons two and three respectively. In 2012, PBS Kids Video released two more DVDs; Finders Keepers and Bringing Spring. In 2014, PBS Kids Video released two more DVDs; Diva Duck, and Peep Discovers (which was once available as a limited release to retail stores). As of 2024, all of these DVDs are now out of print and very hard to find, but commonly found at public libraries. In Canada, Entertainment One released four DVDs in both English and French languages; Quack Quack, Peep's Moon Mission, Stick With Me, and Flower Shower.

=== PBS LearningMedia shorts ===
On July 26, 2017, WGBH released PEEP and the Big Wide World: Weather Factors, a media gallery in PBS LearningMedia's Bringing the Universe to America's Classrooms project. Weather Factors contains 4 animated shorts: "Peep and the Too Windy Day", "Peep and the Chilly Dam", "Peep and the Changing Sky", and "Peep and the Rainy, Snowy Day".
