= Ham & Cheese =

- Theatrical release poster
- Directed by: Warren P. Sonoda
- Produced by: Mihkel Harilaid; P.J. Wilson; Mike Beaver; Jason Jones
- Starring: Mike Beaver; Jason Jones; Samantha Bee
- Cinematography: Brendan Steacy
- Edited by: Andrew Kowalchuk; Warren P. Sonoda; James P. Villeneuve
- Music by: Steve M.
- Release date: 2004
- Country: Canada
- Language: English

Ham & Cheese is a 2004 Canadian comedy film directed by Warren P. Sonoda. The film stars Mike Beaver and Jason Jones. Both of them also wrote and produced it. It is about two talentless actors who attempt to make it in showbiz with persistence, ready to do anything to reach their dreams without letting go.

== Cast ==
- Mike Beaver as Richard Wolanski
- Jason Jones as Barry Goodson
- Samantha Bee as Beth Goodson
- Dave Foley as Tom Brennemen
- Jennifer Baxter as Katie Reed
- Von Flores as A.D. (MOW)
- Scott Thompson as Floyd
- Polly Shannon as Lucy (MOW Detective)
- Boyd Banks as Barry's Boss at Canadian Theatre Company
- Victoria Pratt as Herself
- Ann Bisch as Phyllis
- Catherine Black as Casting Complex Director (Cola)
- Vladimir Jon Cubrt as Ralph
- Adam Reid as Casting Director

== Award nominations ==
The film was nominated in 2005 for six Canadian Comedy Awards as follows:

- Warren P. Sonoda for "Film - Pretty Funny Direction"
- Jennifer Baxter for "Film - Pretty Funny Performance - Female"
- Samantha Bee for "Film - Pretty Funny Performance - Female"
- Mike Beaver for "Film - Pretty Funny Performance - Male"
- Jason Jones for "Film - Pretty Funny Performance - Male"
- Mike Beaver and Jason Jones for "Film - Pretty Funny Writing"
