= Rob Stefaniuk =

Canadian comedian, actor and writer

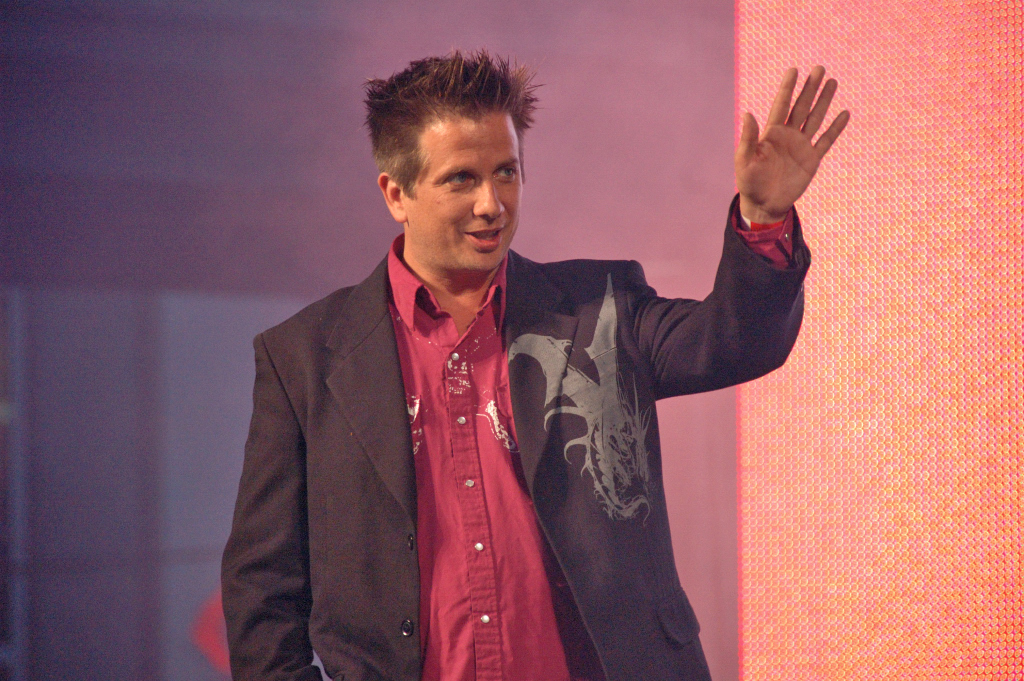
- Stefaniuk at the Toronto International Film Festival premiere of Suck
- Born: Robert Stefaniuk; 1971 (age 53–54); Ontario, Canada
- Occupation(s): Comedian, actor, writer
- Spouse: Barbara Mamabolo (m. 2016)
- Children: 1

Robert Stefaniuk (born 1971) is a Canadian comedian, actor and writer who has worked in numerous television shows and films as both guest actor and series regular. His feature-film acting credits include the Saturday Night Live-inspired Superstar (1999) and Phil the Alien (2004).

== Early life ==
Stefaniuk was born in Ontario to Shirley and Ronald Stefaniuk.

== Career ==
Stefaniuk first appeared during the ill-fated second season of Catwalk replacing Johnny Camden as guitarist. He also appeared in the 1995 short film Love Child which also starred fellow former Catwalk star Neve Campbell. Stefaniuk's first screenplay, The Size of Watermelons, was produced as an independent feature in 1996. In 2003, he was story editor and line producer, and did additional editing, for the independent feature Public Domain, directed by Kris Lefcoe. Shortly thereafter he made his directorial debut with the short comedy film Waiting for the Man, which was an official selection at the Sundance Film Festival in 2005. He subsequently wrote and directed his first feature-length film, Phil the Alien.

From 2003 to 2004, he voiced the character of "Buzz" Sawchuck in Gene Simmons' animated television show My Dad the Rock Star on Teletoon.

Stefaniuk's latest work is the movie Suck, a vampire rock and roll comedy released in 2009 at the Toronto International Film Festival and on DVD in 2010. Stefaniuk writes, directs and stars in the film alongside Dimitri Coats, Jessica Paré, Malcolm McDowell, Iggy Pop, Alice Cooper, Moby, Dave Foley and Henry Rollins.

== Personal life ==
Stefaniuk married Barbara Mamabolo in 2016 where they have one child.

== Voices ==
- Timothy Goes to School - Frank #2
- Moville Mysteries - Luthor's bodyguard
- My Dad the Rock Star - Robert "Buzz" Sawchuck
- Totally Spies! - Diminutive Smalls (Season 4)
- Grossology - Andy
- Spliced - Peri

== Awards ==
- 2005 Don Haig Award
