= Y B Normal? =

- Starring: P-H Dallaire; Matthiew Klinck; Ron Langton; Paolo Mancini; Thomas Michael
- Country of origin: Canada
- No. of episodes: 19 (list of episodes)

Production
- Running time: 23 minutes per episode

Original release
- Network: The Comedy Network
- Release: September 15, 1998 – 1999

Y B Normal? was a Canadian sketch comedy TV show. It originally aired on The Comedy Network between 1998 and 1999.

Its sketches are all set in Aylmer, Quebec.

== Cast ==
- P-H Dallaire as various characters
- Matthiew Klinck as various characters
- Ron Langton as various characters
- Paolo Mancini as Mike the easter bunny (season 2, one episode in season 1) and various other characters
- Thomas Michael as Hank the easter bunny (season 2, one episode in season 1) and various other characters

=== Guest cast ===
- Adam F. da Silva
- Steve Baskin
- Leah Chisholm
- Louis Durand

== DVD release summary ==
Title	Ep #	Region 1
Season One	6	TBA
Season Two	13	TBA
