= Medium Raw: Night of the Wolf =

- Written by: Andrew Cymek
- Directed by: Andrew Cymek
- Starring: William B. Davis; John Rhys-Davies; Brigitte Kingsley
- Theme music composer: Emir Isilay; Pinar Toprak
- Country of origin: Canada

Production
- Producer: Brigitte Kingsley
- Cinematography: Brad Smith
- Running time: 100 minutes
- Budget: $1 million

Original release
- Release: August 6, 2010

Medium Raw: Night of the Wolf is a 2010 horror thriller television film directed by Andrew Cymek. The run time is 111 minutes. The film features professional wrestler Andrew “Test” Martin in his final role due to his death in March 2009.

== Plot ==
Capturing the sadistic serial killer "The Wolf" was just the beginning for rookie cop Johnny Morgan. As he escorts the monster to his new home in the dark underground halls of Parker's Asylum, bedlam ensues and Johnny along with a handful of civilians become players in a night of survival against the world's most terrifying inmates.

== Cast ==
- William B. Davis
- John Rhys-Davies
- Brigitte Kingsley
- Andrew Cymek
- Jason Reso
- Mercedes McNab
- Landy Cannon
- Boyd Banks
- Nola Auguston
- Andrew Martin
