= Phil the Alien =

2004 Canadian film

- Theatrical release poster
- Directed by: Rob Stefaniuk
- Written by: Rob Stefaniuk
- Produced by: Craig Fleming
- Starring: Rob Stefaniuk; Nicole de Boer; Graham Greene
- Cinematography: D. Gregor Hagey
- Edited by: Warren P. Sonoda; Rob Stefaniuk
- Music by: John Kastner
- Distributed by: Lions Gate Entertainment
- Release date: September 11, 2004
- Running time: 85 min
- Country: Canada
- Languages: English; French

Phil the Alien is a 2004 Canadian comedy film. It was written and directed by Rob Stefaniuk, who also starred as the titular Phil.

The film's cast also includes Graham Greene, Ingrid Veninger and Joe Flaherty in his final role prior to his death in 2024.

== Plot summary ==
Phil is an extraterrestrial with shape-shifting ability and telekinetic powers. After crash-landing in Northern Ontario, Phil befriends a red neck child, his father, and a talking beaver as he wanders the Canadian wilderness. Phil is soon introduced to the trappings of small town northern Ontario and adopts the persona and mannerisms of a stereotypical Canadian small town alcoholic while hiding from the ineffectual and mentally traumatized military general who is trying to capture him. Hilarity ensues as his telekinetic powers convince some that he is the Christian messiah and soon joins a local rock band as a singer. A cold hearted assassin from Quebec attempts to end his existence as he and the band go out on tour. The ending consists of suspense, treachery, and dolphins.

== Cast ==
- Rob Stefaniuk ... Phil the Alien
- Nicole de Boer ... Madame Madame
- Graham Greene ... Wolf
- Boyd Banks ... Slim
- Christopher Barry ... Thomas
