= Cocktales =

Cocktales may refer to:

- Cocktales (TV series), a television show by the Comedy Network
- Cocktales (song), a 1994 song by Too Short

== See also ==
- Cocktail (disambiguation)
