= ZED.TO =

2012 Alternate reality game in Toronto, Canada

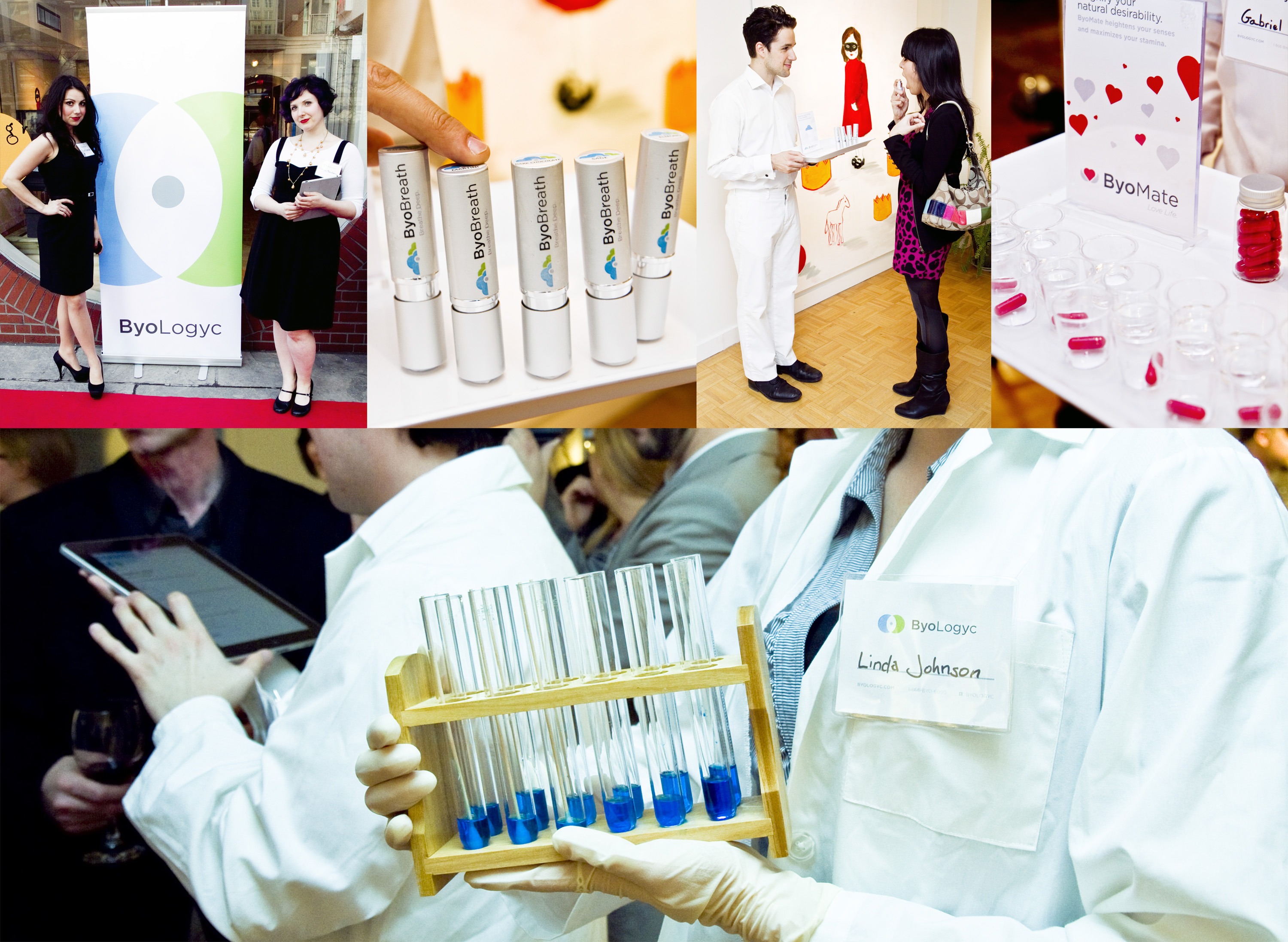
- Introducing ByoLogyc to ZED.TO audiences.
- Other names: ByoLogyc
- Publishers: Toronto design collective The Mission Business
- Publication: 2012
- Genres: Alternate reality game
- Languages: English
- Website: http://zed.to/

ZED.TO was an alternate reality game run in Toronto in 2012. Players assumed roles as interns and employees in a fictional and futuristic biotechnology corporation called ByoLogyc, and experienced the company's rise and disastrous fall first-hand through social media, online videos and websites, and live-action immersive theatrical events.

== Production ==
ZED.TO was produced by Toronto design collective The Mission Business; founded by Elenna Mosoff, Trevor Haldenby, Martha Haldenby, David Fono, and Byron Laviolette and was crowdfunded on indiegogo in 2012.

== Awards ==
ZED.TO won the inaugural Performance Innovation Award at the 2012 Toronto Fringe Festival, as well as Best In Show at the 2012 World Future Society Beta Launch competition, Best in Biological Design at Autodesk University, and Best in Cross-Platform Fiction at the 2012 Digi Awards.

== Cast ==
- Andrew Moyes - Chet Getram
- Liam Toshio Morris - Davian Baxter
- Karen Donald - Bernice Hammersmith
- Emily Schooley - Dahlia Joss
- James Fanizza - Tyler Wyatt
- Janet Kish - Rentata Reinger
- Caitlin B. Driscoll - Marie LeClerc
- Kwan Ho Tse - Henry Chan
- Burton Wright - Brad Mitchell
- Ariana Leask - Adrian Quinn
- Shane Hollon - Dennis Kirkham
- Martha Haldenby - Olive Swift
- Adam Barrett - Paul Fischer
- Jennifer Walls - Felicity Chapman
