= Girls Will Be Girls =

Girls Will Be Girls may refer to:

- Girls Will Be Girls (1980 film), a film directed by Mariano Laurenti
- Girls Will Be Girls (2003 film), a film directed by Richard Day
- Girls Will Be Girls (2024 film), an Indo-French coming-of-age drama film
- Girls Will Be Girls (TV series), a television show on The Comedy Network
- Girls Will Be Girls (Farmer's Daughter album), 1993
- Girls Will Be Girls (Klymaxx album), 1982
- Girls Will Be Girls (EP), by Itzy, 2025
- Girls Will Be Girls (song), by Itzy, 2025

== See also ==
- Boys Will Be Boys (disambiguation)
