= List of programs broadcast by CTV Comedy Channel =

This is a list of television programs formerly, and currently broadcast by the Canadian television channel CTV Comedy Channel and previously The Comedy Network.

== Current and upcoming programming ==
This is a list of programs currently being broadcast regularly and irregularly, as of April 2026.

=== Original ===
- Roast Battle Canada (October 11, 2021-present)
- Acting Good

=== British-Originated Programming ===
- Saturday Night Live UK

=== Repeats ===
- The Big Bang Theory
- Cash Cab
- Children Ruin Everything
- The Conners
- Corner Gas
- Corner Gas Animated
- Friends
- The King of Queens
- Shifting Gears
- St. Denis Medical
- Young Sheldon

== Former programming ==
=== Acquired from Hulu ===
- Crossing Swords

=== Acquired from Comedy Central ===
- Good Talk with Anthony Jeselnik
- Klepper
- Lights Out with David Spade
- Comedy Central Roast (special)

=== Acquired from TBS ===
- Chad
- Miracle Workers

=== Acquired from TruTV ===
- It's Personal with Amy Hoggart
- Tacoma FD

=== A-E ===
- Aaagh! It's the Mr. Hell Show!
- The Abbott and Costello Show
- Absolutely Fabulous
- Adam Devine's House Party
- After Hours (aka After Hours with Kenny Robinson) (original program)
- Air Farce
- Alice, I Think (original program)
- American Body Shop'
- Angie Tribeca
- The Assistant
- @Midnight
- BattleBots
- Beat the Geeks
- The Beaverton
- Benched
- Bizarre
- Blue Collar TV
- Bob and Margaret (original program ran from 2000 until 2017)
- The Bobroom
- Bounty Hunters
- Broad City
- Brockmire
- Butch Patterson: Private Dick (original program)
- Buzz (after Buzz's run on Rogers TV)
- Canadian Comedy Shorts (original program)
- Celebrity Deathmatch
- Chappelle's Show
- Cheers
- Clipped
- Cocktales
- The Colbert Report
- Comedy at Club 54
- Comedy Central Presents
- Comedy Central Roast
- Comedy Inc. (CTV production)
- The Comedy Jam
- Comedy Now!
- Comics!
- Community
- CON
- Cold as Balls
- Dan for Mayor
- The Detour
- Diff'rent Strokes
- The Dish Show
- Drawn Together
- Distraction (UK and US versions)
- Dog Bites Man
- Double Exposure
- The Download
- Dr. Katz Professional Therapist
- Drunk History
- Elvira Kurt: Adventures in Comedy (original program)
- Everybody Loves Raymond
- Extras

=== F-J ===
- The Facts of Life
- Fawlty Towers
- Frasier
- Freak Show
- French and Saunders
- Fresh Off the Boat
- Full Frontal with Samantha Bee
- George Street TV (original program)
- Girls Will Be Girls (original program)
- The Goldbergs
- Good Morning World (original program)
- The Gorburger Show
- Ground Floor
- Gutterball Alley (original program)
- The Half Hour
- Halifax Comedy Festival
- Happy Tree Friends
- Hiccups
- The High Court with Doug Benson
- History Bites
- The Honeymooners
- Hotbox
- Hot in Cleveland
- House Party
- Home Economics
- I Love Lucy
- Important Things with Demetri Martin
- Impastor
- Improv Heaven and Hell (original program)
- In Living Color
- Inside Amy Schumer
- Internet Slutts
- The Itch (original program)
- It's a Living
- Jeff Ltd. (CTV production)
- Jeff Ross Presents Roast Battle
- The Jeselnik Offensive
- The Jim Gaffigan Show
- The Jim Jefferies Show
- Jimmy Kimmel Live!
- The Joe Blow Show
- Jon Benjamin Has a Van
- The Jon Dore Television Show
- Just for Laughs
- Just for Laughs: All Access
- Just for Laughs Gags
- Just for Laughs: The Lost Tapes

=== K-O ===
- Kathy Griffin: My Life on the D-List
- Kevin Spencer (original program which first aired on CTV, then moved over to Comedy Network)
- Key and Peele
- Keys to the VIP (original program)
- The Kids in the Hall
- The King of Queens
- King of the Hill
- Kroll Show
- Letterkenny
- Lewis Black's Root of All Evil
- Life's a Bitch
- Lil' Bush
- Liocracy
- Live at Gotham
- lol :-)
- Mad About You (2019 revival for American cable system Spectrum)
- MADtv
- Mama's Family
- The Man Show
- Match Game (new English-language version recorded in Montreal in 2012)
- Men at Work
- Mike & Molly
- Mind of Mencia-
- Monty Python's Flying Circus
- Mr. Show with Bob and David
- My Boys
- My Name Is Earl
- Modern Family (still part of CTV's Library just not on CTV Comedy no longer)
- Newhart
- Newsradio
- The Newsroom
- The Nice Show (original program)
- The Nightly Show with Larry Wilmore
- Odd Job Jack
- The Office (British TV series) (UK)
- The Office (US)
- Only in America with Larry the Cable Guy
- Open Mike with Mike Bullard (co-produced by CTV)
- The Opposition w/ Jordan Klepper
- Outnumbered

=== P-T ===
- Parks and Recreation
- Patti (original program)
- The Phil Silvers Show
- Picnicface (original program)
- Point Blank (original program)
- Popcultured (original program)
- The President Show
- Punched Up (original program)
- Puppets Who Kill (original program)
- The Red Green Show
- Reno 911!
- Review
- The Rick Mercer Report
- Roast Battle
- Robson Arms (CTV production)
- Rockpoint P.D. (original program)
- The Sarah Silverman Program
- Saturday Night Live
- Saturday Night Stand-Up
- SCTV
- Seinfeld
- The Shakespeare Comedy Show (original program)
- The Showbiz Show with David Spade
- The Simple Life: Interns
- The Simpsons
- Sirens
- Sister, Sister
- Sit Down, Shut Up
- Slightly Bent TV (original program)
- Sullivan & Son
- Smack the Pony
- So NoTORIous
- Soap
- South Park
- Spoilers
- Spun Out
- Stand Up and Bite Me (original program)
- Stella
- Steve Harvey's Big Time
- Suburban Shootout
- Supertown Challenge (original program)
- Sushi TV
- Team Sanchez
- This Hour Has 22 Minutes
- This Is Not Happening
- This Sitcom Is...Not to Be Repeated
- Tim and Eric Awesome Show, Great Job!
- The Tom Green Show
- The Tony Danza Show
- Tom Green's House Tonight
- Tosh.0
- Truthhorse
- The Stand-Up Show with Jon Dore

=== U-Z ===
- Ugly Americans
- Up All Night
- Wayne and Shuster
- Welcome to The Captain
- Welcome to Sweden
- What Were They Thinking?
- Whitney
- Whose Line is it Anyway?
- Why? with Hannibal Buress
- Win Ben Stein's Money
- Winnipeg Comedy Festival
- WKRP in Cincinnati
- Workaholics
- Wrecked
- Y B Normal? (original program)
- You Bet Your Ass (original program)
- Yuk Yuk's Great Canadian Laugh Off
