= Boys Will Be Boys =

Boys Will Be Boys may refer to:

== In film and television ==
- Boys Will Be Boys (1921 film), an American comedy film
- Boys Will Be Boys (1935 film), a British comedy film with Will Hay
- Boys Will Be Boys (TV series), name of the revamped American television sitcom Second Chance
- "Boys Will Be Boys", a 1994 episode of ABC Afterschool Special, an American TV series for children
- "Boys Will Be Boys", a 1998 episode of Bear in the Big Blue House, an American TV series for children

== In literature ==
- Boys Will Be Boys, a 1943 book about boys' weeklies by E. S. Turner
- Boys Will Be Boys, a 1963 book by Simon Raven
- Boys Will Be Boys (Miedzian book), a 1991 book by Myriam Miedzian
- Boys Will Be Boys, a 2003 biography of Z. A. Suleri by his daughter Sara Suleri Goodyear
- Boys Will Be Boys, a 2008 book on the Dallas Cowboys by Jeff Pearlman
- Boys Will Be Boys, a short story by Ruskin Bond
- Boys Will Be Boys (Ford book), a 2018 book by Clementine Ford

== In music ==
=== Artists/Groups ===
- Boys Will Be Boys (Tiësto, Angger Dimas and Showtek)

=== Albums ===
- Boys Will Be Boys (Gary Glitter album), 1984
- Boys Will Be Boys!, a 1975 album by Rabbitt
- Boys Will Be Boyz, a 1991 album by Newsboys

=== Songs ===
- "Boys Will Be Boys" (Dua Lipa song), 2020
- "Boys Will Be Boys" (The Choirboys song), 1988
- "Boys Will Be Boys" (The Hooters song), 1993
- "Boys Will Be Boys" (The Ordinary Boys song), 2005
- "Boys Will Be Boys" (Paulina Rubio song), 2012
- "Boys Will Be Boys", a song by Backstreet Boys from their 1996 album Backstreet Boys
- "Boys Will Be Boys", a song by Danger Danger from their 1989 album Danger Danger
- "Boys Will Be Boys", a song by the Gear Daddies from their 1988 album Let's Go Scare Al
- "Boys Will Be Boys", a 2016 song by Miss Benny
- "Boys Will Be Boys", a song by Rock Goddess from their 1987 album Young and Free
- "Boys Will Be Boys", a song by Maureen Steele from her 1985 album Nature of the Beast
- "Boys Will Be Boys", a song by Stella Donnelly from her 2017 EP Thrush Metal and her 2019 album Beware of the Dogs

== See also ==
- Girls Will Be Girls (disambiguation)
