= Cocktail party (disambiguation) =

A cocktail party is a party where cocktails are served.

Cocktail party may also refer to:

- Cocktail party effect, the ability to pay attention to one conversation among many
- Cocktail party problem, a signal separation application emulating the cocktail party effect
- The Cocktail Party, a play by T. S. Eliot

== See also ==
- The Longest Cocktail Party, 1973 book about the Beatles
- The World's Largest Outdoor Cocktail Party, annual American Florida–Georgia college football game
- Cocktail (disambiguation)
