= Ed Sahely =

Canadian actor, director (b. 1969)

- Born: Edward Sahely; 1969 (age 55–56); Toronto, Ontario, Canada
- Occupation(s): Actor, comedian, director
- Years active: 1983–present

Ed Sahely is a Canadian actor who is best known for his role as Possum Lake business entrepreneur Murray Woolworth on the second season of The Red Green Show.

== Career ==
Sahely spent seven years performing and writing with The Second City and received a Dora Mavor Moore Award for work on the Toronto Mainstage. Sahely was co-creator with Kathy Greenwood and Jonathan Wilson of the improv troupe Not to Be Repeated, which was later developed into the television series This Sitcom Is...Not to Be Repeated for CTV and The Comedy Channel.

== Television, film and theater credits ==
Sahely's television and film acting credits include principal roles in: Three to Tango, Monk, Sue Thomas: F.B.Eye, Getting Along Famously, The Jane Show, Instant Star, The 11th Hour, Robocop: The Series, Traders and Due South. Theater acting credits include: The Drowsy Chaperone, Annie, A Funny Thing Happened on the Way to the Forum, Outrageous, Lend Me a Tenor and Weekend Comedy. Directing credits include: Christian Republican Fundraiser In Dayton Tennessee, The Catering Queen, My Own Private Oshawa, Rum and Vodka, The Golden Mile, Joan Of Montreal and Finding Regina.

== Personal life ==
Sahely is gay, and has been teaching Group Improv for Actors to the first-year theatre students at George Brown College since 2005.

== Filmography ==
- The World's Oldest Living Bridesmaid (1990)
- Ghost Mom (1993)
- TekWar (1994)
- Canadian Bacon (1995)
- Electra (1996)
- Maximum Risk (1996)
- Rescuers: Stories of Courage: Two Women (1997)
- On the 2nd Day of Christmas (1997)
- Blues Brothers 2000 (1998)
- Let's Ruin Dad's Day (1998)
- Coming Unglued (1999)
- Rocky Marciano (1999)
- Genius (1999)
- Three to Tango (1999)
- The Hurricane (1999)
- Apartment Hunting (2000)
- Glitter (2001)
- My Own Private Oshawa (2002)
- Ham & Cheese (2004)
- Love Rules! (2004)
- Getting Along Famously (2005)
- Cool Money (2005)
