= Fight Like a Girl (book) =

2016 book by Clementine Ford

- Author: Clementine Ford
- Subject: sexism and feminist responses
- Published: 2016
- Publisher: Allen & Unwin
- ISBN: 978-1-76029-236-2
- OCLC: 1005605787

Fight Like a Girl is a book by Australian feminist writer Clementine Ford on experiences of sexism and recommendations for feminist responses, first published in 2016. The book was positively received by critics.

== Publication ==
Fight Like a Girl was first published in 2016 by Allen & Unwin.

== Synopsis ==
Fight Like a Girl presents Ford's experiences of sexism and feminism in the context of the 2010s, including childhood experiences with bullying, mental health and an eating disorder, including the role of the Internet. Topics covered include "attitudes, thought patterns, media behaviour, perceptions and realities on eating disorders, masturbation, abortion, gender stereotypes in children's movies, women against feminism, men's movements for women" and victim blaming in the context of rape.

The book provides recommendations for how those identifying as women can oppose patriarchy.

== Critical reception ==
Author Katherine Brabon described Fight Like a Girl as a rare case of a book that "sparked conversation". She saw it as bringing attention to "the insidious, the unspoken or the disguised sexism". Lisa Mantle of Sydney Mechanics' School of Arts strongly recommended the book, stating that Ford "really does pack a punch towards the trolls who try and tell her how she should behave and dress and look as a woman" and that the book is written "by someone that does not and will not put up with any crap". Leonie Hayden described the book as having many "'a-ha' moments [that are] life altering".

== See also ==
- Feminism in Australia
