= Yin Yang Yo! =

American animated television series

- Genre: Action; Science fiction; Comedy; Martial arts; Fantasy
- Created by: Bob Boyle
- Voices of: Stephanie Morgenstern; Scott McCord; Martin Roach; David Hemblen; Jamie Watson; Jonathan Wilson
- Theme music composer: Guy Moon
- Opening theme: "Main Title Theme"; by Kyle Massey
- Ending theme: "Main Title Theme" (instrumental)
- Composer: Mike Tavera
- Country of origin: United States
- No. of seasons: 2
- No. of episodes: 65 (120 segments) (list of episodes)

Production
- Executive producers: Bob Boyle; Steve Marmel (season 2)
- Producers: Tony Phillips; Bob Boyle; Bart Jennett (season 2)
- Running time: 22 minutes
- Production company: Jetix Animation Concepts (Note: Animation outsourced to Elliott Animation Inc.)

Original release
- Network: Jetix (Toon Disney)
- Release: August 26, 2006 – November 24, 2008
- Network: Disney XD
- Release: February 14 – April 18, 2009

Related
- Wow! Wow! Wubbzy!

Yin Yang Yo! is an American animated television series created by Bob Boyle for Jetix. Produced by Walt Disney Television Animation as the third Jetix original series, it first aired on August 26, 2006, as a sneak peek and premiered on September 4, 2006, in the United States. The show debuted on Jetix in the United Kingdom on February 5, 2007, after a sneak peek preview on January 27, 2007, while making its Canadian television premiere on Family Channel on March 25, 2007. The series centers on two anthropomorphic twin rabbits named Yin and Yang, and their sensei-like panda figure named Yo, a master of the fictional mystical martial art Woo Foo.

The show's staff consisted of many writers and animators associated with The Fairly OddParents, 6teen, My Life as a Teenage Robot, Invader Zim, Clone High, Wow! Wow! Wubbzy! and Danny Phantom. Head writer Steve Marmel took inspiration from various anime like FLCL and anime-influenced shows such as Teen Titans and Avatar: The Last Airbender.

== Premise ==
Yin Yang Yo! follows two 11-year-old rabbits named Yin and Yang who train under Master Yo, a grumpy old panda. They learn the sacred art of Woo Foo, a special type of martial arts that involves both might and magic. They must work together to defeat evil villains and forces motivated on destroying, corrupting or dominating society.

During the first season, the primary goal was to defeat the Night Master, a powerful enemy. During the second season, there are three primary storylines. The first one sees Yin and Yang trying to prevent other villains from being crowned the new Night Master. The second is Yang's own quest to find powerful mystic artifacts for some later-revealed-to-be villains: four evil heads who he thinks are the masters of Woo Foo. The third sees Yin and Yang against the original Night Master, Eradicus.

== Setting ==
The setting is in a town where its buildings have an Asian style. The residents are monsters, humanoids, robots and animals with human-like qualities and behaviors. The residents keep unusual pets like puppygriffs (creatures that are half puppy and half eagle) and two-ni-corns (a race of two-horned unicorns), as well as real animals like dogs, cats, opossums or armadillos. Magic and martial arts still exist since ancient times when the Night Masters were around. The episode "Yin Yang You!" reveals that the series takes place in another dimension.

== Episodes ==
Season	Segments	Episodes		Originally released		
Season	Segments	Episodes		First released	Last released	Network
1	49	26		August 26, 2006	May 14, 2007	Toon Disney (Jetix)
2	56	39	30	January 1, 2008	November 24, 2008	Toon Disney (Jetix)
2	15	39	9	February 14, 2009	April 18, 2009	Disney XD

Yin Yang Yo! premiered on Jetix on September 4, 2006, with the first season having 26 episodes. In January 2007, Jetix ordered a second season of Yin Yang Yo! with 26 episodes planned. The second season premiered on New Year's Day 2008, with 13 additional episodes.

== Characters ==
=== Main ===
The series' main characters, from left to right: Yin, Yang and Master Yo.

- Yin (voiced by Stephanie Morgenstern) is a pink rabbit and the younger twin sister of Yang. Yin is pictured as intelligent, cute, feminine and sassy. She mostly uses the Mystic side of Woo Foo, but she is also able to use the Martial Arts side of Woo Foo.
- Yang (voiced by Scott McCord) is a blue rabbit and the older twin brother of Yin. He mostly uses the Martial Arts side of Woo Foo, but is able to use the Mystic side of Woo Foo as well. Yang is a very lucky, courageous yet negligent and hasty character, and has a liking for clowns, fights, video games and often seeks attention as a hero. Despite not showing emotions towards his sister, he really cares about his sister and Yo's well-being. Yang wields a bamboo sword that he can transform into various forms using Woo Foo.
- Master Yo (voiced by Martin Roach) is a hundred-year-old panda, Yin and Yang's teacher, and among the last known Woo Foo users. He is often portrayed as arrogant, stubborn, lazy, and indifferent, yet bares great sage wisdom and is often quick with a saying from sacred scrolls. Yo is able to use both might and magic and has moves that Yin and Yang are unaware of. In the series finale, Yo is revealed to be Yin and Yang's father.

=== Villains ===
- The Night Master (voiced by David Hemblen) is an ancient sorcerer who previously eradicated all of the Woo Foo knights except for Master Yo. The Sensei managed to turn Night Master's army to stone and sent him into hiding for a hundred years until he tricked Yin and Yang into using Woo Foo in order to free his army. He is highly intelligent, though his plans typically fail because of the stupidity of his minions and his own ego. The episode "The Pecking Order" reveals the Night Master to be a title previously held by Eradicus and an unnamed cobra-like woman.
  - Grizzleflavin (voiced by Dwayne Hill, Martin Roach in "Turnabouts" and "Party Favors") is a gargoyle head located at the entrance of Night Master's lair.
  - Dank (voiced by Dwayne Hill) and Dire (voiced by Martin Roach) are the Night Master's minions.
- Carl the Evil Cockroach Wizard (voiced by Jamie Watson) is a flamboyant cockroach wizard who frequently seeks the approval of his mother. Carl is always trying to find a way to impress his mother and out-do his sadistic, selfish brother Herman. Even though Carl and Herman dislike one another, they have worked together on occasion, making a deadly force against Yin and Yang.
- Eradicus (voiced by Jonathan Wilson) is a griffin and the first Night Master. He was killed years prior under unknown circumstances. His minions posed as the ghosts of the Woo Foo Elders to manipulate Yang into collecting the items of power needed to revive him. Yang is tricked into throwing the items into the Night Master's fireplace at midnight, resurrecting Eradicus.
  - Ella Mental (voiced by Linda Ballantyne) is a minion of Eradicus who possesses telepathy.
  - Rubber Chucky (voiced by Jamie Watson) is a tall minion of Eradicus who has an elastic body.
  - Indestructo-Bob (voiced by Dwayne Hill) is a slow-witted minion of Eradicus who has indestructible armor.
  - Mollecu-Lars (voiced by Dwayne Hill) is an octopus-like minion of Eradicus who can transform his body by manipulating his molecules.
- Brother Herman (voiced by Damon Papadopoulos) is a tyrannical ant warlord and Carl's brother.
  - Charles (voiced by Jonathan Wilson) is Herman's second-in-command.
- Ultimoose (voiced by Tony Daniels) is a moose-like daredevil, martial artist, and ally of the Night Master. Ultimoose briefly becomes the new Night Master in "Deja Foo", calling himself the Night Mooster. He loses the position after Yang reverses time and retrieves the Night Master's Amnesulet before he can.
- Smoke (voiced by Linda Ballantyne) is a swordfighter who poses as Yang's girlfriend. Her appearance and mannerisms are a parody of Japanese culture.
- Mirrors (voiced by Jamie Watson) is Smoke's brother and rival. His appearance and mannerisms are a parody of Japanese culture, and he and Smoke's names are a play on the metaphor "smoke and mirrors".
- Yuck (voiced by Scott McCord) is a green rabbit formed from Yin's obsession with control and Yang's aggression. After he lost his physical form, he was found by the Night Master who built him a robotic suit to absorb Woo Foo so he could become real. He dated Yin in disguise and eventually absorbed enough energy to regain his physical form. Yuck later uses a magic charm to create an army of Yin and Yang clones and absorbs their magic, becoming as powerful as Yo.
- Zarnot (voiced by Jamie Watson) is an evil action figure brought to life by the Lie Fairy and later recruited by the Night Master.
- Pondscüm (voiced by Peter Cugno) is a Swedish tadpole who masquerades as a fish and wields a robot suit.
  - Lexoll and Velveema, collectively referred to as the Blixens, are Pondscüm's android henchmen.
- Fastidious James Spiffington (voiced by Mark Bowden) is a hamster obsessed with cleanliness and world domination. He is served by robots who he controls using his hamster ball.
- Saranoia (voiced by Linda Ballantyne) is a sorceress and mistress of disguise. She had a difficult childhood with her father and her lazy brother Mark, which led her to develop feminist views and values. Saranoia was condemned to an insane asylum from "The Truth Hurts" to "A Bad Case of the Buglies". Yin and Yang filed a restraining order on her. At this point, she has given up evil and is the spokesperson for Repulsix.
  - G.P. (voiced by David Berni) is Saranoia's gnome-like assistant. He later changes his name to Fr-Ped, an acronym for "Frighteningly Really Powerful Enraged Doombringer" (pronounced Fred).
- The Chung Pow Kitties (voiced by Stephanie Morgenstern) are a trio of cat ninjas who resemble the eponymous characters of The Powerpuff Girls. They only speak in meows, although they have been known to use translators to speak in English when in disguise.
- Kraggler (voiced by Tony Daniels) is an ancient gargoyle who used to be a great and powerful warrior and Master Yo's arch enemy until he became too old to fight. After he broke a time-manipulating hourglass, Kraggler gained the ability to drain youth.
- Roger the Skelewog (voiced by Jamie Watson) is a vicious warrior who is a part-time villain of Yin and Yang. He is the father of Roger Skelewog Jr.
- The Puffin (voiced by Jim Belushi) is a gentleman-dressed puffin, he is a parody of the DC Comics villain Penguin.
- Mastermind (voiced by Tony Daniels) is the disembodied brain of an evil wizard who seeks to regain a body. His real body was blown up by a Great Bomb that Yang built years prior.
- Badfoot (voiced by Orlando Jones) is a purple horse and enemy of Yo.
- The Manotaur (voiced by Seth MacFarlane) is a bull-like man who dresses like a city man.
- Ranger Ron (voiced by Dwayne Hill) is an illiterate, pig-like park ranger.

=== Allies ===
- Coop (voiced by Jonathan Wilson) is a nerdy chicken with a huge crush on Yin. He is initially a minion of the Night Master before reforming and joining Yin and Yang's Woo Foo Army. Coop has the ability to create a glowing energy aura dubbed "Shadow Chicken".
- Lina (voiced by Novie Edwards) is a dog who has a longtime crush on Yang. In the episode "Gone-A-Fowl", the two share their feelings for each other and enter a relationship.
- Roger Skelewog Jr. (voiced by Dwayne Hill) is the son of Yin and Yang's part-time enemy, Roger the Skelewog. He is initially a bully to Yin and Yang before befriending them.
- Dave (voiced by Jonathan Wilson) is a living tree stump. He can manipulate plants, but is weak and usually underestimated.
- The Boogeyman is a disco-loving green monster and a friend of Yin and Yang.
- Jobeaux (voiced by Bill Engvall) is a Redneckistanian Woo Foo practitioner. He has a pet armadillo named Fuzzy Thunder who hides in his mouth, giving him a hick accent.
- Melodia (voiced by Megan Fahlenbock) is the princess of the Stink Aardvarks.
- Rainbow Mane (voiced by Hadley Kay) is the leader of the Two-ni-corns.

== Cast ==
- Stephanie Morgenstern – Yin, Chung Pow Kitties
- Scott McCord – Yang, Yuck
- Martin Roach – Yo
- Jamie Watson – Carl, Zarnot, Mirrors, Rubber Chucky, Roger the Skelewog
- Tony Daniels – Kraggler, Ultimoose, Mastermind
- Dwayne Hill – Indestructo-Bob, Molecu-Lars, F. L. Smelfman
- Novie Edwards – Lina, Girlbotica
- Linda Ballantyne – Smoke, Saranoia, Ella Mental
- David Hemblen – Night Master
- Damon Papadopolous - Brother Herman
- Jonathan Wilson – Coop, Dave, Eradicus
- Megan Fahlenbock – Melodia
- Peter Cugno - Pondscüm
- Jennifer Coolidge – Coop's Mother
- Jim Belushi – Puffin
- Hadley Kay – Rainbow Mane
- Bill Engvall – Jobeaux
- Kathleen Laskey – Edna, Lie Fairy
- Seth MacFarlane – Manotaur
- Orlando Jones – Badfoot
- Nancy O'Dell – Nancy Delffa
- Mark Bowden – Fastidious James Spiffington

=== Guest stars ===
- Kyle Massey
- Jason Earles
- Mitchel Musso

== Production ==
The series was created by Bob Boyle, an animator and storyboard artist previously working on Nickelodeon projects such as The Fairly OddParents and Danny Phantom. Influenced by his frequent trips to Little Tokyo, Los Angeles, Boyle developed the pilot for the series when his then-previous series Wow! Wow! Wubbzy! was in production. Once the series got the green-light, Boyle initially worked simultaneously on development for the first season of both shows. Steve Marmel, a stand-up comedian and also a writer for The Fairly OddParents and Danny Phantom, who has known Boyle for years, was offered a long-term contract from Disney/Jetix to participate on the project upon request by Boyle, who needed assistance on producing the show due to scheduling conflicts. Marmel, who would later create Sonny with a Chance and So Random!, drew influence from anime shows such as Gainax-produced FLCL, putting American anime-influenced animated shows like Teen Titans and Samurai Jack in the mix, using it as driving force to deliver comedy. Although a show directed at general audiences, especially children over 6 years old, with its mildly risqué innuendos it also targets adults as well.

"They asked if I wanted to work on Bob's show because it was their first comedy. It was just a match. I'm working with a friend and I'm working with a genre that I love, anime. I don't think anybody's ever done a flat-out tweak on it for comedy purposes. There have been some tongue-in-cheek moments, but nobody's ever said 'We're going to play with this and make it our own," you know? Do to anime what Seinfeld did to comedy."

— Steve Marmel

John Fountain (who participated in Fairly OddParents, My Life as a Teenage Robot, Invader Zim) was brought on board as a series director for the initial first season when his work for My Life as a Teenage Robot was concluding. Fountain worked closely with Marmel and Boyle on developing the lore of the show, and occasionally assisted in storyboarding the first episode, writing and co-voice directing with Marmel. Eric Trueheart (Invader Zim) also assisted in writing scripts and co-voice directing with Marmel during the second season.

For cost efficiency due to the small budget and crew the series had, the majority of pre-production for the series—including animation, voice recording, and storyboarding—was done in Toronto. The majority of the character design direction was done by Mark Thornton and Todd Kauffman (co-creators of Grojband and Looped, and character designers for Total Drama). The animation for the show was provided by Elliott Animation, a Canadian animation studio previously working on Teletoon's 6teen. A different group of animators, who work on revisions and interstitials, come from the Disney campus of Burbank in California, United States and Frederator Studios, producer of many Nickelodeon titles. As the series is an American co-production by Disney, many actors that worked in Disney productions such as Kyle Massey, Jason Earles and Mitchel Musso guest starred as voice actors in the series.

The music for the show was provided by Michael Tavera, who also created music for Time Squad and ¡Mucha Lucha!, while the theme song was written by Bob Boyle and Guy Moon and performed by Massey. Many episodes of Yin Yang Yo! were directed by Fountain, Mark Ackland (a director of Clone High), Ted Collyer (also director of Clone High), and Chad Hicks (also director of Total Drama, and storyboard artist for Courage the Cowardly Dog). At the same time, the main established writing force was Steve Marmel (also executive producer) with the help of Trueheart, Aydrea ten Bosch (ChalkZone), Sib Ventress (Danny Phantom). Chris Romano and Eric Falconer, responsible for Spike's Blue Mountain State, and production of How I Met Your Mother and The Sarah Silverman Program, also participated on the writing of various episodes. Staff writers Evan Gore & Heather Lombard who penned Futurama's episode "Fear of a Bot Planet" (1ACV05) and The Adventures of Jimmy Neutron, Boy Genius's episodes "Krunch Time" and "Brobot", lately dedicated their work for Lilo & Stitch: The Series, participated in the creative process of Yin Yang Yo! as well. As the series went on, Bart Jennett (Recess) became a producer and writer on the series, with many other freelance writers joining like Danielle Koenig and Rob Hummel (Invader Zim), Dave Newman and Joe Liss (Drawn Together and SpongeBob SquarePants), Amy Wolfram (Teen Titans and Xiaolin Showdown), Scott Sonneborn (Beavis and Butt-Head and Undergrads), and even former creators like Phil Walsh (Teamo Supremo) and Van Partible (Johnny Bravo).

== Reception ==
=== Ratings ===
The debut of the pilot episode on Toon Disney's Jetix block was its "most-watched original animated series premiere ever". The series continued to garner high ratings on the block afterwards, tying for first place on average.

In Europe, Yin Yang Yo! was the third-most popular Jetix original series for third-party sales as of fiscal year 2007, when the first season was delivered. Yin Yang Yo! and the major Jetix Europe originals ranked "as one of the top two shows in their timeslots in all of the markets in which they aired."

=== Reviews ===
Common Sense Media had a mixed opinion of the show, giving it a score of 3/5. The pilot was poorly received by The New York Times.

== Awards ==
During 2007, this show was nominated for British Academy Children's Award by the BAFTA in the International category, but lost to Nickelodeon's SpongeBob SquarePants.

Year	Association	Category	Nominee	Result
2007	British Academy Children's Awards	International	Bob Boyle, Steve Marmel	Nominated
2007	Golden Reel Awards	Best Sound Editing in Sound Effects, Foley, Dialogue, ADR and Music for Television Animation	Episode "Return of the Night Master"; Otis Van Osten, Melinda Rediger, Trevor Sperry, Jason Oliver, Jody Thomas, Mike Tavera, Jeff Shiffman, Kate Marciniak	Nominated
