= Jonathan Wilson (actor) =

Canadian actor, comedian and playwright (born 1963)

- Born: October 19, 1963 (age 63); Oshawa, Ontario, Canada
- Occupations: Actor; comedian; playwright
- Years active: 1988–present

Jonathan Wilson (born October 19, 1963) is a Canadian actor, comedian and playwright, who is best known for his 1996 play My Own Private Oshawa. The play, a semi-autobiographical comedy about growing up gay in Oshawa, Ontario, was also optioned by Sandra Faire's SFA Productions for production as a film, which won an award at the Columbus International Film & Video Festival in 2002 until being broadcast as a television film on CTV in 2005.

== Career ==
Wilson was a member of The Second City's Toronto cast in the early 1990s. He later collaborated with fellow Second City alumni Kathy Greenwood and Ed Sahely on the stage show Not to Be Repeated, in which the three performed a two-act improvisational narrative comedy play in each performance. The show was also later developed into a short-run television series, This Sitcom Is...Not to Be Repeated, for The Comedy Network in 2001. In 1998, he appeared on the LGBT-themed sketch comedy special In Thru the Out Door for CBC Television and the United States Showtime.

In animation, Wilson's other acting credits include voice roles in Ned's Newt, Blaster's Universe, Mia and Me, Little Bear, Redwall, Harry and His Bucket Full of Dinosaurs, Totally Spies!, Skatoony, Freaky Stories, Camp Lakebottom, Yin Yang Yo!, Get Ed, BeyWheelz, Iggy Arbuckle, and Miss Spider's Sunny Patch Friends. In live-action, recurring roles in Traders, The Endless Grind, Sue Thomas: F.B.Eye and This Is Wonderland, film roles in House, Saint Ralph, New York Minute, PCU, Rubber Carpet and Brain Candy, commercials such as Rice Krispies, and stage productions of The Laramie Project, The Normal Heart and Disney's The Lion King. He won a Dora Mavor Moore Award for Outstanding Performance in a Featured Role - Play or Musical for his performance as Timon in The Lion King.

In 2022, Wilson and Daniel Krolik starred in the Toronto Fringe Festival play Gay for Pay with Blake and Clay, which was written by Krolik and Curtis Campbell. They returned to the 2023 Fringe Festival with the sequel show Blake and Clay's Gay Agenda.

In 2025, he premiered the autobiographical show A Public Display of Affection.

== Filmography ==
=== Film ===
Year	Title	Role	Notes
1993	Change of Heart	Mikey	
1994	PCU	Gay Activist	
1995	Tommy Boy	Marty	
1995	House	John	
1996	Kids in the Hall: Brain Candy	Panicky Assistant	
1997	Rubber Carpet	Ansel	
1997	The Real Blonde	Young Man	
2000	Franklin and the Green Knight	Goblin	
2003	Blizzard	Jeremey	
2004	New York Minute	Train Conductor	
2004	Saint Ralph	Father Gregg	
2004	Life by Default	Mr. Daniels	
2007	The Third Eye	Coroner	

=== Television ===
Year	Title	Role	Notes
1988	Captain Power and the Soldiers of the Future	Soldier Jack	Episode: "A Summoning of Thunder: Part 1"
1990	Top Cops	Larry Mullane	Episode: "Larry Mullane/John Benedict"
1991	Captain Power: The Beginning	Soldier Jack	Television film
1992	The Valour and the Horror	James Morrison	Episode: "Death by Moonlight: Bomber Command"
1992–1993	E.N.G.	Various roles	3 episodes
1994	Squawk Box	Various	Main cast member
1994	Side Effects	Clerk	Episode: "Worth It"
1995	Sugartime	Deliveryman	Television film
1995–1996	Little Bear	Voice	13 episodes
1996	Traders	Peter Fish	2 episodes
1997–1998	Freaky Stories	Narrator	3 episodes
1997–2000	Ned's Newt	Rusty / Various roles	Various episodes
1998	The Dumb Bunnies	Jack Junior / Tumtee	2 episodes
1999	Wind at My Back	Angus Hardy	Episode: "New Directions"
1999	Total Recall 2070	Rekall Technician	Episode: "Brightness Falls"
1999	Monster by Mistake	Tommy	Episode: "Back in Time"
1999–2000	Blaster's Universe	Max Blaster	13 episodes
1999–2000	Redwall	Various roles	27 episodes
2000	Virtual Mom	Mom	Television film
2000	Redwall: The Movie	Chickenhound / Mingo	Television film
2001	Anne of Green Gables: The Animated Series	Stuart	Episode: "Carrots"
2002	Doc	Eldon Bigley	Episode: "Love of the Game"
2002	Monk	Young Promoter	Episode: "Mr. Monk and the Red-Headed Stranger"
2002–2004	RoboRoach	Voice	7 episodes
2002–2004	Henry's World	Earl Wiggins, Ernest Wiggins	52 episodes
2002–2004	Sue Thomas: F.B.Eye	Howie Fines	8 episodes
2003	Miss Spider's Sunny Patch Kids	Ant 1	Television film
2003	The Wonderful World of Disney	Frederic the Bellhop	2 episodes
2004–2007	Atomic Betty	Infantor	9 episodes
2004–2008	Miss Spider's Sunny Patch Friends	Ned	19 episodes
2004–2010	Franny's Feet	Various roles	6 episodes
2005	Totally Spies!	Voice	3 episodes
2005	Naturally, Sadie	Mr. Tallyrand	Episode: "Off the Map"
2005	Carl²	Voice	Episode: "Carl the Magnificent"
2005–2007	Harry and His Bucket Full of Dinosaurs	Steggy / Various roles	17 episodes
2006–2009	Yin Yang Yo!	Various roles	
2007	Iggy Arbuckle	Iggy Arbuckle	26 episodes
2007–2008	Wayside	Various roles	
2007–2010	Magi-Nation	Core Hyren	2 episodes
2008–2009	World of Quest	Various roles	25 episodes
2009	Dex Hamilton: Alien Entomologist	Ned / Eric	Episode: "The Black Widow"
2009	The Good Germany	Pete	Television film
2009–2010	Pearlie	Ludwig	6 episodes
2010	Dan for Mayor	John Wilson	Episode: "The Return of Wheel-O"
2010–2013	Skatoony	Chudd Chudders	39 episodes
2010–2011	Bolts & Blip	Steve	26 episodes
2011	The Cat in the Hat Knows a Lot About That!	Buster / Spot	Episode: "Blue Feet Are Neat!/Reef Magic"
2011	She's the Mayor	Wilson	Episode: "Heart and Hope"
2011	Warehouse 13	Courtney's Producer	Episode: "Trials"
2011–2012	Mia and Me	Phuddle	26 episodes
2011, 2017	Murdoch Mysteries	Dr. Kemp / Felix Roach	2 episodes
2012	Beyblade: Shogun Steel	Baihu	Episode: "The All-Out Mid-Air Battle"
2013	Beyblade: Metal Fusion	Baihu	Episode: "The Legend and the Evil Combine"
2013–2017	Camp Lakebottom	Rosebud	16 episodes
2014	Arthur	Waldo	Episode: "The Friend Who Wasn't There/Surprise!"
2015	The Adventures of Napkin Man!	Uncle Chris	Episode: "Special Soapstone"
2019	Designated Survivor	Harlan Richter	Episode: "#identity/crisis"
2020	Tiny Pretty Things	Anthony Talmadge	Episode: "Class Act"
2021–2022	Big Blue	King PuffyPants / Hermit Crab Stockist	6 episodes
