= List of Yin Yang Yo! episodes =

This is a list of episodes of Yin Yang Yo!, an animated action/adventure television series produced by Walt Disney Television Animation. It aired for two seasons between 2006 and 2009 in the United States, on Jetix and Disney XD. There are a total of 65 episodes. It is about a pair of rabbit siblings, Yin and Yang, trained by a panda in the mystical martial art of Woo-Foo.

== Series overview ==
Season	Segments	Episodes		Originally released		
Season	Segments	Episodes		First released	Last released	Network
1	49	26		August 26, 2006	May 14, 2007	Toon Disney (Jetix)
2	56	39	30	January 1, 2008	November 24, 2008	Toon Disney (Jetix)
2	15	39	9	February 14, 2009	April 18, 2009	Disney XD

== Episodes ==
=== Season 1 (2006–07) ===
No. overall	No. in season	Title	Directed by	Written by	Storyboard by	Original release date	Prod. code
1	1	"Dojo, Oh No!"	Mark Ackland & John Fountain	Steve Marmel, Rita Hsiao, Doug Chamberlin & Chris Webb	Llyn Hunter, Rudi E. Berden and John Fountain	August 26, 2006	101
1	1	"Finding Hershel"	Ted Collyer & John Fountain	Steve Marmel, Rita Hsiao, Doug Chamberlin & Chris Webb	N/A	August 26, 2006	101
Dojo, Oh No!: Yin and Yang are in need of a new training device, so Yang joins Ultimoose fighting. Does that mean he will leave Yin? Antagonist: Ultimoose and Night Master Finding Hershel: For Woo Foo training, Yo makes Yin and Yang watch a rock named Hershel. After Yang calls Hershel stupid, Hershel turns into a scorpion and wanders off into the city. Anything Hershel stings turns into a monster, so Carl the Evil Cockroach Wizard wants Hershel to sting him. Yin and Yang must get Hershel back before Carl succeeds in getting stung. Antagonist: Carl Pre-theme song saying: Yin/It burns!
2	2	"600 Channels of Doom!"	Mark Ackland & John Fountain	Bob Boyle & Steve Marmel	Chad Hicks	September 4, 2006	102
2	2	"An Oldie But a Goodie"	Ted Collyer & John Fountain	John Fountain & Steve Marmel	Craig Valde & Llyn Hunter	September 4, 2006	102
600 Channels of Doom!: Carl, the Evil Cockroach Wizard, gives Yin and Yang a new TV with only one remote. Yin and Yang fight over the remote, giving Carl a chance to destroy them. Antagonist: Carl An Oldie But a Goodie: Yin and Yang tell Yo that he is old, and Yo makes them pick up his medication. Yo throws a party to look cool, but Yin and Yang make Yo's old enemy, Kraggler, mad. Kraggler turns everyone, except Yin and Yang, into old people. Antagonist: Kraggler Pre-theme song saying: Yang/It's dawn of the almost dead!
3	3	"Yin Yang Yuck!"	Mark Ackland & John Fountain	Chris Romano & Eric Falconer	Angelo Libutti	September 4, 2006	105
3	3	"Beetlemania"	Ted Collyer & John Fountain	The Keyes Brothers	Riccardo Durante	September 4, 2006	105
Yin Yang Yuck!: Yin and Yang wish to lose their bossiness and aggression and in the process accidentally create a new villain, Yuck. Antagonist: Yuck Beetlemania: Yang fakes being a Woo Foo Warrior to impress a girl. To prove his skills, he has to take out a huge steel beetle. Antagonist: The Huge Steel Beetle Pre-theme song saying: Yang/You're not helping, precious.
4	4	"Enter: The Ant"	Mark Ackland & John Fountain	Eric Trueheart; Story by : John Fountain & Steve Marmel	Chad Hicks	September 4, 2006	104
4	4	"Sweet Stench of Love (The Stinky Elephant)"	Ted Collyer & John Fountain	Aydrea Ten Bosch	Craig Valde	September 4, 2006	104
Enter: The Ant: Yin and Yang try to teach Yo that it's not good to boss kids around, but little do they know, Herman the Evil Ant is waiting for the panda to leave so he can conquer the world. Antagonist: Herman Sweet Stench of Love: Yin and Yang get into a fight while cleaning their room, and when Yin costs Yang the world record at a video game, he refuses to shower until one of them cracks and apologizes. But Yang is soon encouraged to clean himself up when his odor attracts the amorous advances of Malodia the Elephant, Princess of the Stink Aardvarks. Antagonist: King French, Princess Malodia Pre-theme song saying: King French/Would you consider rolling in dung?
5	5	"Woo Foo Flu"	Ted Collyer & John Fountain	Steve Marmel	Chad Hicks	September 4, 2006	106
5	5	"The Imagination Situation"	Mark Ackland & John Fountain	Steve Marmel	Craig Valde	September 4, 2006	106
Woo Foo Flu: Yin comes down with a case of the Woo Foo Flu, an illness that causes her to bend reality whenever she sneezes. Master Yo orders Yang to take care of her while Master Yo concocts an antidote for the Woo Foo Flu. However, Yin later gets captured by Carl - who intends to exploit her illness so it can help him take over the world - and Yang may have to get himself sick to save Yin. Antagonist: Carl The Imagination Situation: Yin and Yang use Zarnot to boost their popularity by lying. When Zarnot becomes huge, they must prove that they are telling the truth. Antagonist: Zarnot Pre-theme song saying: Carl/Ever seen one of these?
6	6	"Falling Yin Love"	Ted Collyer & John Fountain	Aydrea Ten Bosch	John Flagg	September 4, 2006	108
6	6	"On Golden Pondscüm"	Mark Ackland & John Fountain	Marty Isenberg & Sib Ventress	Riccardo Durante	September 4, 2006	108
Falling Yin Love: Yin falls in love with a person named Brett who actually turns out to be Yuck. Antagonist: Yuck On Golden Pondscum: Yin and Yang have to stop Pondscum from stealing Yo's golden chair. Antagonist: Pondscum Pre-theme song saying: Yang/That is not new chair smell!
7	7	"Too Much Yangformation"	Mark Ackland & John Fountain	Evan Gore & Heather Lombard; Story by : Steve Marmel	Dermot Walshe	September 4, 2006	107
7	7	"Aura Or Not"	Ted Collyer & John Fountain	Steve Marmel	John Flagg	September 4, 2006	107
Too Much Yangformation: Yang uses the Glasses of Unlimited Smartness to pass the test to get to the next level of Woo Foo training. But Carl tries to get Yang to help him grow huge. Antagonist: Carl Aura...Or Not: Yin's Woo Foo Aura gets out of control, trying to save the environment and escapes Yin's body, destroying the town. Antagonist: Yin's aura Pre-theme song saying: Roger's Wife/Get in the van, Roger! Now!
8	8	"Old School"	Mark Ackland & John Fountain	Steve Marmel, Dan Ewald & Rajeev Sigamoney; Story by : Dan Ewald & Rajeev Sigamoney	Nick Cross	September 4, 2006	109
8	8	"A Toy's Story"	Ted Collyer & John Fountain	Steve Marmel & The Keyes Brothers; Story by : The Keyes Brothers	Andrew Tan & Llyn Hunter	September 4, 2006	109
Old School: Kraggler uses the cronalogicum to trade ages with Yin and Yang so he can become young again. Antagonist: Kraggler A Toy's Story: Yang wins a doll at the county fair for Yin, but the doll is actually Zarnot. Antagonist: Zarnot and Night Master Pre-theme song saying: Yang/Stop naggin' me, woman!
9	9	"The Trouble with Two-ni-corns"	Ted Collyer & John Fountain	Mark Drop & Steve Marmel; Story by : Mark Drop	Craig Valde	September 4, 2006	110
9	9	"Scarf It Up!"	Mark Ackland & John Fountain	Chris Romano & Eric Falconer	Dermot Walshe & John Flagg	September 4, 2006	110
Trouble with Two-ni-corns: Yo tells Yin to go to the valley of the two-ni-corns and find a rainbow mane The Gnu to fix her toy. Meanwhile, Yang is taken over by Ultimoose. Antagonist: Ultimoose Scarf It Up!: Saranoia makes a snow day so that Yin and Yang can play outside and Yin may have a day off, as she holds an obsession with Yin's future. Antagonist: Saranoia Pre-theme song saying: Saranoia/ We're done with the unfairness, Mark!
10	10	"The Return of the Night Master"	Mark Ackland, Ted Collyer, John Fountain & Llyn Hunter	Steve Marmel	Chad Hicks, Andrew Tan & Llyn Hunter	October 2, 2006	111
The Return of the Night Master: Many years ago, Yo was the only Woo Foo warrior who was left during the battle against the world's greatest evil, The Night Master. Yo used Woo Foo to defeat his enemy, but because of the Amnisulet, everyone forgot that Woo Foo saved the world. Now people make light of Woo Foo warriors. The Night Master plans to free his army from the spell Yo put them under during a dodgeball tournament in the park. Yin and Yang see the tournament and ask Yo if they can join. Yo says no, adding that true martial artists don't use their skills in ways that bring up mad emotions. They enter the tournament anyway and get beaten by everyone they go up against. The Night Master appears in the shadows and offers them special training to use their Woo Foo skills with mad emotions. With Yin and Yang using mad emotions, the spell is broken for The Night Master's army. Antagonist: Night Master and Ultimoose Pre-theme song saying: Yang/Ow! The pretzel!
11	11	"My Stupid Sword"	Mark Ackland & John Fountain	Steve Marmel	Riccardo Durante	October 9, 2006	103
11	11	"Neat Freak"	Ted Collyer & John Fountain	Mark Drop	Andrew Tan	October 9, 2006	103
My Stupid Sword: Yang is thrilled that the CPK (Chung Pow Kitties; a pastiche of Hello Kitty and Powerpuff Girls), a rock band made of cats with mad ninja skills in town. Not only that, but they also appear on Broadway and are looking for a new member. Having a sharp sword is a requirement. Yang's bamboo sword isn't sharp enough, but Master Yo refuses to give Yang a new sword. Yang plots to steal weapons from the Forbidden Armory to try to make the cut. Antagonist: Chung Pow Kitties Neat Freak: Yin meets a hamster who loves to clean while she is out buying cleaning supplies. The hamster reveals himself to be Fastidious, and asks the Woo Foo students to help him defeat some of the spirits who have been making a mess. However, there is something sinister about Fastidious. Antagonist: Fastidious Pre-theme song saying: Yin/Who wants to have fun with toilets?
12	12	"The High She-as"	Mark Ackland & John Fountain	Eric Trueheart & Steve Marmel	Daniel Lafrance	October 16, 2006	112
12	12	"A Match Not Made in Heaven"	Ted Collyer & John Fountain	Sib Ventress	Dermot Walshe & John Flagg	October 16, 2006	112
The High She-as: Yin and Yang are fishing when a group of female pirates appear. They act really nice towards Yin, but not so much towards Yang. Are these pirates all they appear to be, or is there something else about them? Antagonist: Saranoia and Ultimoose A Match Not Made In Heaven: Carl wants to use his mother's destructive jewelry for his nefarious purposes (especially since she never wears them) but his mother, Edna, won't let him. Meanwhile, Yang pulls a practical joke on Master Yo by posting his bio on a website for dating service for old people. Master Yo's blind date turns out to be Edna. Can Yin and Yang break up this relationship that's not meant to be before Carl can take advantage of his mother's absence? Antagonist: Carl Pre-theme song saying: Yin/Hey, there's my mint!
13	13	"Scary Scary Quite Contrary"	Mark Ackland & John Fountain	Eric Trueheart & Steve Marmel; Story by : Steve Marmel	Craig Valde	October 23, 2006	113
13	13	"How the Cookie Crumbles"	Ted Collyer & John Fountain	Sib Ventress & Steve Marmel	Chad Hicks	October 23, 2006	113
Scary Scary Quite Contrary: Master Yo shows Yin and Yang that black-and-white films can be scary. Antagonist: The Monsters How the Cookie Crumbles: Yin uses the misfortune cookies on Yang to take away his good luck. Antagonist: Carl Pre-theme song saying: Yang/That thing makes me barf!
14	14	"The Yin of Yang"	Ted Collyer & John Fountain	Aydrea Ten Bosch & Steve Marmel; Story by : Aydrea Ten Bosch	Andrew Tan	October 30, 2006	114
14	14	"Shopping Sprawl"	Mark Ackland & John Fountain	The Keyes Brothers & Sib Ventress; Story by : Eric Trueheart	Daniel Lafrance	October 30, 2006	114
The Yin of Yang: Yang is really interested in a girl named Lina, who is Yin's really good friend. The trouble is, Yang's behavior turns Lina off. So Master Yo suggests that Yang should try to be more like Yin in order to make Lina like him. Antagonist: Fastidious and his Ninjas Shopping Sprawl: Yin and Yang are fed up with not getting an allowance from Master Yo for doing chores around the dojo. Then a stranger appears, announcing the opening of a new UltraMega Mall in their town and giving the two young warriors credit cards to their heart's content. Are Yin and Yang playing directly into an evil villain's plans? Antagonist: Night Master, Ultimoose and his goons Pre-theme song saying: Ultimoose's Goon/What size would you like your doom?
15	15	"Wubble in Paradise"	Ted Collyer & John Fountain	Eric Trueheart	John Flagg	November 13, 2006	115
15	15	"Dictator of the Year"	Mark Ackland & John Fountain	The Keyes Brothers	Dermot Walshe	November 13, 2006	115
Wubble in Paradise: The Night Master discovers an embarrassing secret about Yang. When Yang was 4, he wrote a book about an imaginary land with imaginary creatures, and the book naturally has Yang as the hero. The Night Master invades Yang's childhood world in an attempt to destroy Yin and Yang for good. Antagonist: Night Master Dictator of the Year: Yin and Yang have learned enough Woo Foo to be allowed into the Vault of Forbidden Objects. Herman's army of ants seize this opportunity to steal the Book of Evil. In order to prevent Herman from opening the book and releasing its evil, Yin and Yang must sneak into Herman's house and retrieve the book. Antagonist: Herman Pre-theme song saying: Charles/ I like long walks on the beach--/ Yang (interrupting)/ Shut up!
16	16	"Master Dave"	Ted Collyer & John Fountain	Eric Trueheart	Craig Valde	November 20, 2006	116
16	16	"Destination Danger"	Mark Ackland & John Fountain	Eric Trueheart & Steve Marmel	John Flagg & Andrew Tan	November 20, 2006	116
Master Dave: The Tree Stump Kid named Dave is disappointed because his friends Yin and Yang missed his birthday party. To make up for it, Yin and Yang promise to do anything to make it up to Dave. When Dave learns he has a "Day After His Birthday Party" coming up, he convinces Yin and Yang to pretend to be his students. But Master Yo warns Yin and Yang no good can come out of lying. Antagonist: Carl and two firespirits elementals Destination Danger: Years ago, Master Yo gave a powerful weapon, the Knuckles of Infinite Smackdown, to a friend for safekeeping. But now that The Night Master is after it, Master Yo must take Yin and Yang on a road trip to try to throw The Night Master's lackeys off Master Yo's trail. Antagonist: Night Master, Dank & Dire Pre-theme song saying: Yang/That's what makes it creepy.
17	17	"Bad Nanny Jamma"	Mark Ackland & John Fountain	Aydrea Ten Bosch	Tavis Silbernagel	November 27, 2006	117
17	17	"Pros and Cons"	Ted Collyer & John Fountain	Steve Marmel, Eric Trueheart & Sib Ventress	Angelo Libutti	November 27, 2006	117
Bad Nanny Jamma: Saranoia wants to destroy Yang. She goes to Master Yo's dojo to try to destroy Yang there. To get in, Saranoia uses a broom wand to transform her into a maid. But the wand has a mind of its own and won't let Saranoia destroy Yang until the Dojo is spotless! Antagonist: Saranoia Pros and Cons: Carl thinks the one thing that keeps him from being a great villain is that he has no henchmen. When he hears The Night Master is holding an Evil Convention in town and every villain is invited, Carl goes there hoping to find a henchman. Meanwhile, Yin and Yang go to the convention in disguise, hoping to find out about The Night Master's master plan. Antagonist: Night Master Pre-theme song saying: Carl/I will never be able to trust a donkey again!
18	18	"The Gig is Up"	Mark Ackland & John Fountain	Sib Ventress & The Keyes Brothers	Craig Valde	December 11, 2006	118
18	18	"Doomed to Repeat It"	Ted Collyer & John Fountain	Sib Ventress	Jeff Agala	December 11, 2006	118
The Gig is Up: When Master Yo was younger, he was in a rock band called Pandangerous. The band impressed their audience with the help of a magical amp's help. But the amp's was stolen by the Chung Pow Kitties to brainwash their audience to do their bidding. Yin and Yang must now form their own band in order to get on stage and stop the Kitties. Antagonist: Chung Pow Kitties Doomed to Repeat It: Yin and Yang are bickering on how best to defeat Carl during his latest attack on the city. Since Yin and Yang refuse to listen to Master Yo about working together, Master Yo decides the only way they're going to learn how to work together is if they're forced to live through history and see the mistakes previous Woo Foo Warriors have made. Antagonist: Carl Pre-theme song saying: Yin/Yay. A three-foot tongue.
19	19	"Family Day"	Ted Collyer & John Fountain	Chris Romano, Eric Falconer & Steve Marmel	John Flagg	December 18, 2006	119
19	19	"The Hex of the Ex"	Mark Ackland & John Fountain	Jennifer Muro; Story by : Aydrea Ten Bosch	Daniel Lafrance	December 18, 2006	119
Family Day: It's a holiday known as Family Day, where family members give each other gifts. When Carl and Herman's mom wants blue and pink rabbit's limbs more than any other gift in the world, Carl and Herman both want to give their mom the gift. But when working solo doesn't work, the brothers make a one-hour truce to work together to trap and take the limbs off Yin & Yang! Antagonist: Carl and Herman The Hex of the Ex: Someone has a grudge against Master Yo and kidnap him. Yin and Yang suspect Zarnot and then Saranoia, but neither of them has done anything to the panda. Nobody else Yin and Yang knows is capable of pulling this kidnapping off. Antagonist: 3 Ex-Girlfriends of Yo Pre-theme song saying: Yang/Chicken's got some air!
20	20	"Out on a Pledge"	Ted Collyer & John Fountain	Sib Ventress	Tavis Silbernagel	February 5, 2007	120
20	20	"Dojo Alone"	Mark Ackland & John Fountain	Chris Romano & Eric Falconer	Kervin Faria	February 5, 2007	120
Out On a Pledge: Yang is sick of being surrounded by Yin's girl stuff and wants to hang out with some real guys. Unfortunately there seem to be no real guys for Yang to hang out with. Then a strange trio of teenage guys move into an abandoned house across the street from the dojo. Yang finally thinks he has the perfect place to hang out, but beneath things aren't what they appear to be. Antagonist: Chung Pow Kitties Dojo Alone: When Master Yo leaves on a vacation for some alone time, he leaves Yin and Yang unsupervised. The two rabbits think this is going to be a great experience for them, until Carl and Herman try to destroy Master Yo's Dojo. Antagonist: Carl and Herman Note: Dojo Alone is a parody of the 1990 family comedy film Home Alone. Pre-theme song saying: Yang/Nice jammies, lady!
21	21	"Attack of the Lesson"	Mark Ackland & John Fountain	Steve Marmel & Eric Trueheart	Chad Hicks	February 9, 2007	121
21	21	"A Case of the Evils"	Ted Collyer & John Fountain	The Keyes Brothers & Sib Ventress	Daniel Lafrance	February 9, 2007	121
Attack of the Lesson: Two evil spirits, who make people lazy and over eat, are released from their jars. But everybody is already lazy and eat too much, so the spirits have no work. A super-hero named The Lesson comes from beyond to make the city right again, but nobody is forcing the citizens into their bad habits. The Lesson decides to force the citizens to learn a lesson even if it hurts them. Antagonist: The Lesson A Case of Evils: After Master Yo accidentally swallows some of Carl's backwash after accidentally drinking after him. This causes Yo to slowly become evil. Yin and Yang rush to try to save their master. Antagonist: Master Yo Pre-theme song saying: Yang/Full, self, wedgie!
22	22	"Attack of the Vidiots"	Mark Ackland & John Fountain	Steve Marmel & Eric Trueheart	John Flagg	February 19, 2007	122
22	22	"Fit to be Tried"	Ted Collyer & John Fountain	Sib Ventress & Steve Marmel	Daniel Lafrance	February 19, 2007	122
Attack of the Vidiots: While Yin is busy following Master Yo's lessons, Yang is goofing off playing video games! Master Yo believes the only way Yang can learn why video game playing is only good in moderation is if he learns it for himself. This brings The Lesson back, and he is determined that Yang find out the hard way how bad too much video game playing is. Antagonist: The Lesson Fit to be Tried: Carl decides that in order to beat the Woo Foo Warriors, he needs to frame Yin and Yang for abusing their Woo Foo powers. Now Yin and Yang are on trial, and the jury is stacked with evil beings. Antagonist: Carl, Fastidious, Saranoia, Ultimoose and Herman's ants Pre-theme song saying: Yang/Spank me silly and call me floopsy!
23	23	"Voyage to the Center of the Yo"	Ted Collyer & John Fountain	Eric Trueheart & The Keyes Brothers	Jeff Agala	March 5, 2007	123
23	23	"Sitting Shaggler"	Mark Ackland & John Fountain	Steve Marmel & The Keyes Brothers; Story by : The Keyes Brothers	Craig Valde	March 5, 2007	123
Voyage to the Center of the Yo: The Safety Deposit Box Dimension opens only once every 100 years. It's opening today. Yo needs the Toilet Brush of Illumination to fight The Night Master. The Night Master shrinks Yuck and puts him into Yo's body, so he can wait until Yo grabs the brush before emerging to claim it. Yin and Yang see Yuck enter Yo's body and have to stop him by shrinking themselves and entering into Yo's body to stop Yuck. Antagonist: Yuck Sitting Shaggler: To raise money for a new security system, Yin and Yang open up a babysitting service. The Kraggler cons them into babysiting his nephew, the Shaggler. What neither of them know is Kraggler knows Yo's security system is down. The Kraggler makes himself so young he turns into a baby, allowing Shaggler to get a weapon of Master Yo's, the Adult Diaper of Doom. Antagonist: Kraggler Pre-theme song saying: Yang/Are you sure you said 'doom'? Cuz 'dude' is a lot funnier.
24	24	"Shadows and Light"	Ted Collyer & John Fountain	Sib Ventress, Eric Trueheart & Steve Marmel	Jeff Agala	April 2, 2007	124
24	24	"The Truth Hurts"	Mark Ackland & John Fountain	Aydrea Ten Bosch & Steve Marmel	Tavis Silbernagel	April 2, 2007	124
Shadows and Light: Herman's Ant Brotherhood trims all of Master Yo's fur off so Herman can steal the Geo-Demosoic Device. Yin, Yang and Yo put up a good fight, but Herman hits the students with a hammer and grabs the device before Yo's fur grows back. Antagonist: Herman and his ants The Truth Hurts: Yin and Lina want to be friends with a popular girl named Miranda. Miranda doesn't like Lina, though. Miranda is actually Saranoia who used a magic wand to turn herself in to a popular girl. Yin has to lie to Yang so she has a chance to be popular, but the Lie Fairy appears and Yang has to keep the Lie Fary busy. Yang finds out that Miranda is really Saranoia, and he tries to use the Toilet Brush of Illumination to stop her. Antagonist: Saranoia Pre-theme song saying: Roger Jr./You guys are dorks!
25	25	"Who Knows What Evil Lurks?"	Ted Collyer, Mark Ackland & John Fountain	Steve Marmel, Eric Trueheart, Sib Ventress & Aydrea Ten Bosch	Andrew Tan	April 9, 2007	125
Who Knows What Evil Lurks?: The Night Master wants Coop to spy on the students to know what they are thinking. But when The Night Master hears what Yang thinks of him, he grows angry and shoots a beam out of the phone to hit Yang. Now the students know The Night Master has a spy. Yin and Yang use the Chronologicum to travel through the time stream to see if they can figure out who the spy is. However, the Chronologicum gets damaged, and Yin and Yang are separated in two different times. Antagonist: Zarnot and Night Master Pre-theme song saying: Yang/Something, something, something... fart!
26	26	"Night Fall"	Mark Ackland, Ted Collyer & John Fountain	Steve Marmel, Eric Trueheart & Sib Ventress	Chad Hicks & Craig Valde	April 30, 2007	126
Night Fall: Coop captured Master Yo for The Night Master. Yin and Yang seek help from Roger Jr. and Carl. But when it seems Carl can't be trusted, Coop offers to help the heroes search for the broken Toilet Brush of Illumination so the students can defeat The Night Master. Antagonist: Night Master Pre-theme song saying: Carl/Don't you people know I'm a complete lunatic?

=== Season 2 (2008–09) ===
No. overall	No. in season	Title	Directed by	Written by	Storyboard by	Original release date	Prod. code
27	1	"Deja Foo"	Mark Ackland	Sib Ventress	Chad Hicks	March 10, 2008	210
Deja Foo: Ultimoose is tired of every other villain treating him like garbage. During a picnic scavenger hunt (which he wasn't invited to) he forges a plan to find the old Night Master's Amnesulet to make Grizzleflayvin forget the old Night Master. The Ultimoose will gain all of the Night Master's powers. Meanwhile, Yang wakes up and has a lousy day. Although Master Yo tells him it's not wise to walk around grumpy, Yang is too angry to listen. Yang is surprised when four floating spirit heads claiming to be ancient Woo Foo Masters tell Yang he needs to find the Amnesulet before Ultimoose does. But Yang doesn't listen to them, and Ultimoose finds the Amnesulet, gaining all the powers of The Night Master. Yang finds himself outmatched and can't beat Ultimoose's new powers. Then he discovers the Amnesulet has a reset button. Yang pushes it, and the whole day begins again. Knowing how the original events of the day play out, Yang makes the best of a bad day and gets revenge on everybody. Antagonist: Ultimoose/The Night Mooster Pre-theme song saying: Ultimoose/Chimichanga! Wrapped in foil.
28	2	"The Pecking Order"	Mark Ackland	Sib Ventress	Troy Quane	January 1, 2008	202
28	2	"Party Favors"	Ted Collyer	Eric Trueheart & Steve Marmel	Steve Remen	January 1, 2008	202
The Pecking Order: Yin and Yang prepare to go on vacation. Coop returns and tried to warn them of The Night Master's energy escaping, but they ignore him until it's too late. Antagonist: Night Master's Energy Form Party Favors: Coop's mom is throwing a "welcome back/thanks for saving the world all by yourself" party, and Yin and Yang are the only ones not invited. Meanwhile, three flunkies join together and try to get into The Night Master's fortress. However, they need the spare key, which the Night Master gave to Coop! Antagonist: Fr-Pred, Flayviour, Charles Pre-theme song saying: Yang/I don't even know a Timmy.
29	3	"Smoke and Mirrors"	Mark Ackland	Eric Trueheart & Steve Marmel	Chad Hicks	January 21, 2008	201
29	3	"Yin-credible!"	Ted Collyer	Aydrea Ten Bosch & Steve Marmel	Jeff Barker	January 21, 2008	201
Smoke and Mirrors: A new girl named Smoke comes into town claiming to want to be Yang's girlfriend. At first it's great. She likes all the stuff Yang likes. But Yang didn't count on her capturing him to be her slave champion in a tournament fighting game. Now Smoke's brother, Mirrors, picks Yin to be his own rabbit champion in the tournament, forcing Yin and Yang to go up against each other. Antagonist: Smoke and Mirrors Yin-credible: Carl captures the town's President, and even though Yin and Yang work together to stop Carl's plot, Yin is offered and takes all the credit for doing the job by herself. Naturally, Yang feels jaded but he has bigger things to worry about. Carl has decided to fight back, and with the power of earphones, he won't be able to hear the insults that usually throw him off. Yin has to decide whether to try to save the day by herself or swallow her pride and apologize to Yang. Antagonist: Carl Pre-theme song saying: Yang/My girlfriend gave it to me! Note: "Smoke and Mirrors" is a parody of martial arts anime shows in general and also Pokémon, the prizma prisions being the Pokéballs. Alex Kirwan of My Life as a Teenage Robot fame designed both characters.
30	4	"Brain Drain"	Ted Collyer	Eric Trueheart	Steve Remen	January 28, 2008	204
30	4	"The Big Payback"	Mark Ackland	Sib Ventress	Troy Quane	January 28, 2008	204
Brain Drain: Master Yo wants Yang to start using his brain to fight bad guys, but Yang isn't interested. An old floating skull villain named Mastermind, sees a way for him to use Yang's non-interest of using brain power to his advantage. Mastermind tricks Yang into giving up his brain, and Mastermind's brain now takes over Yang's body! With Mastermind controlling Yang, he can fulfill his plans for world domination. Yang will have to figure out a way to use only his brain in order to get back to the Dojo and get his body back before sundown. Antagonist: Mastermind The Big Payback: As strong as Master Yo is, there's a villain even he can't beat. Once a year, a purple anthropomorphic clothed horse with black hair named Badfoot with a voice and personality reminiscent of a funk singer, comes into town to steal Master Yo's Woo Foo. And no matter what Master Yo tries, he has been unable to beat him. Even worse, if Master Yo doesn't fight, the villain threatens to bring harm to innocent civilians. Yin and Yang are determined to help Master Yo this time around and prove to him that every villain has a weakness and can be beat! Antagonist: Badfoot Special Guest Star: Orlando Jones as Badfoot. Pre-theme song saying: Yang/Ooh, sweet!
31	5	"Imperfect Fooplicates"	Mark Ackland	Bob Keyes, Chip Keyes, Doug Keyes & Steve Marmel	Chad Hicks	February 4, 2008	205
31	5	"Messy Relationships"	Ted Collyer	Aydrea Ten Bosch & Bart Jennett	Jeff Barker	February 4, 2008	205
Imperfect Fooplicates: Yin and Yang uses a magical bracelet to make fooplicates of themselves until Yuck returns. Antagonist: Yuck Messy Relationships: Melodia the Aardvark Princess returns to claim Yang until Fastidous makes Yin mad with the Stink Aardvarks. Antagonist: Fastidious Pre-theme song saying: Melodia/My fuzzy love bucket!
32	6	"A Bad Case of the Buglies"	Mark Ackland	Larry Todd Johnson	Warren Leonhardt	February 11, 2008	206
32	6	"Control Issues"	Ted Collyer	Bart Jennett	Nick Cross	February 11, 2008	206
A Bad Case of the Buglies: Yin has finally thought of a good insult for Carl: He's bugly (because he's a bug and he's ugly). But Carl isn't going to take this insult lying down. he shells out $29.99 for a repulsifier potion from Saranoia and tricks Yin and Yang into drinking it. Now Yin and Yang both look bugly (because they're bunnies and they're ugly). Yang doesn't care about how he looks fighting evil, but Yin does and she takes it really hard. Antagonist: Carl and Ice Monster Control Issues: Master Yo wants Yang to learn self-control, but because Yang won't learn it from him, Master Yo takes Yang to learn from Ultimoose, who claims to have turned over a new leaf. While Yang is being forced to fight a giant monster until he learns self-control, Yin has to figure out why her friends are acting so weird and stealing stuff. It turns out Ultimoose isn't trying to teach self-control, he's trying to use mind-control on Yang and his friends with the use of a magic hat. Antagonist: Ultimoose, Master Yo, Roger Jr, Lina and Dave Pre-theme song saying: Yang/I might have been poking something.
33	7	"Foreign Exchange Problem"	Mark Ackland	Aydrea Ten Bosch & Steve Marmel	Troy Quane	February 18, 2008	207
33	7	"Turn About"	Ted Collyer	Bart Jennett	Troy Quane	February 18, 2008	207
Foreign Exchange Problem: Yin and Yang get a lesson in cultural enrichment when a foreign exchange student from Redneckistan named Jobeaux shows up. Meanwhile, the Chung Pow Kitties return in search of a powerful Woo Foo artifact. Yin and Yang suspect that there is more to Jobeaux than meets the eye. Antagonist: Chung Pow Kitties Turnabout: Master Yo is sick of Yin and Yang disrespecting him. Yin and Yang are sick of Master Yo treating them like babies. When young Kraggler switches ages with Yo (part of a diabolical plan), Yin and Yang are forced to babysit the three-year-old Yo, and he reveals how powerful (and bratty) he was as a child. Antagonist: Kraggler Pre-theme song saying: Yang (speaking Redneckistan) /Dag gone them rusty (pronounced rasty) shackles!
34	8	"The Manotaur"	Mark Ackland	Aydrea Ten Bosch & Bart Jennett	Troy Quane	February 25, 2008	208
34	8	"League of Evil"	Ted Collyer	Eric Trueheart & Steve Marmel	Jeff Barker	February 25, 2008	208
The Manotaur: A half-human, half-bull monster called The Manotaur has captured the two-ni-corns so he can shave them and make a wig from their fur. But The Manotaur's scheme is deeper than that. It also involves ripping off the designs of a villain in Yang's favorite comic book. Yin and Yang use that knowledge to battle The Manotaur. Antagonist: Manotaur Special Guest Star: Seth MacFarlane as The Manotaur. League of Evil: Yin and Yang decide that they want their own headquarters, and Carl decides that he's tired of living with his mom. So Yin and Yang get a place in Master Yo's Outhouse while Carl tries to find an apartment to rent. Yin and Yang's problem is that the Outhouse isn't big enough, and Carl's problem is that three other villains are also laying claim to the place that Carl wants. Carl decides the four villains should share the apartment and become a League of Evil. Yin and Yang must find a way to defeat Carl, Smoke, Mr. Pondscum, and a new villain called The Puffin. Antagonist: Carl, Smoke, Pondscüm, and The Puffin Pre-Theme song saying:Carl/ Who ate my peanut butter?!
35	9	"This Yang Isn't Brought to You By..."	Mark Ackland	Aydrea Ten Bosch	Troy Quane	March 3, 2008	209
35	9	"Stuck"	Ted Collyer	Larry Todd Johnson	Nick Cross	March 3, 2008	209
This Yang Isn't Brought to You By...: Yang wants to buy a new Y Cube 9000 portable gaming system. But when a mysterious sponsor named Shillshore sees him fight, he wants him to be a spokesperson for GreedCo toys. Yang sells his dignity, unaware that the toys he's endorsing are posing serious harm to children. Yin tries to bring Yang to his senses before anyone gets hurt. Antagonist: Shillshore and the GreedCo President Stuck: Yin, Yang, Lina, and Roger Jr. are bored out of their minds until a mysterious mail carrier (Smoke, in disguise) gives them a coupon for a free vacation to an island. Even though they all figure that it's probably a trap, they go anyway since it will be more exciting than what they have been doing. Dave insists that he comes along. But when they get to the island, not only does it turn out to be a trap, it turns out to be a much better trap then they expected it to be, and everyone except Dave ends up getting captured by Smoke. Now it's up to Dave to find a way to defeat Smoke and her three evil hench-creatures. Antagonist: Smoke and her new Forever Friends. Notes: Stuck is a parody of Lost. Pre-theme song saying: Yang/What is this "read" you speak of?
36	10	"Gone-A-Fowl"	Ted Collyer	Eric Trueheart	Jeff Barker & Nick Cross	April 7, 2008	211
Back when Yang was still a jerk, Yang promised Coop that if he did him some favors, he would get Yin to go on a date with Coop. When Coop comes to go on the date, Yin makes it clear that she won't go on the date until Coop starts acting evil again. Master Yo discovers Coop's aura is split into half-good and half-bad, and the bad aura needs to be taken away. The only way to do that is with a magical set of suspenders and a bow-tie. Master Yo goes on a quest to retrieve the magical items and instructs Yin to go on the date to make sure Coop doesn't become evil. Yang goes on the date, too to antagonize his sister, making her mad. When she gets mad, it makes Coop mad, and he turns evil. His evil spreads to Yin, making her want to be with the evil Coop even more. Yin is uneasy with hurting people and tries to stop hanging out with Coop, but he makes her even more evil, and they go on a rampage. Yang tries to prevent Yin and Coop from getting into The Night Master's lair until Master Yo can return with the magical items. Yang has to battle with three incarnations of evil Yin. Antagonist: Dark Coop and Dark Yin Special Guest Star: Nancy O'Dell as Nancy O'Delffa. Note: This is the first episode to use the wrecked music, the same badly damaged music reappeared on Yin Yang Yo! 2, "Touchy Feelings" and "Smorks". Pre-theme song saying: Yang/So you squeeze it and it goes (fart sound effect)?
37	11	"Basic Yin-stinct"	Mark Ackland	Sib Ventress	Riccardo Durante	April 14, 2008	212
37	11	"Fighting Fooberty"	Ted Collyer	Aydrea Ten Bosch	Warren Leonhardt	April 14, 2008	212
Basic Yin-stinct: Yin's Woo Foo instincts are always spot-on; Yang's decisions are always wrong. Carl manages to hex Yin by tricking her into eating Watermelon Seeds of Doubt. With Yin always second-guessing herself and unable to make decisions, Carl's evil plans have a chance to succeed. This episode is a parody of the TV series 24, following a countdown clock to zero, when Master Yo finishes going to the bathroom. Antagonist: Carl Fighting Fooberty: When Yin and Yang's Woo Foo powers start acting up and their bodies start changing, Yo realizes he has to give them "the talk." Meanwhile, Pondscüm is going through some changes too. It turns out that he's not a goldfish. He's a pollywog. When the Blixens decide they don't want to hang with him, he tries to steal enough money to get a trans-species plastic surgery. Antagonist: Pondscüm Pre-theme song saying: Pondscüm/Monkey for your cash?
38	12	"Yin Yang Carl"	Ted Collyer	Danielle Koenig & Bart Jennett	Warren Leonhardt	April 20, 2008	215
38	12	"Smorks"	Mark Ackland	Chad Hicks	Chad Hicks	April 20, 2008	215
Yin Yang Carl: Carl discovers that Yin and Yang have forgotten Master Yo's birthday. So Carl tricks them into accepting a dangerous gift to give to Master Yo, so Yin and Yang won't be thought of as being thoughtless. But the gift is really a candle that once lit and blown out, switches the brains of Master Yo and Carl. Now Master Yo is in Carl's body, and Carl is in Master Yo's body. Carl plans to order the Woo Foo Warriors to their doom, while Master Yo finds out just what Carl has to deal with at his home. Antagonist: Carl and Herman Smorks: Master Yo has to go to a responsible parenting meeting and leave Yin and Yang at the dojo. He warns Yin to not take in any pets. But when Yin sees a bunch of seemingly harmless green creatures called the Smorks, she decides to take them in and protect them from Yang. But Yang thinks that the Smorks are harboring a dark secret and actually aren't that innocent. Antagonist: The Smorks. Notes: This episode is a parody of The Smurfs and this is the second episode to use the wrecked music, the same badly damaged music reappeared on Yin Yang Yo! 2, "Touchy Feelings" and "Gone-A-Fowl". Pre-theme song saying: Smork/How's it smorkin', snuggle buddy?
39	13	"Wonder Tweens Go!"	Mark Ackland	Steve Marmel & Sib Ventress	Chad Hicks	April 28, 2008	213
39	13	"Touchy Feelings"	Ted Collyer	Aydrea Ten Bosch & Steve Marmel	Troy Quane	April 28, 2008	213
Wonder Tweens Go!: The one show Yin, Yang, Lina, and Melodia love more than anything in the world is "Super Tweenage Team Teens Go." They never miss an episode. However, their dedication to the show interferes with their responsibilities, and this brings back The Lesson! This time, he shows the four characters (and Dave, just for the heck of it) why they should be more focused on being heroes in real life than trying to be superheroes on a TV show. The Lesson uses Zarnot in his plan to teach them a lesson, which leads to unintended trouble. Antagonist: Zarnot and The Lesson. Notes: This episode is a parody of Teen Titans and this is the third episode to use the wrecked music, the same badly damaged music reappeared on Yin Yang Yo! 2, "Smorks" and "Gone-A-Fowl". Touchy Feelings: Fred is conflicted because he is unsure if he should be a good guy or a bad guy. But when he runs into Yin and Yang at the mall, he gets mad and zaps both Yang and Master Yo. Master Yo's body begins to fall apart, and Yang loses his emotions. At first, Yin thinks an emotionless Yang is going to be awesome, but she soon realizes Yang is useless in a battle without all of his feelings. Antagonist: Fr-Ped Pre-theme song saying: Yo/All bone! Jiggly, jiggly bone!
40	14	"O'Brother There Art Thou"	Mark Ackland	Dave Lewman, Joe Liss & Bart Jennett	Jeff Barker	May 5, 2008	214
40	14	"Roger... Over and Out"	Ted Collyer	Sib Ventress	Nick Cross	May 5, 2008	214
O'Brother There Art Thou: When Yang separates himself from Yin and Master Yo, he saves a robot, and they start to act like brothers. But Yin is feeling suspicious and jealous and discovers the robot is actually a spy made by Zarnot sent to destroy Yang. Antagonist: Zarnot and the Robot Child Roger...Over and Out: When Yang constantly insults and embarrasses Roger Skelewog and his father in front of everyone, he and Roger go on a Reality Show. On the show, an all-out brawl erupts between Roger Skelewog Sr. and Yang. Antagonist: Roger Skelewog Sr. Notes: The show is a parody of The Jerry Springer Show and Maury. Pre-theme song saying: Roger/I love the smell of soap suds in the morning!
41	15	"Inconvenient Tooth"	Mark Ackland	Sib Ventress	Nick Cross	June 16, 2008	216
41	15	"Situation Tragedy"	Ted Collyer	Steve Marmel & Eric Trueheart	Troy Quane	June 16, 2008	216
Inconvenient Tooth: Yang has a bad toothache, but he won't admit it because he believes the dentist is evil. However, Master Yo discovers it and tells Yang that if he doesn't fix his teeth, that he will catch Bad Hair Tooth. Yang thinks that nothing could be worse than the dentist and runs away. He catches Bad Hair Tooth, and he turns into what looks like Bugs Bunny and acts like him, too, only with different phrases (such as "What's up, Dork?"). Meanwhile, Carl is asked by his mother to hunt a non Woo Foo rabbit for dinner to earn her respect, and he begins to look like Elmer Fudd and acts like him, too. Carl then begins hunting Yang, though he doesn't realize who it is. This episode parodies many Looney Tunes characters, such as Bugs Bunny and Roadrunner. Antagonist: Carl Situation Tragedy: Carl discovers two of Yin and Yang's biggest weaknesses. Popularity distracts them, and if they are losing a battle, they run to the Dojo. So he gets his magic remote fixed from 600 Channels Of Doom, and puts them on a sitcom in front of a live studio audience. Carl also creates an episode where he buys the dojo if they can't pay off the debt. Before they know it, Yin and Yang are in a battle for the dojo that they can't even pay attention to. The sitcom show in this episode is a parody of The Suite Life of Zack & Cody. Antagonist: Carl Pre-theme song saying: Yang/This is why I don't wear pants.
42	16	"Skirting the Issue"	Mark Ackland	Rich Fogel	Jeff Barker	June 23, 2008	218
42	16	"Moon Over my Yinnie"	Ted Collyer	Aydrea Ten Bosch	Chad Hicks	June 23, 2008	218
Skirting the Issue: After Roger Jr. insults Yang's manliness (After being left in the middle of a street wearing the "Foodle-Skirt of Ultimate Protection"), they have a competition to see who's manlier. Ultimoose drains their manliness during the contest to power a missile aimed toward Tallville, and he kidnaps Yin and ties her to the missile! Antagonist: Ultimoose and his goons Moon Over my Yinnie: Carl flies into space to destroy the sun, and Yin and Yang go after him in their Woo-Foo Battle-Cruiser. Yin has reprogrammed the cruiser to act like a boyfriend, and Carl uses his "Mother-Ship" to plant Sun-Destruction Plasma Weapons. But when the cruiser gets too possessive of Yin and dumps Yang into space, Yin has to save Yang and the three suns. Antagonist: Chad/Carl Pre-theme song saying: Yang/Wormholes! (laughs)
43	17	"Clown-Fu Fighting"	Mark Ackland	Eric Trueheart	Nick Cross	June 30, 2008	220
43	17	"Cat Smash Fever"	Ted Collyer	Sib Ventress	Ted Collyer & Paul Watling	June 30, 2008	220
Clown-Fu Fighting: Yang learns of a new fighting style called Clown Fu. He wants to learn the art, but Master Yo says no way, and backs it up with a "because I said so." But Yang learns from the four floating Woo Foo elders that something he needs to complete an armor suit he can only get from knowing Clown-Fu. Master Yo relents and lets him learn Clown-Fu. Yin tags along and learns how to unicycle. Yang has to decide whether to take the clown wig for Woo-Foo or leave it for Clown-Fu. Antagonist: The Numbercrunchers Cat Smash Fever: Yin and Yang are tired of the Chung Pow Kitties breaking in so much. So they spread false rumors to break up the group. But they just end up with a bigger problem: Three Chung Pow Kitty-like groups? Yin and Yang have to try to bring them back together. Antagonist: Black-Eyed Chung Pow Kitties, Chung Pow Kitties Revisited and Nine-Inch Tails. Pre-theme song saying: Yang/Send Yin! Send like the wind!
44	18	"Camp Magic Pants"	Mark Ackland	Mark Ackland & Riccardo Durante	Chad Hicks	July 7, 2008	217
44	18	"Worked Stiff"	Ted Collyer	Eric Trueheart	Jeff Barker	July 7, 2008	217
Camp Magic Pants: Yin is accepted to a camp for magical creatures, and Yang tags along because of Master Yo. Yin falls in love with Terry Otter and starts using her magic for evil purposes in order to win a contest. Meanwhile, a beast is starting to awaken, and Yuck takes control of the monster. Yin and Yang have to quit playing pranks on each other long enough to defeat the monster controlled by Yuck. Antagonist: Yuck and Terry Otter. Worked Stiff: When Yang tries to get a job in order to make enough money to buy shoes, he gets a job at Manga-topia Land. He's forced to wear a "Blue Bunny Dang" costume for his job. He is humiliated and disgraced by the children, and his co-workers are fired for bizarre reasons until the only ones left are Yang and the 'Squid-Guy'. However it is revealed that Smoke and Mirrors were behind all this, and when they attempt to destroy them, Yang must decide whether to get his payment and buy the sneakers or save his new friend. Antagonist: Smoke and Mirrors. Notes: Camp Magic Pants is a parody of the Harry Potter saga. Pre-theme song saying: Mirrors/You are rugged and beautiful!
45	19	"Mission Yinpossible"	Mark Ackland	Tom Mason & Dan Danko	Warren Leonhardt	July 14, 2008	221
45	19	"Disapp-Eared"	Ted Collyer	Bob Keyes, Chip Keyes & Doug Keyes	Troy Quane	July 14, 2008	221
Mission Yinpossible: Carl receives magical slippers that grant him his heart's desire. Carl's desire is for everyone to bow down to him as the ruler the planet. But instead, it gives Carl the love that his mother, Edna, gives more to Herman. When news comes about the new Carl-loving Edna moving into a new house for Carl, Yin and Yang try to steal the slippers from Carl because they think he's going to do something evil with them. Master Yo didn't like the idea because Carl hadn't done anything evil for more than three months, but they sneak off to Carl's new home and try to steal them anyway. Antagonist: Carl. Disapp-Eared: During the battle with a weird rhino, Yin tries out her new Yin-visibility technique. Yang was supposed to try his new move, but he didn't learn it last night. While watching the two Woo Foo warriors battle, Carl was impressed by Yin's new powers and decides to steal them with a machine that he bought from evilBay that can suck the powers out the anyone. Jealous of his sister and struggling with a power he's supposed to learn, Yang decides to learn his new move. But he makes a mistake and gets Yin's invisibility move instead. By misspeaking the magic words, Yang turns invisible and can go through anything, but no one can hear him. Meanwhile Yin is kidnapped by Carl. Antagonist: Carl. Pre-theme song saying: Yang/Did that come out of my mouth?
46	20	"Get Off My Back"	Mark Ackland	Phil Walsh, Amy Wolfram, Aydrea Ten Bosch & Bart Jennett	Craig Valde	July 21, 2008	222
46	20	"Slumber Party of Doom"	Ted Collyer	Aydrea Ten Bosch	Nick Cross	July 21, 2008	222
Get Off My Back: Yang and Carl fight over a replica of an enchanted hammer that is for sale in a store where Mastermind works. Mastermind tries to ruin their lives by fusing the two back-to-back. The only way to undo the curse is to cooperate. After they try to waste each other, they go to Carl's Castle, where Yang and Herman become close friends, and Carl's mom takes a liking to Yang. Afterward, they go to Yang's house where Carl impresses Yin and Yo with his cooking and grooming skills. The enemies will have to learn to be friends to be free of each other. Antagonist: Mastermind (And, to a lesser extent, Carl and Herman.) Slumber Party of Doom: Yin plans a 'fun' slumber party, but she starts blasting people carelessly and acting obsessive about the party, and confines Yang to his room. Meanwhile, one of the Woo Foo Elders contacts Yang, and he activates the "Woo Foo Book of Ultimate Eeeeeevil" to turn Yin's friends into mind-eating zombies. Yin will have to stop the rampage without sacrificing the fun of her slumber party. Antagonist: Zombie Girls (Hypnotized versions of Yin's friends created by Yang.) Notes: Scooby-Doo and Shaggy make cameos in "Slumber Party of Doom." Pre-theme song saying: Yo/Greasy little punks! Time to finish you off!
47	21	"Old Softie"	Mark Ackland	Eric Trueheart	Troy Quane	July 28, 2008	223
47	21	"Dance, Dance, Devastation"	Ted Collyer	Larry Todd Johnson & Steve Marmel	Mike Csunyoscka	July 28, 2008	223
Old Softie: Yin, Yang, and Yo win a trip to a pretzel factory where the head of the company shows them a large room filled with salt, a mustard river, and song-singing munchkins. But it's an evil plot tries to eliminate the Woo Foo warriors. The tour guide sets Master Yo up for serious injuries by using killer robots and pretzel snakes. The tour guide turns out to be their enemy Badfoot. Antagonist: Badfoot Special Guest Star: Orlando Brown as Badfoot. Dance, Dance Devastation: Yang is confident that he can beat Yin in every type of video game ever made. Carl decides to use the rabbits' competitive nature to his advantage. He creates a cursed video game where the object is to dance to get the highest score. But as soon as Yin and Yang get on it, they are forced to dance for their lives. If they stop dancing, they'll die. Meanwhile, Carl has a plan to poison the Town's president by using a Cookie of Doom. Antagonist: Carl and the Dance Monkey Pre-theme song saying: Carl/Ah, pimplesticks!
48	22	"Upstanding Yuck"	Ted Collyer	Spencer Walker & Sib Ventress	Chad Hicks	August 4, 2008	224
48	22	"Walk in the Woods"	Mark Ackland	Rich Fogel	Warren Leonhardt	August 4, 2008	224
Upstanding Yuck: While Yin and Yang make a toilet paper run for Master Yo, they come face-to-face with Yuck. But Yuck has changed. Both Yin and Yang don't believe that Yuck is now a good guy, so they follow Yuck to see what his new evil plan is. Yuck goes to the city, donates all his savings to a Redneckistan care program, helps President Muffin's kitten, changes a flat tire, and cleans Master Yo's toe jam. But Yin and Yang still don't believe that Yuck has truly changed. Antagonist: Yuck Walk in the Woods: Master Yo sees that both Yin and Yang are tired from doing easy jobs around the dojo, and sends them into the woods to gain their strength back without the help of technology like cellphones, computers, and TV. While Yin and Yang are walking in the woods, re-live different fairy tales, such as Three Billy Goats Gruff, Goldilocks and the Three Bears, and Hansel and Gretel. Antagonist: Witch in the Gingerbread House Pre-theme song saying: Yang/The (spitting) noise comes later!
49	23	"Welcome to the Dark Tomorrow"	Mark Ackland	Sib Ventress & Steve Marmel	Riccardo Durante & Nick Cross	August 11, 2008	225
When Yang gets the all-powerful "I'm with Doofus" T-shirt, he finally finishes his Woo Foo suit of armor. The four floating Elder Heads tell him he needs to put the armor in a sack and throw it into The Night Master's den fireplace at midnight. To do this, Yang signs Yin up for a party club, which means she would host a party that night. Yang convinces her to host it at The Night Master's lair. During the party, Yang sneaks into the den, but when he throws the sack into the fire, Eradicus bursts out. Turns out, the Elders are Eradicus' Minions! Eradicus starts The Dark Tomorrow, which makes everything backwards. When Yin and Yang make it out, they kidnap Master Yo, and then both Yin and Master Yo lose Yang's trust after Yin got kidnapped by evil friends to minions. Yang runs into the League Of Evil (now the League of Goody Two-Shoes) and gets armor. Yang goes to fight Eradicus without any help or trust from Yin or Master Yo. Antagonist: Eradicus and his minions Pre-theme song saying: Yang/How dynamic!
50	24	"Today You Are a Bear"	Mark Ackland	Sib Ventress	Craig Valde	August 18, 2008	226
50	24	"Pets Peeved"	Ted Collyer	Rob Hummel	Frank Lintzen	August 18, 2008	226
Today You Are a Bear: After being going to Vinny's Bear Mitzvah, Yin and Yang want to be bears after having a great time. The bears' enemy, Ranger Ron, takes advantage of it creating an alias of Bo Grizzly and opening a Bear school. But this school teaches you how not to be a bear. When Yin and Yang go to their Bear Mitzvah, their behavior is the opposite of what it should be. Before they know it, they are under attack by dozens of grizzly bears. Antagonist: Ranger Ron Pets Peeved: When Yang watches a video about a PuppyGriff and the VCR explodes, Yang tells Master Yo that the next best thing is to get a PuppyGriff! Yin tries to convince Master Yo that Yang is too irresponsible, but it doesn't work and Yang gets a PuppyGriff. Yang names it Li'l ShnozFace after the movie he was watching. Yang quickly gets bored and looks for something fun to do. To go have fun, he ties Li'l Shnozface to a train. When the PuppyGriff comes back three months later, he hand grown into a wolf. Then Yin and Yang meet Rita, who makes them her pets. Can Yang gain Li'l Shnozface's trust to escape? Antagonist: Rita Pre-theme song saying: Yang/(laughs) Bacon!
51	25	"For the Love of Clamboy"	Mark Ackland	Eric Trueheart	Troy Quane	September 28, 2008	219
51	25	"Zarnot's Girlfriend"	Ted Collyer	Scott Sonneborn	Warren Leonhardt & Craig Valde	September 28, 2008	219
For the Love of Clamboy!: Yin becomes materialistic and finds a clam boy named Clamuel who will give her beautiful pearls if she dates him. He tries to get her into a "clam wedding." Yin refuses to tell him she's using him and goes anyway. But Yin refuses to marry Clamuel, and he turns into a large clam monster. Yin discovers that the beast is unbeatable, so she accepts the marriage proposal. When Yin kisses him, he becomes a "hot" clam-boy. About an hour later, they return to the clam-cave, and Clamuel kicks Yin out. Yang explains how an hour is about 100 clam years. Antagonist: Clamuel's Clam Monster Zarnot's Girlfriend: Zarnot is out to get Yang for the times he has been stuffed into his old toy box. But every time he fires missiles or his laser, he misses Yang and hits Lina or something else that causes a chain reaction. Zarnot doesn't know why Yang isn't fighting back until he finds out that Yang is dating Lina. In order to understand Yang's new way, Zarnot builds a girlfriend for himself. The girlfriend is built with the same emotions and attitude as Lina. When Zarnot spends the day with his new girlfriend, he now knows how to defeat Yang and leaves his girlfriend to fight Yang. When the girlfriend feels hurt from being dumped, she goes after Zarnot to destroy him. Antagonist: Zarnot, Girlbotica Pre-theme song saying: Lina/Ooh! Better buckle my fun belt!
52	26	"The Secret Life of Possum Panda"	Ted Collyer	Eric Trueheart & Scott Sonneborn	Frank Lintzen	September 29, 2008	233
52	26	"Dummy Up"	Ted Collyer	Sib Ventress	Daniel Lafrance	September 29, 2008	233
The Secret Life of Possum Panda: Multiple sightings of Possum Panda (a Batman parody) has made Yang want to become a vigilante. Unfortunately, Master Yo has amnesia and can't remember he is Possum Panda and sleepwalks as him. Yang searches for Possum Panda and finds him being attacked by the Puffin's goons. The Puffin has placed a bomb somewhere in the city, and Possum Panda and Dark Yang are the only things standing in between stopping the Puffin and their town become a crater. Antagonist: The Puffin Dummy Up: When Yo goes to a pretzel all-you-can-eat buffet, Yang starts to miss Yo, though he doesn't want to admit it. He carries a dummy of Yo around in a backpack, and everyone keeps trying to see what's inside, though Yang won't let them. When Zarnot finds out, he wants to embarrass Yang with the information. Antagonist: Zarnot, Indestructo-Bob Pre-theme song saying: Yang/There, now you even smell like Master Yo.
53	27	"The Howl of The Weenie"	Ted Collyer	Eric Trueheart	Craig Valde & Daniel Lafrance	October 6, 2008	227
This episode is the Halloween special. Its Weenie-Howl where kids dress up as monsters and go brick-or-eating. Eradicus hatches a plot to harvest people's scares to feed the Weeniehowl, a horrid monster that could destroy the whole city. Antagonist: Eradicus and his minions. Pre-theme song saying: Yang/Okay, diaper rash is just annoying.
54	28	"Game Over"	Chad Hicks	Sib Ventress	Riccardo Durante	October 27, 2008	234
54	28	"Creeping With the Enemy"	Chad Hicks	Rich Fogel & Bart Jennett	Nick Cross	October 27, 2008	234
Game Over: While Yo is gone, leaving Yin and Yang to look out for themselves, The Manotaur tries to demolish the dojo and build condos on the site. To prevent this, Dave wagers The Manotaur on a game of Wowza Wowza! If The Manotaur wins, not only do Yin and Yang have to give him their dojo, but their lives as well! Antagonist: The Manotaur Special Guest Star: Seth MacFarlane as The Manotaur. Creeping with the Enemy: Eradicus has created a coffee business called Eradicorp. He curses the coffee so that when anyone drinks their tenth cup, they become evil. When Carl finds out his mother and brother are working for Eradicorp, he tries to assemble the League of Evil, but Smoke, The Puffin, Pondscum, and Ultimoose are also working for Eradicorp. Desperate to find friends, Carl joins Yin and Yang, who are gathering people to stop Eradicus. He disguises himself as a skateboarding dude named CarlMeister, and Yin and Yang pick him to stop Eradicus's minions who are transporting a shipment of the evil coffee. Antagonist: Indestructi-Bob, Ella Mental, Rubber Chucky Pre-Theme song saying: The Manotaur/Give it up, you floaty-eared freaks!
55	29	"The Yindianapolis 500"	Ted Collyer	Rob Hummel & Bart Jennett	Frank Lintzen	November 10, 2008	235
55	29	"Personality Problem"	Chad Hicks	Van Partible	Craig Valde	November 10, 2008	235
The Yindianapolis 500: Yin and Yang are jealous that they're not old enough to drive. But, they borrow the car in the dojo to drive around town anyway. Meanwhile, Smoke and Mirrors capture the mayor and force him to announce that whoever wins a race gets a pass to be able to drive, no matter their age. Yin and Yang join the race, along with Carl, Ultimoose, and Herman. Antagonist: Smoke, Mirrors, Carl, Ultimoose, Herman Personality Problem: Yuck uses a level-five aura switch attack on Yin and Yang to distract them, giving time for Yuck to run amok. Antagonist: Yuck Notes: The Yindianapolis 500 is a parody of Speed Racer. Pre-theme song saying: Yang/What's a boy to do?
56	30	"Season's Beatings"	Mark Ackland	Sib Ventress & Steve Marmel	Warren Leonhardt	November 24, 2008	203
56	30	"Splitting Hares"	Ted Collyer	Eric Trueheart & Steve Marmel	Nick Cross	November 24, 2008	203
Season's Beatings: Master Yo tries to explain to Yin and Yang that a holiday similar to Christmas for all Woo Foo knights, isn't just about getting toys. But Yin and Yang won't listen, and Master Yo buys the toys they wanted. However, the toys are robots made by Zarnot. The robots are designed to make parents mad because one piece of the robot won't fit. Zarnot combines these robot to attack the dojo, and Yin and Yang must stop Zarnot and his new army of robot toys. Antagonist: Zarnot Splitting Hares: Yin decides to give Yang a break from being a Woo Foo knight and gets a new partner, and Yang gets a new partner, too. However their new partners can't help them stop Carl. Yin and Yang will have to rejoin as partners in order to battle Carl. Antagonist: Carl and Herman Pre-theme song saying: Yang/Ooh, I got drool in my eye!
57	31	"Extra Cheese, Anchovies and Doom!"	Chad Hicks	Rob Hummel	Troy Quane	February 14, 2009	228
57	31	"The Confidence Game"	Ted Collyer	Sib Ventress & Steve Marmel	Mike Csunyoscka	February 14, 2009	228
Extra Cheese, Anchovies and Doom!: After Yo teaches Yin the immobilize attack, Yo decides to order pizza and make Yin and Yang pay for it. Yin tries to make the pizza man late (thus granting them a free pizza) by using her new technique. As punishment, Yo makes Yin and Yang deliver the pizzas for the immobilized pizza man. But there is a curse. If you use magic to deliver pizza, you start to turn into a pizza. But all their adversaries are out to make them late, so Yin and Yang must use magic. Antagonist: Everyone who tried to make them late (Ninjas, Dave And Eradicus/Indestructo-Bob). The Confidence Game: Eradicus tries to lower Yin and Yang's confidence and is succeeding. Because Yo is annoyed that the children use him as an escape plan, Yo pretends to die from an attack by Eradicus, leaving Yin and Yang to fight Eradicus and his minions alone, thus boosting their confidence. Antagonist: Eradicus and his minions. Note: This is the first Yin Yang Yo! episode to be on Disney XD Pre-theme song saying: Yang/(laughs) Cool.
58	32	"Roboticus Maximus"	Chad Hicks	Eric Trueheart	Nick Cross	February 21, 2009	229
58	32	"Size Matters"	Ted Collyer	Aydrea Ten Bosch & Bart Jennett	Frank Lintzen	February 21, 2009	229
Roboticus Maximus: Pondscum, Zarnot, and Fastidious join Mastermind to try to destroy Yin and Yang with a robot. But Yin and Yang are too busy fighting over leadership than Mastermind's robot. Luckily a new recruit might be able to defeat Mastermind. Antagonist: Pondscum, Zarnot, Fastidious, Master Mind. Size Matters: Lina makes Yang jealous by hanging out with strong men. Carl uses this to make Yang his sidekick, and makes him super strong but super stupid. Antagonists: Carl, Lina (for trying to make Yang jealous). Pre-theme song saying: Yang/Well, I'll tidy your tots!
59	33	"Unmoving Pictures"	Chad Hicks	Eric Trueheart	Mike Csunyoscka	February 28, 2009	230
59	33	"The Recline and Fall of Civilization"	Ted Collyer	Evan Gore & Bart Jennett	Frank Lintzen	February 28, 2009	230
Unmoving Pictures: Eradicus' latest plan to destroy the Woo Foo Warriors is to have his minions, disguised as Hollywood filmmakers, convince Yin and Yang to star in a movie. But the movie is actually an elaborate trap rigged for their doom. Antagonist: Eradicus, Rubber-Chuckie, Ella Mental, Indestructi-Bob The Recline and Fall of Civilization: Yang discovers that the recliner Master Yo sits on is inhabited by a bunch of microscopic creatures. Master Yo and Yin don't believe Yang even though the creatures have made tried to make their presence known to Master Yo. Yang uses the Woo Foo Battle Cruiser to shrink down to the size of the creatures to prove his theory. But he's unaware that a mad genius who lives on the chair, Professor Whackjob, wants to use the Woo Foo Battle Cruiser in order to get big enough to boss all of his fellow citizens around. Antagonist: Professor Whackjob Pre-theme song saying: Yang/I don't even wanna know where that liquid comes from!
60	34	"Mind Games"	Chad Hicks	Aydrea Ten Bosch, Sib Ventress & Steve Marmel	Nick Cross	March 7, 2009	231
60	34	"The Carl of the Wild"	Chad Hicks	Sib Ventress	Frank Lintzen	March 7, 2009	231
Mind Games: Master Yo teaches Yin and Yang to clear their minds to keep Ella Mental from reading their thoughts, but Yang is too careless to keep everyone from hearing his deepest thoughts. Antagonist: Eradicus and Ella Metal The Carl of the Wild: There is a $100,000 reward for the capture of a rare beast: A kangaroo/ape hybrid called the Kong-aroo! Yang wants to find the beast for the money, and Yin wants to help the creature protect itself from hunters. But when Yang's competition is Carl, and Carl is even more determined than usual to get his way, Yin and Yang will join to keep him from catching the Kong-aroo. Antagonist: Carl Pre-theme song saying: Carl/A bird biscuit on my good cape!
61	35	"Clothes Encounters"	Ted Collyer	Rich Fogel	Craig Valde	March 14, 2009	232
61	35	"Commander-in-Cheat"	Chad Hicks	Eric Trueheart	Frank Lintzen	March 14, 2009	232
Clothes Encounters: Yin and Yang won't wash their clothes, and eventually the dirty laundry (which has soaked up Woo Foo powers) comes alive. All it wants is to be clean, but Smoke and Mirrors want to use it to make a 'bad problem worse than it already is' by using it as a forever friend. Antagonist: Smoke and Mirrors. Commander-in-Cheat: President Muffin uses Yin and Yang's Woo Foo to make him look good on camera. He also wants to claim a chalice from a Woo Foo temple. However, Carl has his eyes on it, too. Antagonist: Carl and Muffin. Pre-theme song saying: Yang/Enough with the bananas!
62	36	"Party Troopers"	Ted Collyer	Eric Trueheart & Sib Ventress	Daniel Lafrance	March 21, 2009	237
62	36	"Shadowcluck"	Chad Hicks	Eric Trueheart & Sib Ventress	Troy Quane	March 21, 2009	237
Party Troopers: Yo tells Yin and Yang to gather a Woo Foo army. Instead, they throw a party. Eradicus takes over a supermarket to crash the party. Antagonist: Eradicus and his minions. Shadowcluck: Coop convinces Yin that he can control The Night Master's energy and fight alongside them, but in battle, the 'Yoop' are too focused on each other than fighting Eradicus' army. The heroes have to focus long enough to eradicate their enemy. Antagonist: Eradicus' army and minions. Pre-theme song saying: Yang/Welcome back, Floopsy-Woopsy!
63	37	"Yin! Yang! You!"	Chad Hicks	Steve Marmel, Sib Ventress, Eric Trueheart & Bart Jennett	Chad Hicks & Riccardo Durante	April 5, 2009	236
Yin! Yang! You! It's Lina's birthday, and Yin and Yang each want to celebrate her birthday without the other one around. When Carl finds that Lina has the power to make Yin and Yang fight each other, he sends her to Earth. She lands in Jason Earles' yard and becomes his dog. Carl sends Yin and Yang to Earth to trap them there, but Yin sends Carl there too. Yin and Yang land in England and try to get to Lina in Hollywood, and Carl lands in a restaurant where he makes everyone flee. Then thousands of Earth cockroaches come and make him their leader to rule the Earth and cause the Dark Tomorrow. Trouble comes when Yin and Yang start to turn into Earth rabbits, Lina into an Earth dog, and Carl into an Earth cockroach. Yin and Yang have to rescue Lina, defeat Carl, and make it back to their own dimension. Meanwhile Mitchel Musso is not invited to Jason Earle's birthday bash so Mitchel Musso and Jason Earles become rivals over their hairstyle and battle, after Carl is defeated Mitchel and Jason become friends. Antagonist: Carl. Special Guest Star: Jason Earles as himself and Mitchel Musso as himself. Pre-theme song saying: Yang/Where's Holly-would (Mis-pronounced)?
64	38	"Division Quest"	Ted Collyer	Steve Marmel, Sib Ventress, Eric Trueheart & Bart Jennett	Frank Lintzen & Riccardo Durante	April 11, 2009	238
Eradicus decides that the best way to fight the Woo Foo Army is to divide them and then conquer them. He sends his minions Ella Mental and Indestructo-Bob to destroy Dave and Jobeaux respectively. That means Yin and Yang will have to guide the two novice Woo Foo Warriors to exceptional heights and inspire them to become stronger fighters if they want to have a shot at beating evil. Meanwhile, Master Yo has problems of his own during his vacation when he runs into Eradicus. Unable to fight each other on spa grounds, Master Yo and Eradicus have to keep their tempers in check while they're both vacationing with each other. Antagonist: Eradicus and his minions Pre-theme song saying: Yang/Big bucket of pathetic!
65	39	"Yin Yang Who?"	Chad Hicks	Bart Jennett, Sib Ventress & Eric Trueheart	Steven Remen	April 18, 2009	239
Yin, Yang Who?: In the series finale, Eradicus makes his move to destroy the town after draining Yo's Woo Foo aura. Then he goes after Yin's. Both Yin and Yang embark on a quest to find their parents and retrieve a Woo Foo aura donation, which is the only way to save Yin. The twins discover that Master Yo is actually their biological father, who had his memory of this erased so he could train them "without bias and fear." After learning that Yo is their dad, Yin asks, "If [Master Yo is] our father, then who the heck is our mother?". But even after this, it's never revealed who Yin and Yang's biological mother is. Antagonist: Eradicus and his minions Pre-theme song saying: Yang/(laughs) That never gets old!
