= My Own Private Oshawa =

My Own Private Oshawa is a theatrical play written and performed by Jonathan Wilson, which premiered in 1996. A one-man show taking place aboard a GO Train in which Wilson is travelling home from Toronto to Oshawa for a visit, the show is performed as a monologue about his childhood experiences as a repressed and closeted gay kid, and the impact of his more flamboyantly gay friend Gordon on his sense of self. The ultimate purpose of the trip, to attend Gordon's funeral following his death of AIDS, is revealed only at the end of the play.

The play was staged for the first time in July 1996 at the Toronto Fringe Festival, where it was one of the major hits of the festival; due to its popularity, it was later remounted by Tarragon Theatre in the fall. The Tarragon production received two Dora Mavor Moore Award nominations (Small Theatre division) in 1997, for Outstanding New Play or Musical and Outstanding Performance by a Male (Wilson).

== Film adaptation ==
In 1998, the play was optioned by producer Sandra Faire for adaptation as a theatrical film. Directed by Allan Manson, the film directly introduced the plot point that Wilson was an actor performing My Own Private Oshawa as a stage show, but was primarily structured as a conventional narrative with a multi-actor cast rather than being performed exclusively by Wilson. Its cast included Shaun Majumder, Martha Chaves, Gavin Crawford, Lou Eisen, Brigitte Gall, Ed Sahely and Christopher Peterson. The film was screened at the Columbus International Film & Video Festival in 2002, but was not widely distributed until being broadcast by CTV Television Network as a Pride Week special on June 25, 2005.
