= Clementine Ford (writer) =

Australian feminist writer

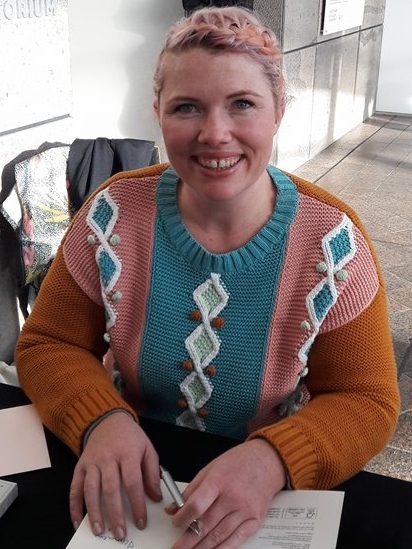
- Ford at a book signing in 2017
- Born: 1980 or 1981 (age 45–46)
- Citizenship: Australian
- Education: University of Adelaide
- Occupations: Writer, feminist
- Children: 1

Clementine Ford (born 1980 or 1981) is an Australian feminist writer, columnist, broadcaster and public speaker on women's rights and other social and political issues.

== Personal life ==
Ford spent much of her childhood growing up in the Middle East, specifically in Oman on the eastern border of the United Arab Emirates. At the age of 12, her family relocated to England. Ford spent the remainder of her teenage years in Adelaide, South Australia. As a teenager, she struggled with body image, body dysmorphia and an eating disorder.

Ford studied at the University of Adelaide, where she took a gender studies course; she describes this as a personal catalyst for her decision to become a women's rights activist. During her time at the university she also worked as an editor and contributor for the student newspaper On Dit.

Ford moved from Adelaide to Melbourne in 2011. She announced the birth of her son in August 2016. Ford has stated that raising her son with little assistance from her partner put pressure on the relationship, which she left.

== Career ==
Ford is known as a journalist, author and feminist activist. In 2018, Monash University lecturer Michelle Smith considered Ford to be "Australia's most prominent contemporary feminist".

Ford's writing career includes her contributions as a columnist. Ford wrote a regular column for Daily Life for seven years. In 2007, Ford began writing a column for Adelaide's Sunday Mail and also began writing for The Drum. Topics Ford wrote about included destigmatising abortion; she described having an abortion herself as an easy decision that she feels no shame for. In 2014, she wrote of her outrage towards comments made by Cory Bernardi which labelled pro-choice advocates "pro-death" soldiers of the "death industry". Later that year, she wrote an opinion piece against a Victorian bill that would change the state's abortion laws, arguing that if politicians really cared about the lives of women and girls that they would advocate for improved access to birth control, including terminations.

In September 2016, Allen & Unwin published Ford's first book, Fight Like a Girl. Her second book, Boys Will Be Boys: Power, Patriarchy and Toxic Masculinity, was published in 2018.

In January 2019, Ford resigned from her role as a columnist with The Sydney Morning Herald and The Age, alleging that in September 2018 she had been disciplined over a tweet calling then prime minister Scott Morrison "a fucking disgrace" for his negative comments concerning teacher training on identifying and supporting potentially transgender students, and that she had been told it was the paper's new policy to refrain from "disrespect[ing] the office of the PM". Fairfax Media responded that their social media policy, which covered contributors, prohibited the use of "abusive language".

In February 2020, Ford began a podcast called Big Sister Hotline in which she talks about contemporary feminist issues with guests such as Florence Given and Yasmin Abdel-Magied.

In October of 2025 Ford lost her Instagram and Facebook accounts after posts she made regarding the assassination of Charlie Kirk. In response, Ford has pledged to release her own social media application.

In early 2026, Clementine Ford announced that she would be raising funds in order to be able to join the Australian Delegation of the Global Sumud Flotilla in March of 2026.

=== 2024 doxxing incident ===
In February 2024, Ford re-shared leaked details of a private WhatsApp group called "J.E.W.I.S.H creatives and academics", after some members of the group discussed ways to jeopardise Ford's employment because she was a pro-Palestinian activist. Ford said the leak was a response to attempts to "silence voices calling for Palestinian liberation". Ford's action caused debate in the media on whether her actions were justified, with the Executive Council of Australian Jewry and some outlets accusing her of antisemitism. Ford responded by saying the fact the group members were Jewish was "utterly irrelevant" to her sharing their information.

== Publications ==
- Ford, Clementine (2016). Fight Like a Girl. Sydney, NSW: Allen & Unwin. ISBN 978-1-76029-236-2.
- —————————— (2018). Boys Will Be Boys: Power, Patriarchy and the Toxic Bonds of Mateship. Crows Nest, NSW: Allen & Unwin. ISBN 978-1-76063-233-5.
- —————————— (2021). How We Love: Notes on a Life. Sydney, NSW: Allen & Unwin. ISBN 978-1-76087-718-7.
- —————————— (2023). I Don't: The Case Against Marriage. Sydney, NSW: Allen & Unwin. ISBN 978-1-76106-966-6.
