= Kathy Greenwood =

Canadian actress and comedian (born 1962)

- Born: Kathryn Greenwood; March 21, 1962 (age 64); Scarborough, Ontario, Canada
- Occupations: Actress, comedian
- Years active: 1987–present
- Spouse: John Dolin
- Children: 2
- Awards: Canadian Comedy Award for Best Female Improviser

Kathryn Greenwood (born March 21, 1962) is a Canadian actress and comedian. She appeared on the American version of Whose Line Is It Anyway? numerous times, and played Grace Bailey on the Canadian television drama series Wind at My Back.

== Life and career ==
Greenwood was born in Scarborough, Ontario to Edwin Greenwood. From an early age she wanted to be a performer and went to school at Agincourt Collegiate Institute. There she performed in school plays and concerts. After graduation in 1980, Greenwood spent the next two years studying acting at the American Academy of Dramatic Arts.

In 1987, she returned to Toronto, and worked in a small night club act called A Wedge of Night. She spent five years with the Toronto branch of The Second City comedy troupe as a writer and a performer. Two of her shows won Dora Mavor Moore awards in 1988 and 1992.

Shortly afterwards, she and her friends Jonathan Wilson and Ed Sahely developed what she called their "Second City" spin-off, Not to Be Repeated, in which the three improvised an entire situation comedy in front of a live audience, based solely on ideas and suggestions from the audience. She also appeared with Shirley Douglas and Kiefer Sutherland in The Glass Menagerie at the Royal Alexandra Theatre in spring 1997. Other notable appearances in Canada include This Hour Has 22 Minutes and Royal Canadian Air Farce.

In 1996, Greenwood began regular work on Canadian television on the family drama series Wind at My Back. She worked for five years, full-time, playing Grace Bailey, a junior radio M.C. in the small town of New Bedford, Ontario, during the Great Depression. Her portrayal of Grace Bailey was nominated for a Gemini Award for Best Performance By an Actress in a Continuing Leading Role. In 1999, Kathy was cast as Denise Stanton in the TV movie Switching Goals, starring Mary-Kate and Ashley Olsen. Later that same year, Greenwood commuted to Los Angeles to appear on such shows as The Drew Carey Show, the updated version of Hollywood Squares, and the American version of the improvisation game show Whose Line Is It Anyway?.

== Marriage and family ==
Greenwood is married to television writer John Dolin; they have two daughters.

== Current projects ==
Greenwood is part of the sketch comedy troupe Women Fully Clothed, featuring what Eugene Levy calls "the five funniest women in Canada." The group saw success in Canada and appeared in Edinburgh, Scotland.

== Filmography ==
=== Film ===
Year	Title	Role	Notes
1992	This Is My Life	Young Matron	
1994	New Nightmare	Nurse in Hospital Room with Heather	
1995	House	Kathy	
1996	Kids in the Hall: Brain Candy	Ginny Hurdicure	
1999	Switching Goals	Dr. Denise Stanton	
2003	Flip Phone	Katie	Short film
2005	The Man	Flight Attendant	
2005	Anne: Journey to Green Gables	Mavis (voice)	Video
2005	Heidi	Aunt Dete (voice)	
2014	Get Santa	Miscellaneous crew (Accountant)	
2015	Poltergeist	Realtor	
2016	My Big Fat Greek Wedding 2	Marge	
2016	Unless	Willow Halliday	
2021	8-Bit Christmas	Mrs. Hugo	
2021	The Exchange	Mrs. Fleming	
2023	World's Best	Ms. Sage	
2023	The King Tide	Charlotte	
2023	EXmas	Jeannie	

=== Television ===
Year	Title	Role	Notes
1992	This Hour Has 22 Minutes	Writer	
1993	Street Legal	Jacky Kepler	Episode: "Believe the Children"
1993	Maniac Mansion	Allanah	Episode: "Love Letters"
1993	Women on Trial: The Lawrencia Bembenek Story	Sylvia Bonner	TV movie
1994	Hostage for a Day	SWAT One	TV movie
1994	Squawk Box	Various	Main cast member
1994	RoboCop: The Series	Director	Episode: "Midnight Minus One"
1995	Goosebumps	Ms. Walker	Episode: "The Phantom of the Auditorium"
1996	The High Life	Judy	Episode: "Bowling"
1996–2001	Wind at My Back	Grace Bailey Mainwairing and Gams O'Malley	Main role
1997	Once a Thief	Margo	Episode: "Trial Marriage"
1998	Stories from My Childhood	(voice)	2 episodes
1998	History Bites	Various	2 episodes
1999	George and Martha	Frieda	
1999	The Wonderful World of Disney	Denise Stanton	Episode: "Switching Goals"
1999	Switching Goals	Denise Stanton	TV movie
2000	The 2000 Canadian Comedy Awards	Self (Pretty Funny Female Improv)	TV special
2000	The Pooch and the Pauper	Kim Corbett	TV film
2000	The Drew Carey Show	Kathryn	Episode: "Drew Live II"
2000–2007	Whose Line Is It Anyway?	Self	
2001	The Broad Side	Various roles	
2001	This Sitcom Is...Not to Be Repeated	Various roles	
2001	I Was a Rat	Lucasta Utensil	Miniseries
2001	Hollywood Squares	Self	Episode: January 25, 2001
2002	Kids in the Hall: Tour of Duty		Documentary
2002	Moville Mysteries	Mrs. Caliente	Episode: "The Day Rico Became Smart"
2002	Royal Canadian Air Farce	Senior Citizen #3/Dr. Stilwart	Episode: "10.9"
2003	Open Mike with Mike Bullard	Guest	Episode: February 20, 2003
2003	Royal Canadian Air Farce	Various	Episode: "Best of #3"
2003–2005	JoJo's Circus	Dr. Seltzer (voice)	Recurring role
2004	XPM	Laura Macdonald	
2004	Wonderfalls	Ronnie	Episode: "Wax Lion"
2004	The Wrong Coast	Debbie Sue Ashanti-Melendez	Miniseries
2004	Listen Missy	Various	
2004	This Hour Has 22 Minutes	Various	3 episodes
2005	Distinguished Artists	Self	Episode: "Women Fully Clothed"
2005	Queer as Folk	Lila	Episode: "5.2"
2005	Maple Shorts!	Sela Salmon (voice)	Episode: "Eat My Shorts"
2006	Getting Along Famously	Sister Gregory "Sister Song" Pechiccino	Episode: "Sister Song"
2006	Captain Flamingo	Milo's Mom (voice)	
2007	Women Fully Clothed: All Dressed Up and Places to Go	Self	Documentary
2007	The Jane Show	Whitney Johnson	Episode: "The House of Jane"
2009	The Rick Mercer Report	Guest	Episode: "#7.1"
2009	The Dating Guy	Valerie (voice)	Episode: "Really Bad Lieutenant"
2010	CBC Winnipeg Comedy Festival	Self	Documentary
2010	CBC Winnipeg Comedy Festival	Self/Writer	Episode: "Savings and Groans"
2011	The Ron James Show	Self	Episode: "#3.3"
2011	Justin Time	Cleopatra	Episode: "Brave Sir Justin & Cleopatra's Cat"
2012	Frenemies	Lisa Logan	TV movie
2012	I, Martin Short, Goes Home	Mother	TV movie
2012–2013	Sidekick	Cindy Struction (voice)	2 episodes
2013	Satisfaction	Bonnie	Episode: "Mo Money, Mo Problems"
2013–2014	The Rick Mercer Report	Rick's Wife	13 episodes
2014	Working the Engels	Grace van der Hooven	Episode: "The Crazy Family"
2014	Saving Hope	Rita Brown	Episode: "Stand By Me"
2014	The Stanley Dynamic	Officer Vicky	Episode: "The Stanley Crime"
2015	Remedy	Marg Hendrickson	Episode: "Life in Technicolor"
2017	Man Seeking Woman	Picklepop	Episode: "Popcorn"
2017	Taken Too Far	Gaby	TV movie
2019	Cavendish	Ruth	Main role
2020	Unlocking Christmas	Maggie Matthews	TV movie
2021–2025	Ghosts	Margaret Farnsby	6 episodes
2023–2024	So Help Me Todd	Patty	2 episodes
2023–2024	Ruby and the Well	Val	3 episodes

== Awards/Nominations ==
Awards
Year	Award	Category	Production	Result
1992	Dora Mavor Moore Award	Outstanding New Revue or Musical	The Second City	Won
1996	Gemini	Best Performance by an Actress in a Continuing Leading Role	Wind at My Back	Nominated
1998	Dora Mavor Moore Award	Outstanding New Revue or Musical	The Second City	Won
2000	Canadian Comedy Award	Best Female Improviser		Won
2005	Canadian Comedy Award	Best Sketch Troupe	Women Fully Clothed	Nominated
