= This Sitcom Is...Not to Be Repeated =

Canadian comedy television series

- Starring: Ed Sahely; Kathy Greenwood; Jonathan Wilson
- Country of origin: Canada
- No. of episodes: 15

Production
- Running time: 30 minutes

Original release
- Network: The Comedy Network
- Release: June 6 – September 12, 2001

This Sitcom Is...Not to Be Repeated is a Canadian comedy television series, which aired on The Comedy Network in 2001. Created by and starring Ed Sahely, Kathy Greenwood and Jonathan Wilson based on their stage show Not to Be Repeated, the series incorporated improvisational comedy techniques.

Each episode of the series was structured as a sitcom episode with a narrative framework, but at various points the actors would be called upon to draw lines submitted by viewers out of a hat, and incorporate them into the dialogue. Fifteen episodes of the show were produced.

== Episodes ==
| No. | Title | Directed by | Original release date |
|---|---|---|---|
| 1 | "Lie Down, No Stand Up, No Lie Down" | Allan Manson | 6 June 2001 |
| 2 | "Please Put Your Seats and Trays in the Upright Position" | Allan Manson | 13 June 2001 |
| 3 | "Guess What, I'm Not Wearing Any Underwear Today" | Allan Manson | 20 June 2001 |
| 4 | "That's Gonna Leave a Mark" | Allan Manson | 27 June 2001 |
| 5 | "Sex Is Like a Box of Chocolates" | Allan Manson | 4 July 2001 |
| 6 | "Beauty is in the Eye of the Drinker, ah, Beholder" | Allan Manson | 11 July 2001 |
| 7 | "I Like the Night Life, I Like to Boogie" | Allan Manson | 18 July 2001 |
| 8 | "Wasn't That Mole on Your Left Cheek?" | Allan Manson | 25 July 2001 |
| 9 | "Well Beat Me with an Ugly Stick" | Allan Manson | 1 August 2001 |
| 10 | "Sell My Clothes, I'm Going to Heaven" | Allan Manson | 8 August 2001 |
| 11 | "I Am Enjoyment Boy" | Allan Manson | 15 August 2001 |
| 12 | "It Hangs a Little to the Left" | Allan Manson | 22 August 2001 |
| 13 | "I'll Sleep with You but I Won't Do Your Laundry" | Allan Manson | 29 August 2001 |
| 14 | "I Think I Know What Victoria's Secret Is: She's a Slut" | Allan Manson | 5 September 2001 |
| 15 | "Bite Me and I'm Yours" | Allan Manson | 12 September 2001 |
