= Cocktail (disambiguation) =

A cocktail is a mixed drink containing alcohol.

Cocktail may also refer to:

- Fruit cocktail, a mixture of various fruits, often canned
- Shrimp cocktail, also known as a prawn cocktail, a type of seafood cocktail
- Cocktail dress, a shorter length lady's gown
- Molotov cocktail, a crude incendiary weapon
- A mixture of drugs, especially a mixture of Antiretroviral drugs used to treat HIV sometimes called a "triple cocktail"
- A style of arcade cabinet where the screen lies horizontal and players generally sit opposite each other to play
- In scuba diving with a rebreather, slang for caustic liquid getting in circuit if water gets at its absorbent

== Entertainment ==
- Cocktail (code name), the code name of Apple's iTunes LP music format
- Cocktail (magazine), a Swedish and Norwegian erotic magazine edited by Linda Johansen
- Cocktails (film), a 1928 British comedy film
- "Cocktails" (The Office), a 2007 episode of the television series The Office
- Cocktail (1988 film), an American film starring Tom Cruise
- Cocktail (2006 film), a Hong Kong film directed by Ching Long and Herman Yau
- Cocktail (2010 film), a Malayalam-language film starring Jayasurya and Samrvitha Sunil
- Cocktail (2012 film), a Hindi-language film starring Saif Ali Khan and Deepika Padukone
- Cocktail (2020 film), a Tamil-language comedy film starring Yogi Babu
- Cocktail (album), a 2003 album by the Mexican electronic pop band Belanova
- Cocktails (album), an album by Too Short
- "Cocktail" (song), 2018 song by D-Block Europe and Yxng Bane
- "Cocktails" (song), 2009 song by Hot Leg

== See also ==
- The Coctails, spelled without a 'k,' a defunct Chicago jazz/lounge quartet
- Cocktail party (disambiguation)
