= Boys Will Be Boys (Ford book) =

2018 book by Clementine Ford

- Author: Clementine Ford
- Language: English
- Subject: toxic masculinity
- Published: 2018
- Publisher: Oneworld Publications; Allen & Unwin
- ISBN: 978-1-76087-862-7

Boys Will Be Boys: Power, Patriarchy and the Toxic Bonds of Mateship is a book about toxic masculinity by Clementine Ford, first published in 2018, and with 2019 and 2020 editions retitled as Boys Will Be Boys: Power, Patriarchy and Toxic Masculinity. The book was well received by critics.

== Publication ==
Boys Will Be Boys: Power, Patriarchy and the Toxic Bonds of Mateship was first published in 2018 by Allen & Unwin Later editions in 2019 and 2020 by Oneworld Publications wrote the subtitle as Power, Patriarchy and Toxic Masculinity.

== Synopsis ==
Boys Will Be Boys presents several aspects of toxic masculinity typical of the upbringing of boys, arguing that patriarchal upbringing is damaging for adult men. Examples of gender coding in children about expected characteristics of boys and girls are presented in terms of statistics from films and television shows, with few girls and women being actors, writers and directors, particularly from her experience of childhood in the 1980s. According to Ford, an example of toxic masculinity that persists into male adulthood is men being shamed for expressing emotions, in behaviour that is seen as feminine. She argues that patriarchical culture requires males to "kill of the emotional parts of themselves".

The book covers traditional home roles of domestic housekeeping and roles at work. Ford describes what she sees as links between the gender conditioning of children and the long-term effects when the children become adults.

The book includes an argument that "toxic male spaces and behaviours" act to preserve male dominance.

Ford makes recommendations of how to change the ways that boys and girls are raised, which she believes may avoid or reduce toxic masculinity.

Personal reflections on the birth of Ford's son play a role in both the beginning and end of the book. The book's epilogue is a letter by Ford to her young son, describing "boyhood[] in which being sensitive, soft, kind, gentle, respectful, accountable, expressive, loving and nurturing are no longer framed as incompatible with being a man".

== Critical reception ==
Author Katherine Brabon described Boys Will Be Boys as presenting a "cogent and passionate argument" that the teaching of boys and men's roles is "broken". Criminology lecturer Carl Bradley strongly commended the book as "challengingly good".

Alex Casey describes the book as written with "withering wit", as an "incredibly thorough time capsule of the modern fight for gender equality", an as "some of the most essential and electric feminist reading of the year".

== See also ==
- Feminism in Australia
