= Toronto Fringe Festival =

Annual theatre festival held in Toronto, Canada

The Toronto Fringe Festival is an annual theatre festival, featuring un-juried plays by unknown or well-known artists, taking place in the theatres of Toronto, Ontario, Canada. Several productions originally mounted at the Fringe have later been remounted for larger audiences, including the Tony Award-winning musical The Drowsy Chaperone, and the sitcom Kim's Convenience.

== Features ==
The Toronto Fringe Festival started in 1989 and hosts over 150 productions every July.

It is well known for not having a jury to judge which plays will be presented. Instead it uses a lottery system which gives each play an equal chance. It depends mostly on volunteers, donors/sponsors, and government grants. One notable feature is the 24-hour playwriting contest in which contestants write a play in one day based on items selected by the Fringe and the winning play is performed on the last day of the festival.

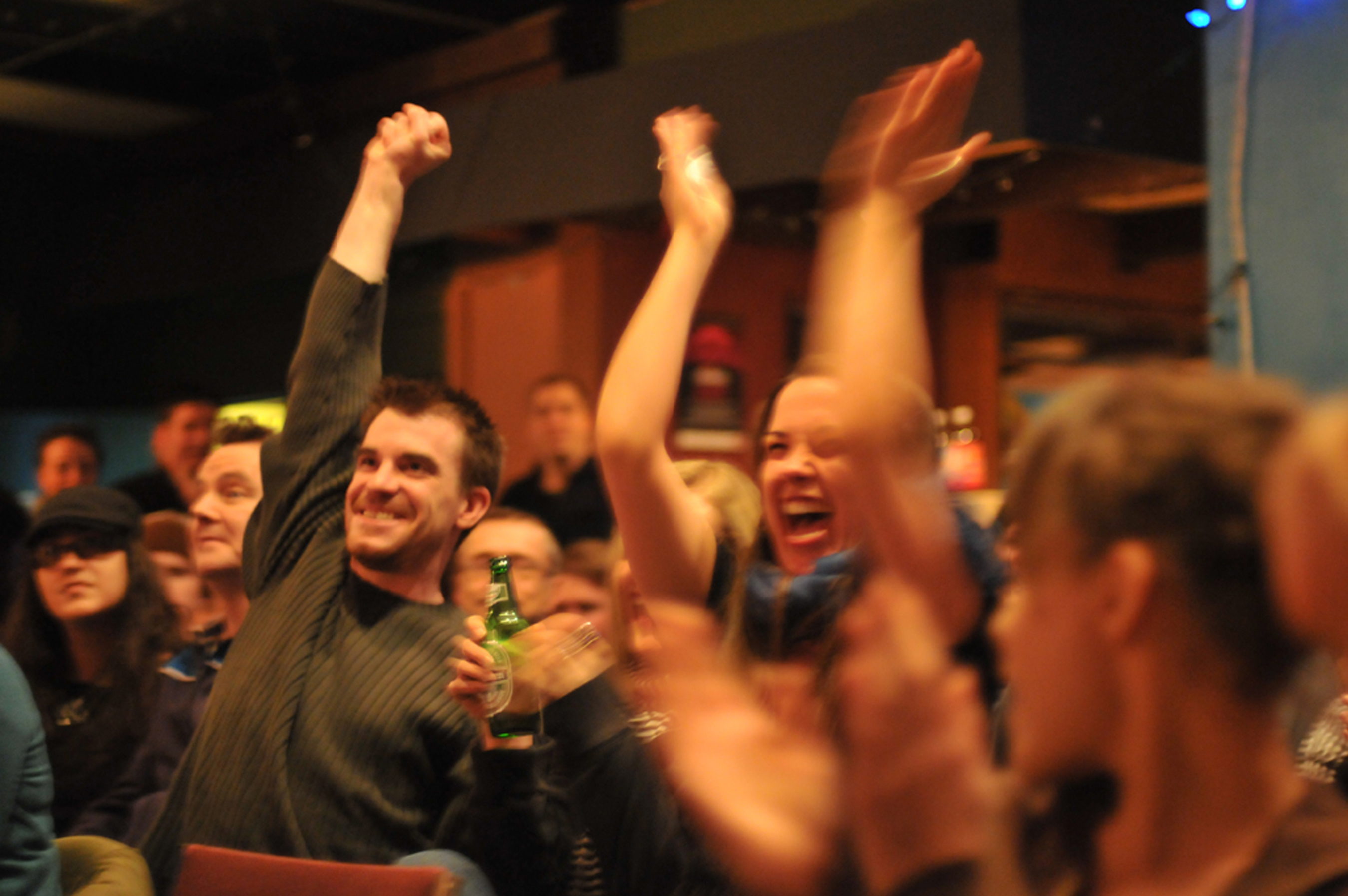
Winners at the 2009 Toronto Fringe Selection Lottery

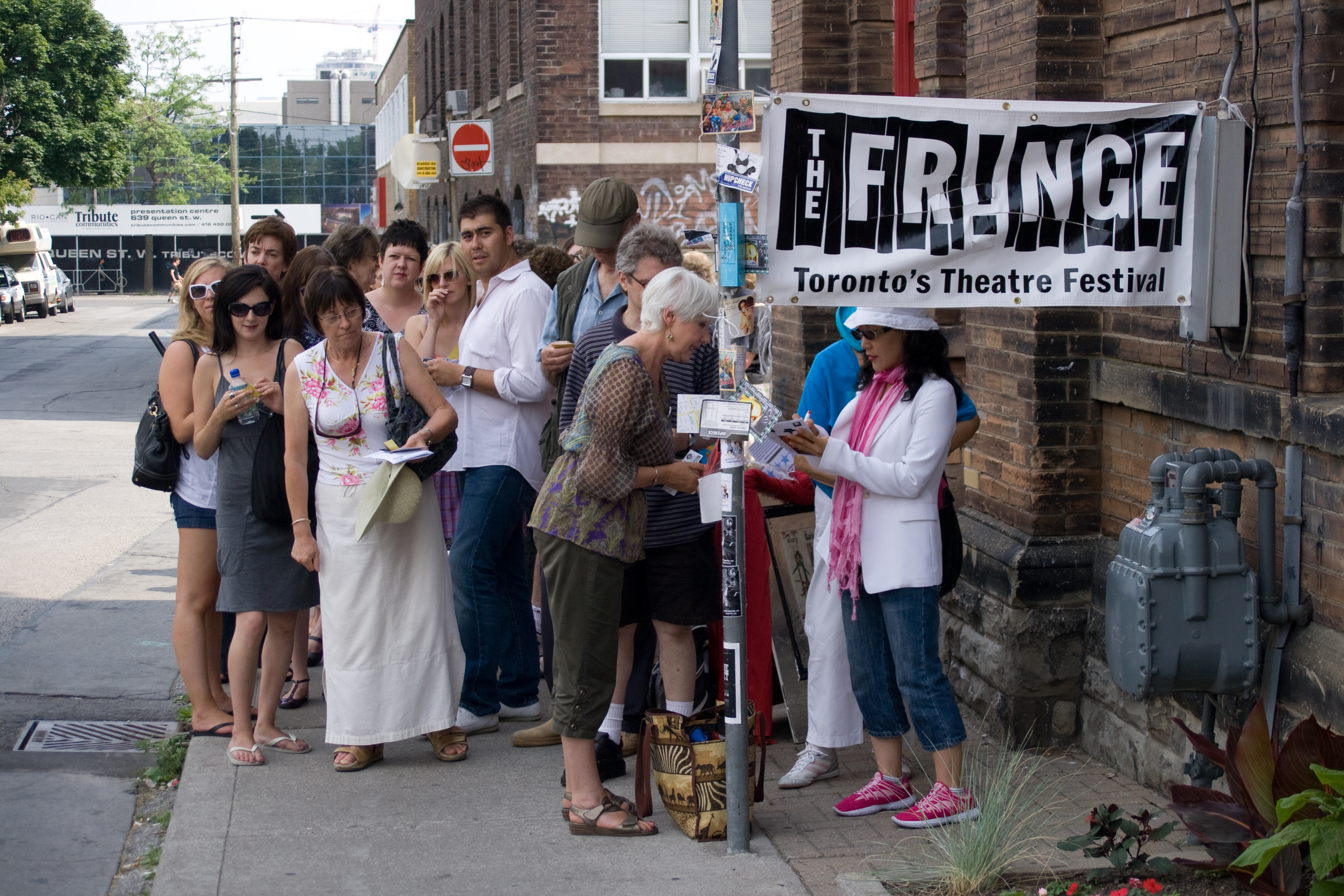
Audiences approach performer during Toronto Fringe at Theatre Passe Muraille

In 2008 "The Fringe of Toronto" launched a second festival called "The Next Stage Festival" (NSTF) which takes place annually in January. Unlike the summer festival, NSTF is juried and presents both new and remounted projects by "Fringe Artists". Also, unlike the summer Fringe Festival NSTF only showcases 8 productions.

NSTF was the first major step in the organization branching out to a year-round support organization that brings many opportunities to artists and arts-lovers. Since the launch of NSTF "The Toronto Fringe" has also introduced a number of artists outreach programs including The Fringe Evolution Fund to help independent producers remount their shows outside of the festival, and youth outreach programs including 10x10x10 which distributes 1,000 rush passes to priority youth in and around Toronto.

In 2010 the Toronto Fringe launched a new and expanded Fringe Club featuring free nightly entertainment, an expanded beer tent, a public stage called "Postscript Patio", art installations called Fringe-Pretty-Things, and food service provided by local restaurants. 2011 saw the grand opening of yet another expansion, this time a year-round fixture called "The Fringe Creation Lab".The Creation Lab is the new home of the Toronto Fringe and the indie arts community. The Lab consists of two studio spaces and the Toronto Fringe admin office, both housed on the 4th floor of the Centre for Social Innovation in the Annex. (Just steps away from Bathurst Station.) Both studios are available for anyone to rent at any time to do whatever they want. The spaces can be rented at various levels of subsidy, on a first-come, first-served basis. The studios are already a buzzing arts hub, bookable all hours of the day and night, where artists can focus on their craft and connect with their community without breaking the bank

Some notable productions include Trey Anthony's Da Kink in My Hair, winner of the Cultural Diversity Drama Competition, premiered as a one hour television pilot produced by VisionTV in 2004, and later was adapted into a half-hour weekly TV series in 2007-8 by the Global Television Network; My Own Private Oshawa, a one-man show by Jonathan Wilson which was later adapted into a film; and The Drowsy Chaperone, which went on to Broadway and several world tours. In 2009, My Mother's Lesbian Jewish-Wiccan Wedding was picked up by Mirvish Productions from the festival and opened only three months later at Toronto's Panasonic Theatre. Ins Choi's Kim's Convenience, winner of the 2011 Best New Play award, was remounted in 2012 by Soulpepper Theatre, and went on to become the successful TV series Kim's Convenience.
