= Cocktales (TV series) =

Canadian television series

Cocktales is a television show by The Comedy Network. This 10-episode, half-hour series gives an inside look at men’s private conversations. Each week, a rotating panel of men recounted sexual encounters, hilarious pranks and wild memories.

The series featured a broad group of men, including high school teachers, computer programmers, city workers and comedians.
