= Idle Worship/There's Something about Berries =

"Idle Worship/ There's Something about Berries"
- Iggy Arbuckle episode
- Episode no.: Season 1 Episode 4
- Written by: Robert Pincombe; Shelley Hoffman; Karen Moonah
- Production code: 104
- Original air date: July 5, 2007

Episode chronology
← Previous "The Beaver Who Would be King / I am Iggy, Hear Me Snore"	Next → "Yawny Come Lately / Petition Impossible"

"Idle Worship/There's Something about Berries" is the fourth episode of the animated children's series Iggy Arbuckle. It originally aired on July 5, 2007. The episode won writers Robert Pincombe, Shelley Hoffman, and Karen Moonah the 2008 Gemini award for Best Writing in a Children's or Youth Program or Series.

== Plot ==
=== Idle Worship ===
Iggy is excitedly waiting with a fatigued Jiggers in the center of Mooseknuckle. He tells Jiggers that Manly Boarman, a famous Australian explorer whom he has idolized since childhood, is coming to explore the Kookamunga, and that Iggy has agreed to be his guide. When Manly arrives, he is immediately swarmed by bees from the press, who are anxious to photograph him at all opportunities. When he lands after parachuting from his plane, he greets Iggy and Jiggers, who then proceed to lead him around the park. However, Boarman has not been exploring lately; being more caught up in his celebrityhood and public image. As a result, he has lost touch with nature, and repeatedly falls into scrapes with the wildlife and the landmarks. After narrowly escaping Mount Kaboom while hang-gliding with Iggy, Manly deals with the reporters once again, while Jiggers points out Manly's problems to Iggy. Iggy then decides to help Manly get back in touch with nature by taking him to Mango Tango Beach, a small beach where a flock of violent, stampeding flamingoes lives. When there, Manly's mother calls him on his cellphone, which alarms the flamingoes, who then proceed to run him down. As they are heading in Mooseknuckle's direction, Iggy and Jiggers make a fence all around their path, leading the flamingoes back to the beach. At the end of Manly Boarman's expedition, he tells them that he has been reinspired to get back to nature, and forget about publicity.

=== There's Something about Berries ===
Iggy, Jiggers, Zoop and Spiff are at Zoop's store, playing a game called "Tippy Canoe", in which they place various sweets and candies on a miniature boat, balanced on a pedestal. Kira comes in, and tells them that her business running the tourist kiosk has been going very slowly lately. She then asks if she can join in the game, but when Jiggers pulls a chair over for her, the chair knocks into the table, causing the boat to tip over, and the game to end. At that moment, Catfish Stu enters, putting up an advertisement in the window for a chef. Zoop offers, but he declines, knocking off her cooking until she kicks him out. Later, Iggy and Jiggers are walking home; Jiggers worrying that Kira feels left out from the rest of the gang, when a bluebird comes and eats at his blueberry muffin. Iggy finds it strange, as the bluebirds are supposed to eat juniper berries. The two head to Rattler's Pass, then canyon in which the juniper bushes grow, and find that they've been replaced with rubber lookalikes. Remembering that juniper berries are a gourmet ingredient in cooking, and remembering Catfish Stu's taste for gourmet food, they immediately become suspicious, and investigate. At Stu's Adventure Camp, they find a new building has been set up, with a skylight; a place likely to serve as a greenhouse. Stu, however, has hired a flock of geese to serve as guards. After recruiting everyone and giving them each an assignment (Spiff must distract the geese with his gossip, Zoop turns off the security alarm, Kira makes sandwiches for everyone, Iggy and Jiggers retrieve the bushes) they set off. When Iggy and Jiggers are inside, they find that Stu has placed poison ivy around the bushes. They try various ways to get the bushes without touching the ivy, but when their last attempt backfires, the alarm goes off unexpectedly. The next day Stu admonishes them and returns to his house, with his new chef. Everyone is downhearted that the bluebirds will have to go hungry, until Kira shows up with the bushes. She then reveals that she's taken up a nighttime job as a chef, working for Stu. Meanwhile, when Stu and the ferrets try to take back the bushes, the birds crowd around them and chase them down.

== References to culture ==
- The title of the first story, "Idle Worship", references the term "Idol worship", while the title of the second story, "There's Something about Berries" references the title of the movie There's Something about Mary.
- When the bluebirds gather around and look ominously at Catfish Stu, Robear and Robert, the scene is reminiscent of the Alfred Hitchcock movie The Birds.
