= Toony Tube =

Animated television series

- Genre: Comedy
- Created by: Santiago Castillo Linares; Aitor Villadóniga
- Country of origin: Spain
- Original language: Spanish
- No. of seasons: 2
- No. of episodes: approx. 80

Production
- Running time: 3 minutes
- Production company: Cartoon Network

Original release
- Release: 21 July 2018

Toony Tube is a Spanish television series created for Cartoon Network by Santiago Castillo Linares and Aitor Villadóniga. Toony Tube is presented by a puppet that resembles a young boy with blond hair with thick black rimmed glasses which wears a gaming headset and it is just like a typical Let's Player on YouTube.

The show premiered originally in Spain on Boing on July 21, 2018. An English version of the show premiered in August 2018 on Cartoon Network UK, starring Andy Davies, a former Cartoon Network UK announcer from 15 December 2013 to 24 July 2016, as the voice of Toony.

== Episodes ==
The episodes are listed in order of production.

=== Season 1 (2018–19) ===
No. overall	No. in season	Title	Directed by	Written by	Storyboard by	Original release date
1	1	"Banana Joe's Fails"	Santiago Castillo Linares	Tom Leduc	Peter Cerutti	July 21, 2018 (ES); August 2018 (UK)
2	2	"Regular Show's Fails"	Peter Cerutti	Guy Moon	Genni Selby	July 28, 2018 (ES); 16 September 2018 (UK)
3	3	"Food Fusion"	J.G. Orrantia	J.G. Quintel	Rick Gitelson	August 4, 2018 (ES); 22 September 2018 (UK)
4	4	"Food Fusion"	David Silverman	Rick Gitelson	Paul Bouchard	August 11, 2018 (ES); 23 September 2018 (UK)
5	5	"Food Fusion 2"	Al Jean	Sheila Dinsmore	Ted Bastien	August 18, 2018 (ES); 29 September 2018 (UK)
6	6	"Back to School! (not be confused with Back 2 School!)"	Charles E. Bastien	Scott Gray	Alex Szewczuk	August 25, 2018 (ES); 30 September 2018 (UK)
7	7	"What's Love?"	Charles E. Bastien	Rick Gitelson	Genni Selby	September 1, 2018 (ES); 6 October 2018 (UK)
8	8	"The Fans' Quizz"	Unknown	Sharon Schatz Rosenthal	Ted Bastien	September 8, 2018 (ES); 7 October 2018 (UK)
9	9	"Toony Talent Toony Talent 2: Do Not Survive Fails"	Charles E. Bastien	Sheila Dinsmore	Paul Bouchard	September 15, 2018 (ES); 13 October 2018 (UK)
