= Yawny Come Lately / Petition Impossible =

- Iggy Arbuckle episode
- Episode no.: Season 1 Episode 5
- Directed by: Adam De Vries; Nathan Little
- Written by: Terry Saltsman (Yawny Come Lately); Kenn Scott (Petition Impossible)
- Production code: 105
- Original air date: July 6, 2007

Guest appearances
- Katie Bergin as Quilpie

Episode chronology
← Previous "Idle Worship/There's Something about Berries"	Next → "Paradise Found/Luck Before You Leap"

"Yawny Come Lately / Petition Impossible" is the fifth episode of season one of the animated children's series Iggy Arbuckle. It originally aired on July 6, 2007. The second half of the episode was selected as one of the children's programming finalists in the 2008 Canadian Screenwriting Awards, and proved the winner in the Preschool/Children's category.

== Plot ==
=== Yawny Come Lately ===
The characters are preparing to celebrate Yawny Yumpalot Day, a day which Iggy explains to Kira is to honour the great spirit Yawny Yumpalot, who supposedly created the entire Kookamunga Park. He also tells her that the Great Bamzeani used to be three fur traders who were turned into a totem pole by Yawny after they captured him. Iggy says that in honour of Yawny's prankster nature, everyone plays practical jokes on each other, and then everyone starts commenting on what an easy "yumping" target Jiggers is. Later, while everyone is hearing Iggy's announcement on stage, a huge spirit wearing his underwear on the outside appears behind him, saying that he feels insulted by the way they "honour" him. Yawny then says he will turn them all into a totem pole if they don't pay homage to him in a respectful way. Terrified, Iggy and the others try to find impractical jokes to use, but when they present their ideas to Yawny, he admonishes them, and leaves them with ten more minutes to think something up. Jiggers points out that he keeps mentioning a totem pole, and that this might mean something. Iggy agrees,"Of all the things Yawny is supposed to have created, the Great Bamzeani is the one we know for sure!", and leaves Jiggers to direct the whole town as they stand on top of each other like a totem pole. He tells them to wear their underwear on the outside, to be safe. As they balance on top of each other, Jiggers tells them to repeat what he says, and says the traditional phrase said when yumping someone else: "You've been yumped!" He then reveals his joke to everyone else, and Iggy gives him a wedgie in response.

=== Petition Impossible ===
Iggy and Jiggers return home from protecting the river during the rainy season, to find that amongst their mail from the past week is a letter that, due to a contract from the 1940s, there will be a highway built through the middle of Kookamunga National Park. They notice the petition available to contest this construction, and head to Mooseknuckle to collect signatures. When there, they explain the situation, and even Catfish Stu makes it a point to force everyone into signing when he finds out that the highway will not allow anyone to stop and book in at his Adventure Camp. However, the petition, which needs 200 signatures, is missing most of the requirements, so Iggy and Jiggers head all over the park gathering signatures from the residents and tourists; finally resorting to wild yaks' hoof prints when nothing else is available. They are then left with just one more signature, and Iggy suggests going to Spelvin, the hermit crab, for help. However, Spelvin says he'll need them to renovate his domain if he's to even consider it; and when they are done, he decides not to. Iggy realizes that he still hadn't signed, and does so; upon which Jiggers tyrades about how Spelvin also took his bottle-cap collection. Iggy cuts him off and tells him they must hurry back to give the full petition to Quilpie, the courier. While Zoop tries to delay the punctual kangaroo back at Mooseknuckle, Iggy and Jiggers narrowly escape a hungry panther, but make it back to Mooseknuckle by five o'clock, to deliver the petition. The episode ends with Zoop telling them that it's Tuesday, and since the petition was due Wednesday, Jiggers finishes his tantrum about losing his bottle-cap collection for nothing.

== References to culture ==
- The title of the segment "Yawny Come Lately" is a reference to "Johnny Come Lately", while "Petition Impossible" is a reference to the Mission Impossible series.
- The fictional "Yawny Yump-a-lot Day" has many similarities to April Fool's Day, including the tradition of participants playing practical jokes on each other. The traditional line said after a prank is pulled "You've been yumped!" also draws parallels to the phrase "April Fool!".
