= Todd Thicke =

Canadian television writer and producer

- Born: Ontario, Canada
- Occupations: Television producer; writer
- Known for: Executive producer and head writer of America's Funniest Home Videos
- Children: 2
- Relatives: Alan Thicke (brother); Robin Thicke (nephew)

Todd Thicke is a Canadian television writer and producer most known for his work as the executive producer and head writer of America's Funniest Home Videos since the show's premiere in 1989.

== Biography ==
Before moving to Los Angeles from Toronto in 1982, Thicke studied English literature at the University of Western Ontario in London and at York University in Toronto. He currently resides in Los Angeles with his wife and two children. He is the younger brother of television actor Alan Thicke, and uncle to singer/songwriter Robin Thicke and actors Brennan Thicke and Carter Thicke.

== Television career ==
Over the course of AFV’s 26-year-long run, Thicke has served in many positions; most notably as the head writer and executive producer, as well as writer, co-producer, and co-executive producer. He is credited with having written the pilot script, and has worked with many stars over the years including but not limited to: Bob Saget, Tom Bergeron, Anthony Anderson, Tracee Ellis Ross, Cristela Alonso, David Foster, Alan Thicke, Billy Ray Cyrus, Howie Mandel, Jerry Seinfeld, Frank Zappa, Jim Carrey, Muhammad Ali, and Anne Murray.

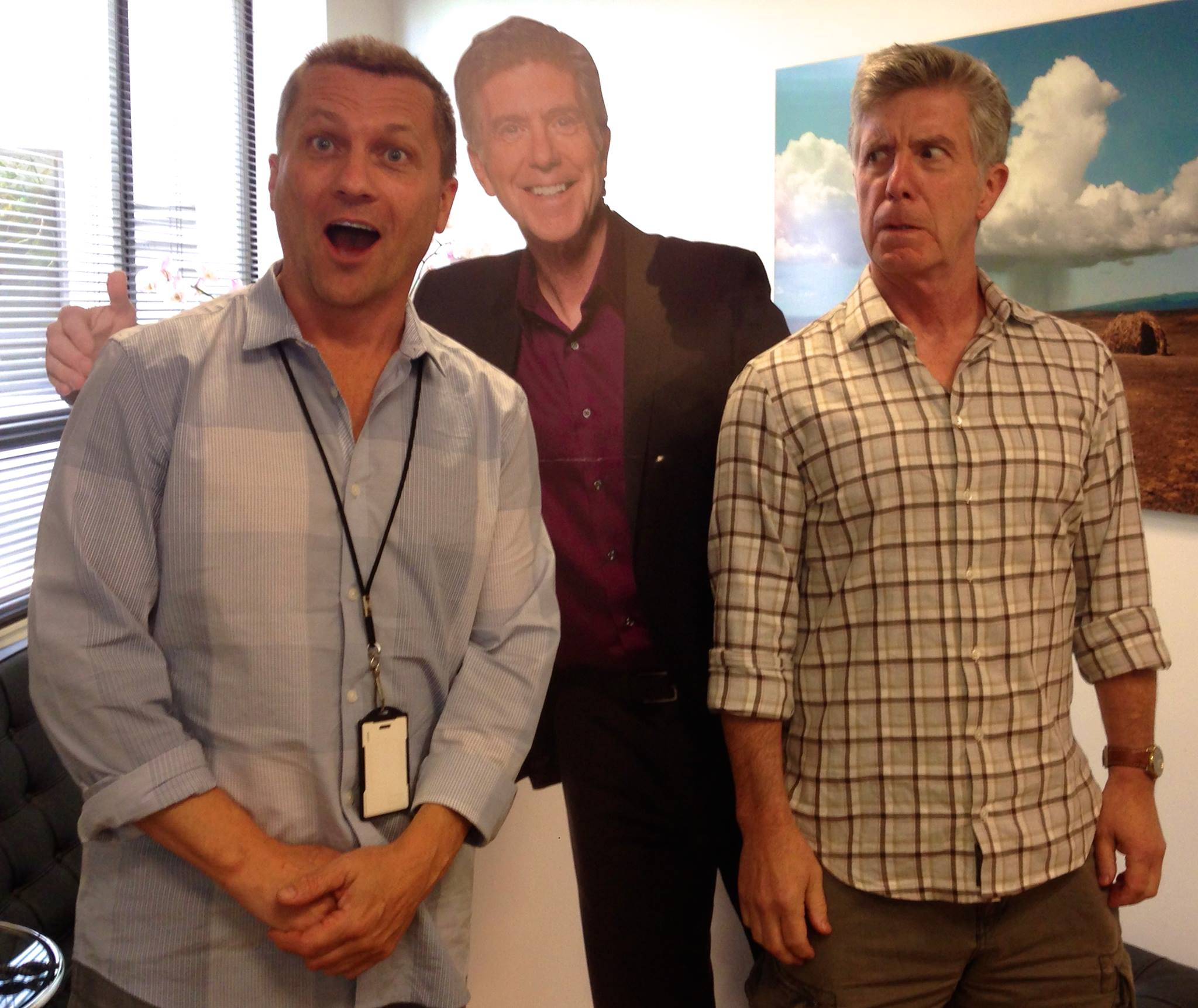
Thicke and Tom Bergeron at the AFV Headquarters

Thicke has written and produced programming for ABC, Disney, CBC, CTV, FOX, Hallmark, and Lifetime.

Throughout his career, Thicke has written and produced many programs including The Wil Shriner Show, Animal Crack-Ups, Rick Dees Into the Night, Growing Pains, Candid Camera, John Callahan’s Quads, Pelswick, and 65 episodes for the popular children's cartoon Dennis the Menace. In addition to writing, he also served as the story editor for 26 episodes of John Callahan’s Quads.

Thicke has also produced many comedy/reality shows in the U.S. and Canada, including The NHL Awards, Anne Murray Christmas, The Alan Thicke Show, The World Magic Awards, The I Do Diaries, and National Lampoon’s Quest for Comedy.

Bell Media

He is also credited with writing numerous television theme songs, including the music packages for the 1986-1987 revival of Split Second and the 1984–1986 run of Let's Make a Deal.

Thicke founded his production company Team Thicke in late 2015. Since then, he has been developing programming for networks and studios on both sides of the Canadian/American border.

In 2017, Team Thicke entered into deals with Bell Media, Canada's largest private broadcaster, and NBC Universal's Wilshire Studios. Including, Thicke's collaboration with Darrell Vickers, known for his work on "The Tonight Show," to create "You're the Boss" for Wilshire Studios.

In 2018, Thicke and Vickers created and produced "Feast of a Lifetime" for Bell Media. Starring celebrity chef Lynn Crawford (Pitchin' In) everyday heroes were surprised with a spectacular feast when the entire community showed up to celebrate their accomplishments.

In addition to working with MGM, Thicke also worked with Prospero Pictures on "World's Funniest Families", where precocious kids weighed in on hot button topics of the day and offered surprising words of wisdom. Thicke is also Executive Consultant on "This Week Live", Canada's Late Night Show, streaming nationally across the country.

In 2024, Thicke joined forces with producer and playwright Richard Klagsbrun (An Unsafe Space) on Klagsbrun's musical extravaganza, This Strange Paradise that premiered at the El Mocambo in Toronto.

== Awards and nominations ==
=== Nominations ===
- Daytime Emmy for Special Classification of Outstanding Individual Achievement – writers for The Wil Shriner Show
- Gemini Award for Best Writing in a Comedy or Variety Program or Series for The NHL Awards

=== Further recognition ===
Thicke has been interviewed by many widely known media sources such as Entertainment Weekly (2006), Variety (2007), Entertainment Tonight (2008), and the Toronto Sun (2017). He has also been featured in articles written for ADWEEK, Time Magazine and thestar.com. Most recently, Thicke has been featured in "A Taste of the Kawarthas."

In 2009, Thicke's original pilot script for America's Funniest Home Videos was added to the Smithsonian’s National Museum of American History collection. It is now permanently displayed in Washington.

In May 2016, Thicke was a guest lecturer at U.C. Davis, where he and several other panelists gave a talk on comedy to Davis theatre students. In July 2016, Thicke was featured in an article and accompanying video about Tom Bergeron on CinemaBlend.com.

Thicke has served three terms on the Steering Committee for the Caucus of Producers, Writers, and Directors and has spoken at numerous industry panels, including The Paley Center, The TV Academy, and NATPE. In addition, he serves on the Advisory Council of the School for Advanced Studies of Arts and Humanities at the University of Western Ontario in London, the Advisory Committee of George Brown College Screenwriting and Narrative Design Program, the Youth Advisory Board for the P.A.R.T.I Program and the Mentorship Program for the Hollywood Radio and TV Society.
