= The Trouble with Larry =

American sitcom television series

- Genre: Sitcom
- Created by: Andrew Nicholls; Darrell Vickers
- Starring: Bronson Pinchot; Courteney Cox; Alex McKenna; Perry King; Shanna Reed
- Composer: Stephen Graziano
- Country of origin: United States
- Original language: English
- No. of seasons: 1
- No. of episodes: 7 (4 Unaired)

Production
- Producers: Jim Herzfeld; Jan Siegleman
- Camera setup: Multi-camera
- Running time: 30 minutes
- Production companies: Highest Common Denominator Productions; Meleager Productions; Warner Bros. Television

Original release
- Network: CBS
- Release: August 25 – September 8, 1993

The Trouble with Larry is an American sitcom television series that aired from August 25, 1993 to September 8, 1993 on CBS. It starred Bronson Pinchot as Larry Burton, a man returning home to Syracuse after being presumed dead for many years. CBS gave the series an early start by premiering it in late August, three weeks after Pinchot's previous series, Perfect Strangers, finished its run on ABC. However, after poor reviews and three weeks of bad ratings, the series was canceled before the official TV season it was to have been a part of had even begun.

== Premise ==
Larry returns home a decade after he was dragged off by baboons on his honeymoon. His wife, Sally, has now married another man and has a nine-year-old daughter. Larry falls in love with his former sister-in-law, Gabriella, who hates him.

== Cast ==
- Bronson Pinchot as Larry Burton
- Courteney Cox as Gabriella Easden
- Alex McKenna as Lindsay Flatt
- Perry King as Boyd Flatt
- Shanna Reed as Sally Easden

== Episodes ==
No.	Title	Directed by	Written by	Original release date	Prod. code	Viewers (millions)
1	"The Homecoming"	Joel Zwick	Andrew Nicholls and Darrell Vickers	August 25, 1993	455651	9.4
Larry returns after being presumed dead for ten years and tries to resume his role as head of the family.
2	"The Vigilantes"	Robert Berlinger	Tom Finnigan	September 1, 1993	455653	9.9
Lindsay's bike is stolen and Larry hits the streets trying to find the bike.
3	"My Science Fair Lady"	John Fortenberry	Lisa Rosenthal	September 8, 1993	455654	9.1
Larry is exposed when he tries to be a robot for Lindsay's science project, but his knowledge of the jungle helps expose the science fair winner as another fake.
4	"The Angel of Death and Taxes"	Linda Day	Steve Billnitzer	Unaired	455656	N/A
5	"Witless for the Prosecution"	David Trainer	Art Everett	Unaired	455652	N/A
6	"Rhinestone Cowboy"	Mark Linn-Baker	Julie Thacker	Unaired	455655	N/A
Sally kisses Larry and thinks she's about to fall in love with him again.
7	"Piñata Full of Bones"	Robert Berlinger	Charlie Kaufman	Unaired	455657	N/A

== Reception ==
Reviews for The Trouble with Larry were generally unfavorable, occasionally bordering on hostile. Ken Tucker of Entertainment Weekly gave the show a grade of D+ and called the show "not just not-funny, but actively depressing". Hal Boedeker, writing for the Knight-Ridder newspaper chain, opined that "the moronic sitcom was beyond bad, a disaster that raises doubts about the judgement of CBS executives." David Zurawik of the Baltimore Sun called the show juvenile, and wondered "How did this sitcom (using the word in its most expansive sense) ever make it on the CBS fall schedule?" Frazier Moore of The Seattle Post-Intelligencer wrote that "The Trouble with Larry is a sitcom so feeble yet brazen in its humormongering that it nearly takes the viewer's breath away." The Orlando Sentinel's Greg Dawson praised the show's "first-rate" cast, but attacked the pilot's "dead-in-the-water writing" and "nonstop witlesscisms", and called the finished product "sophomoric dreck ... which tests the self-control of anyone with an IQ over 50 and a sledgehammer or handgun in the house." David Hiltbrand of People, in a review that ran shortly after the show's cancellation, gave the series a C grade. Hiltbrand had mild praise for the "anarchic" pilot, characterizing the humor as "flip" and "batty", but wrote that subsequent episodes of The Trouble With Larry were mired in "dreary domesticity".

The show ran three episodes before being cancelled following the September 8 broadcast. Eleven days later, another series co-created by Andrew Nicholls and Darrell Vickers premiered: It Had to Be You, starring Faye Dunaway and Robert Urich. It lasted four episodes, giving Nicholls and Vickers the unusual distinction of overseeing two of the earliest-to-be-cancelled new shows of the same TV season.
