= Kenn Scott (screenwriter) =

Canadian television writer and university professor

- Occupations: Television writer; Magazine columnist; University professor
- Years active: 1997–present

Kenn Scott is a Toronto-based screenwriter noted for his work in children's programming and animation. Included amongst the many shows he has written for are Ned's Newt, Iggy Arbuckle, Captain Flamingo, Rescue Heroes, Seven Little Monsters, Pelswick, Quads!, Delilah and Julius, Dino Dan and Doki. His column "A Writer's Life" appears regularly in the magazine Canadian Screenwriter. He is also the co-author of the university textbook On Our Wavelength: Broadcasting History from a Canadian Perspective, and the video game Uh-Oh Flamingo!

Scott won a special animation award from the Writers Guild of Canada for his work on Ned's Newt, as well as a 2008 Canadian Screenwriting Award in the Children & Preschool category for an episode of Iggy Arbuckle.

In addition to his continuing work as a screenwriter, Scott has been teaching screenwriting and media history at Ryerson University (now Toronto Metropolitan University) in Toronto since 1997. He also teaches at the University of Toronto, and as of 2021, he is a professor in the Children's Media program at Toronto's Centennial College.
