= It Had to Be You (TV series) =

- Genre: Sitcom
- Created by: Andrew Nicholls; Darrell Vickers; John Steven Owen
- Starring: Faye Dunaway; Robert Urich; Justin Whalin; Will Estes; Justin Jon Ross; Robin Bartlett
- Music by: Stephen James Taylor
- Country of origin: United States
- Original language: English
- No. of seasons: 1
- No. of episodes: 9 (5 unaired)

Production
- Camera setup: Multi-camera
- Production companies: Highest Common Denominator Productions; Warner Bros. Television

Original release
- Network: CBS
- Release: September 19 – October 15, 1993

It Had to Be You is an American sitcom starring Faye Dunaway and Robert Urich. It premiered on CBS on September 19, 1993, and last aired on October 15, 1993, before being pulled from the air and put on hiatus. The series centered on Dunaway's character, Laura, a Network-like book publisher, who falls for blue-collar carpenter Mitch, a single father of three boys (played by Urich) who she hired to build a bookshelf in her Boston office.

== Cast ==
- Faye Dunaway as Laura Scofield
- Robert Urich as Mitch Quinn
- Justin Whalin as David Quinn, Mitch's first son
- Will Estes as Christopher Quinn, Mitch's second son
- Justin Jon Ross as Sebastian Quinn, Mitch's third son
- Robin Bartlett as Eve Parkin

== Production ==
The series was produced by Warner Bros. Television. The theme song was the 1924 hit "It Had to Be You" written by Isham Jones, with music by Stephen James Taylor. Four episodes were aired before the show was put on hiatus.

After taping nine episodes, Faye Dunaway was pulled from the series, and a new pilot was ordered with the focus being on Robert Urich's character coping with life as a single father. Robin Bartlett, who had played an assistant to Dunaway's character, would also continue in the series, being moved up from supporting character to co-lead. However, her character would not be a romantic partner for Urich. Dunaway told Army Archerd, “If the series comes back without me, I may even watch it. I still adore Bob Urich.” Although a new pilot was shot, the revised version of the series never aired.

The show premiered eleven days after the cancellation of The Trouble with Larry, another series co-created by Andrew Nicholls and Darrell Vickers (and which lasted only three episodes). When It Had To Be You was cancelled after four episodes, it gave Nicholls and Vickers the unusual distinction of overseeing two of the earliest-to-be-cancelled new shows of the same American television season.

== Episodes ==
No.	Title	Directed by	Written by	Original release date	Prod. code
1	"Pilot"	David Steinberg	Story by : John Steven Owen; Teleplay by : John Steven Owen and Andrew Nicholls & Darrell Vickers	September 19, 1993	475071
Laura is a high-powered book publisher who has put her personal life on hold for professional success. But when sparks fly with Mitch, the hunky carpenter she hires to build a bookshelf in her office, she realizes it may be time for a change.
2	"Long Date's Journey Into Night"	David Steinberg	Jenny Bicks	September 24, 1993	455605
Mitch asks Laura out on their first date, which she has her assistant cancel after a million-dollar mistake at work. Mitch doesn't get the message and gets angry for being stood up, so he shows up at Laura's house to confront her.
3	"Let's Spend Termite Together"	David Steinberg	Rick Cunningham	October 1, 1993	455602
Mitch's home is being fumigated for termites and his hotel reservations fall through. So Laura invites him and his three kids to stay at her impeccably decorated apartment.
4	"All About Dave"	David Steinberg	Lindsay Harrison	October 15, 1993	455604
When Mitch's son David loses his job as a carwash mascot, Laura hires him as the office errand boy and refuses to see that he is completely unqualified and failing miserably.
5	"Truth or Dare"	David Steinberg	Eugenie Ross-Leming & Brad Buckner	Unaired	455601
Mitch's son Chris (Will Estes) turns to Laura when he is caught shoplifting. Keeping it a secret from Mitch becomes too much for Laura, so she insists Chris confess. Afterwards, she agrees to go with Chris to return the item back to the store manager (Terry Sweeney) and apologize. But at the scene of the crime, Chris ditches Laura, leaving her holding the stolen merchandise, which lands her in the slammer.
6	"London Calling"	David Steinberg	Jenny Bicks	Unaired	455603
Laura's old flame (Ian Ogilvy) offers her the job of her dreams in London, but all she wants is Mitch to ask her to stay in Boston with him.
7	"Shrink Resistant"	David Steinberg	Art Everett	Unaired	455606
Mitch gives Laura a key to his home and is hurt when she's hesitant to reciprocate. Then he freaks out when he realizes the psychiatrist (Richard Libertini) whose home he is working on is Laura's personal shrink, and he may know more about Mitch's relationship than Mitch does.
8	"Wheel of Laura"	David Steinberg	Marianne Meyer	Unaired	455607
Laura is making an effort to connect with Mitch's son Sebastian, but neighborhood mom Debbie Hayes (Shelley Fabares) seems hellbent on blocking her at every turn.
9	"Just Hold"	David Steinberg	Bernie Keating	Unaired	455608
After 10 days apart, Mitch and Laura make plans for a romantic evening together with no kids, phones or television. But their time alone is interrupted when Albert (Leslie Jordan), a depressed author suffering with writer's block, shows up at Laura's place hoping to finish his long-overdue novel.

== Reception ==
Although preview audience reactions were positive, the series received mostly negative critical reception. Ken Tucker of Entertainment Weekly rated the series a C+ and called it "one of the season's vaguest, most ambivalent new sitcoms". Tucker described the casting of "odd-couple lovers" Urich and Dunaway as "almost perversely capricious". Tony Scott, reviewing the pilot in Variety, criticized the "thin script" and "lumpy badinage". Noting that the show would premiere with a special "preview glimpse" in the slot after 60 Minutes, Scott concluded that "a glimpse should be enough". David Hiltbrand of People magazine gave It Had to Be You a grade of C−. He praised supporting actor Bartlett's performance, but felt Dunaway "seems quite uncomfortable doing comedy", and found the way her character was written to be "repulsive". Overall, Hiltbrand characterized the show as "brittle, artificial, tiresome and devoid of romantic chemistry."

CBS put It Had to Be You on "permanent hiatus" after four episodes had aired.
