= Will and Dewitt =

2007 Canadian TV series

- Genre: Adventure; Comedy; Musical
- Created by: Andrew Nicholls and Darrell Vickers
- Directed by: Paul Riley
- Voices of: Connor Price; Richard Ian Cox; Billy Rosemberg; Richard Binsley
- Music by: Marvin Dolgay
- Countries of origin: United States; Canada
- Original language: English
- No. of seasons: 1
- No. of episodes: 26 (52 segments)

Production
- Executive producers: Michael Hirsh; Toper Taylor; Pamela Slavin; Andrew Nicholls; Darrell Vickers
- Producer: Susie Grondin
- Running time: 22–24 minutes
- Production companies: Procter & Gamble; YTV; Cookie Jar Entertainment; Two Presidents Productions

Original release
- Network: YTV
- Release: September 22, 2007 – May 3, 2008

Will and Dewitt is an American-Canadian preschool children's animated musical television series starring a frog named Dewitt, and a human boy named Will as the main characters. It is produced by Cookie Jar Entertainment (now known as "WildBrain") and Two Presidents Productions. The series premiered on September 22, 2007, on Kids' WB. The series finale aired on May 3, 2008.

The show was a merchandise-driven tie-in to Procter & Gamble's Kandoo product.

== Plot ==
The show focuses on a frog named Dewitt who motivates his human friend Will to accomplish difficult tasks.

== Characters ==
=== Main ===
- Will (voiced by Connor Price) is a 6-year-old fun-loving, shy, and positive boy. He has red hair and freckles, an older brother named Fred, a younger sister named Kate. He also has a pet frog named Dewitt.
- Dewitt (voiced by Richard Ian Cox) is an anthropomorphic frog who can shift into any shape or size, normally as a visual aid to a joke he just made. He is also a skilled impersonator. In each episode, he gives Will the support and motivation to complete difficult tasks. Dewitt first appeared and continues to appear on the packaging of Procter & Gamble's Kandoo personal care products. The frog pre-dated the TV show and was named Dewitt upon its creation.

=== Supporting ===
- Fred (voiced by Billy Rosemberg) is Will's 10-year-old brother who thinks he's better than him.
- Kate (voiced by Nissae Isen) is Will's 4-year-old younger sister who likes animals. She can get in the way of Will's challenges.
- Sandra is Will's female friend and occasional rival, Sandra is a next-door neighbour of Will and Sam.
- Mom (voiced by Katie Griffin) and Dad (voiced by Richard Binsley) are Will, Kate, and Fred's parents are always nearby and ready to lend a hand if their children need it. They are fun, understanding and supportive.
- Sam (voiced by London Angelis) is Will's Latin-Canadian best friend, whose full name is "Samuel", and who is also a fan of Frogboy. He's also good at telling jokes.
- The Forest Animals – Those characters help Will and Dewitt with their challenges by singing about them. Wince the yellow raccoon is voiced by Richard Binsley, Zipper the brown mouse is voiced by Jen Gould Shelley the turtle is voiced by Linda Ballantyne, and coloured koi fish Karen is voiced by Annick Obonsawin.

== Episodes ==
All episodes are directed by Paul Riley.

No.	Title	Written by	Storyboard by	Original release date	Prod. code	K6–11 rating/share
1	"Things That Go Flump in the Night"	Andrew Nicholls and Darrell Vickers	Ron Migliore	September 22, 2007	101	0.4/3
1	"My New Boots"	Andrew Nicholls and Darrell Vickers	John Flagg	September 22, 2007	101	0.4/3
2	"Double Frog Dare"	Andrew Nicholls and Darrell Vickers	John Williamson	September 29, 2007	102	0.4/4
2	"Wreckfast in Bed"	Andrew Nicholls and Darrell Vickers	Geri Bertolo	September 29, 2007	102	0.4/4
3	"Will and Grass"	Andrew Nicholls and Darrell Vickers	Troy Sullivan	October 6, 2007	103	0.5/3
3	"Stain Stain Go Away"	Andrew Nicholls and Darrell Vickers	Todd Sullivan	October 6, 2007	103	0.5/3
4	"Sibling Revelry"	Andrew Nicholls and Darrell Vickers	Mario Cabrera	October 13, 2007	104	0.3/4
4	"Messy Beaucoup"	Andrew Nicholls and Darrell Vickers	Samuel To	October 13, 2007	104	0.3/4
5	"My Frog Lips are Sealed"	Shaun Graham	Steve Le Couilliard	November 3, 2007	105	0.5/6
5	"Stage Coached"	Steven Sullivan	John Flagg	November 3, 2007	105	0.5/6
6	"Trading Pluses"	Daniel Bryan Franklin	Ron Migliore	November 10, 2007	106	0.4/3
6	"I Thank Therefore I Am"	Andrew Nicholls and Darrell Vickers	Geri Bertolo	November 10, 2007	106	0.4/3
7	"Just Venting"	Brad Birch	Frank Ramirez	November 17, 2007	107	N/A
7	"Night of the Living Teenager"	Brad Birch	Paul Schibili	November 17, 2007	107	N/A
8	"An Olden Pond"	Andrew Nicholls and Darrell Vickers	Troy Sullivan	November 24, 2007	108	N/A
8	"Total Eclipse of the Frog"	Andrew Nicholls and Darrell Vickers	Samuel To	November 24, 2007	108	N/A
9	"The Long March"	Dennise Fordham	Mario Cabrera	December 1, 2007	109	0.6/5
9	"Small Potatoes"	Andrew Nicholls and Darrell Vickers	Todd Sullivan	December 1, 2007	109	0.6/5
10	"No Cause for Alarm"	Edgar Lyall	Dave Pemberton	December 8, 2007	111	0.5/5
10	"Where There's a Will, There's a Wedding"	Mary Colin Chisolm and Christian Murray	John Flagg	December 8, 2007	111	0.5/5
11	"Fair Factor"	Terry Saltsman	Geri Bertolo	December 15, 2007	110	0.4/4
11	"Draw!"	Jamie Waese	Trevor Hierons	December 15, 2007	110	0.4/4
12	"The Joke's on Will"	Andrew Nicholls and Darrell Vickers	Paul Schibili	January 5, 2008	112	N/A
12	"Will and Day Out"	Daniel Bryan Franklin	Frank Ramirez	January 5, 2008	112	N/A
13	"Will Crafted Gift"	Terry Saltsman	Ron Migliore	January 19, 2008	113	0.3/2
13	"Reading Railroaded"	Andrew Nicholls and Darrell Vickers	John Flagg	January 19, 2008	113	0.3/2
14	"Will's Whistle"	Daniel Bryan Franklin	Todd Sullivan	January 26, 2008	114	0.3/4
14	"Froget Me Not"	Andrew Nicholls and Darrell Vickers	Samuel To	January 26, 2008	114	0.3/4
15	"Flakey Snakey"	Alan Levin	Mario Cabrera	February 2, 2008	115	0.3/3
15	"Raiders of the Lost Ball"	Andrew Nicholls and Darrell Vickers	Dan Nosella	February 2, 2008	115	0.3/3
16	"You Bet"	Andrew Nicholls and Darrell Vickers	Williard Kitchen	February 9, 2008	116	N/A
16	"By Invitation Only"	Brad Birch	Trevor Hierons	February 9, 2008	116	N/A
17	"Wacky Talkie"	Alan Levin	Ray Jafelice	February 16, 2008	117	0.7/7
17	"Look, Up in the Sky"	Andrew Nicholls and Darrell Vickers	Dave Pemberton	February 16, 2008	117	0.7/7
18	"The Frog and the Moustache"	Daniel Bryan Franklin	Samuel To	February 23, 2008	118	0.5/4
18	"Put Me in the Ballgame"	Terry Saltsman	Frank Ramirez	February 23, 2008	118	0.5/4
19	"Doggie Day Afternoon"	Andrew Nichols and Darrel Vickers	Paul Schibli	March 1, 2008	119	0.4/3
19	"Blazin' Bike"	Brad Birch	Kervin Faria	March 1, 2008	119	0.4/3
20	"Frog Pox"	Shaun Graham	Blair Kitchen	March 8, 2008	120	0.4/3
20	"The Will and Sam Club"	Andrew Nicholls and Darrell Vickers	Blair Kitchen	March 8, 2008	120	0.4/3
21	"Will'd Famous"	Andrew Nicholls and Darrell Vickers	Ron Migliore	March 15, 2008	121	0.3/3
21	"Cleaning Toad Creek"	Andrew Nicholls and Darrell Vickers	Dan Nosella	March 15, 2008	121	0.3/3
22	"Drake'd Over the Coals"	Denise Fordham and Brad Birch	Jun Nasayao	March 22, 2008	122	0.3/3
22	"This Just In"	Andrew Nichols and Darrell Vickers	Frank Ramirez	March 22, 2008	122	0.3/3
23	"New Best Friend"	Daniel Bryan Franklin	Dave Pemberton	March 29, 2008	123	0.4/5
23	"No Picture Book"	Andrew Nichols and Darrell Nichols	Samuel To	March 29, 2008	123	0.4/5
24	"Shopping Spree"	Jan Robson	Jun Nasayao	April 12, 2008	124	0.3/3
24	"What's Eating Will"	Andrew Nichols and Darrell Vickers	John Flagg	April 12, 2008	124	0.3/3
25	"Keeper of the Key"	John Mein	Paul Schibli	April 26, 2008	125	0.4/3
25	"Willblasting"	Andrew Nicholls and Darrell Vickers	Dan Nosella	April 26, 2008	125	0.4/3
26	"Glasses Half Full"	Andrew Nicholls and Darrell Vickers	Jason Thomson	May 3, 2008	126	0.3/3
26	"Meeting Frog Boy"	Andrew Nicholls and Darrell Vickers	Dave Pemberton	May 3, 2008	126	0.3/3

== Educational relevance ==
In the U.S., the show's educational elements have qualified it as an E/I show.
