= Futz! =

- Genre: Comedy
- Created by: Vadim Kapridov
- Directed by: Vadim Kapridov
- Composer: Doug Pennock
- Country of origin: Canada
- Original languages: Silent; Interjection
- No. of episodes: 26

Production
- Running time: 3 minutes
- Production company: 9 Story Entertainment

Original release
- Network: Teletoon
- Release: August 24, 2007 – January 6, 2008

Futz! is a Canadian short-form animated television series created by Vadim Kapridov and produced by 9 Story Entertainment for Teletoon. The series revolves around the eponymous main character and his zany adventures. Eschewing verbal dialogue, the series portrays the escapades of this character, who has been described as an anti-hero, in a comedic light. Each episode of the series is 3 minutes long. The series aired from August 24, 2007 to January 6, 2008, with a total of 26 episodes were produced.

== Episodes ==
The show consists of 26 episodes of 3 minutes each. Australian airdates are provided for ABC1 or ABC2 depending on the episode; repeats of the series have also aired on ABC3. Episodes are provided in the Canadian order.

No.	Title	Original AUS air date
1	"Double-Oh Futz"	April 14, 2008
2	"Tomb Later Futz!"	April 28, 2008
3	"Flying Ace Futz!"	April 21, 2008
4	"Wash, Clip And Futz!"	May 5, 2008
5	"High Seas Futz!"	May 12, 2008
6	"Toga The Line Futz!"	May 19, 2008
7	"Spring Fashion Futz!"	May 26, 2008
8	"Bird Pane Futz!"	June 2, 2008
9	"Big Top Futz!"	June 9, 2008
10	"Hold Your Hoses Futz!"	June 16, 2008
11	"Dancing With The Futz!"	July 14, 2008
12	"Strife Guard Futz!"	June 23, 2008
13	"Kung Fu Futz!ing"	June 30, 2008
14	"Strange Coach Futz!"	July 7, 2008
15	"Jurassic Futz!"	July 21, 2008
16	"Pumpin' Futz!"	July 28, 2008
17	"Par For The Futz!"	August 4, 2008
18	"Farmer In The Futz!"	August 11, 2008
19	"Sputnik Futz!-Nik"	August 18, 2008
20	"Watch, Shout And Race Futz!"	August 25, 2008
21	"Life In The Futz! Lane"	September 1, 2008
22	"Alpine Tale Futz!"	September 22, 2008
23	"A Lad'n Futz!"	September 29, 2008
24	"Crack! Snap! Futz!"	October 6, 2008
25	"Stunned-Man Futz!"	October 13, 2008
26	"Fool Filler Futz!"	October 20, 2008

== Production ==
The series is based on a web animation that appeared on United Feature Syndicate's website, Comics.com, where they posted a series of Flash cartoons called Mr. Futz in 2001. It was later picked up for television, with development beginning in 2002, with production commencing in December 2006 and ending on schedule in September 2007.

Original plans for the series called for full scripts with dialogue, including unproduced episodes written by Andrew Nicholls and Darrell Vickers.

== Broadcast ==
Futz! was first shown on Teletoon as a sneak preview on August 24, 2007. The series began airing regularly on September 3, 2007, ending on January 6, 2008, after 26 episodes. It also aired in Australia on ABC from April 14, 2008 to October 20, 2008 and was set to air on several other channels worldwide. On Teletoon, it has aired as an interstitial program following movies presented on the channel.

== Reception ==
Futz! awards and nominations
Year	Association	Category	Nominee	Result	Ref.
2008	Gemini Awards	Best Direction in an Animated Program or Series	Vadim Kapridov	Nominated	
