= Hong Ying Animation =

Taiwanese animation studio

Hong Ying Animation Co., Ltd. 鴻鷹動畫
- Formerly: Hung Long Animation Company (1986–1993)
- Type: Private
- Industry: Animation
- Founded: 1986; 40 years ago
- Founder: Bobby Hsieh
- Headquarters: Suzhou, Jiangsu, China; Taipei, Taiwan; Nanjing, Jiangsu, China
- Products: Feature films, television series
- Services: Animation outsourcing
- Divisions: Suzhou Hong Ying Animation Company Limited; Hung Long Animation Company Limited (1993–2003)
- Website: http://www.hong-ying.com.cn/

Hong Ying Animation Co., Ltd. (simplified Chinese: 鸿鹰动画; traditional Chinese: 鴻鷹動畫; pinyin: Hóng Yīng Dònghuà) is a Chinese-Taiwanese animation studio founded in 1986. The studio has worked on several American and other foreign cartoons.

== Works ==
Hong Ying animated, inked, and/or painted for the following TV shows:

- Ace Ventura: Pet Detective (Season 3)
- The Adventures of Sam (layouts only)
- Adventures of Sonic the Hedgehog
- Animal Stories
- Archie's Weird Mysteries
- Alienators: Evolution Continues
- Basquash!
- Batman: The Animated Series (layouts only)
- The Butterfly Lovers: Leon and Jo
- Care Bears: Adventures in Care-a-lot
- Le Chevalier D'Eon (made in France)
- Chowder
- Christmas in Cartoonland
- Clifford the Big Red Dog
- DC Nation (Deadman segments)
- Dennis and Gnasher (made in the UK)
- Downtown
- Double Dragon
- DinoSquad
- Elliot Moose
- Extreme Dinosaurs
- Gadget Boy & Heather
- Gadget & the Gadgetinis
- Gargoyles
- Golgo 13 TV Series
- Gordon the Garden Gnome
- Gowap
- The Haunted Pumpkin of Sleep Hollow
- Hero: 108
- Hey Arnold!
- Horrid Henry (Season 1; Additional animation by Studio Baestarts in Hungary)
- Horseland
- iZ and the Zizzles
- James Bond Jr.
- Kenny the Shark (overseas animation)
- Kung Fu Dino Posse (was hired, but not in post-production)
- Liberty's Kids
- LeapFrog (direct-to-video only)
- Llama Llama
- The New Adventures of Madeline
- Madeline: Lost in Paris
- Mary-Kate and Ashley in Action!
- Mighty Max
- Mortal Kombat: Defenders of the Realm
- Moville Mysteries (Nelvana: Canada)
- My Goldfish Is Evil!
- Nickelodeon's DIC Movie Toons
- Oscar's Orchestra
- Pelswick (Nelvana: Canada)
- Phineas and Ferb
- Pocket Dragon Adventures
- Pond Life
- Princess Gwenevere and the Jewel Riders
- Robotomy
- Sabrina: The Animated Series (entire series)
- Sabrina's Secret Life
- Secret Mountain Fort Awesome
- Seven Little Monsters (Seasons 1–2) (Nelvana: Canada)
- Sherlock Holmes in the 22nd Century
- Sonic Underground (complete series)
- Stargate Infinity
- Strawberry Shortcake (2003/2007)
- Street Sharks
- Stunt Dawgs
- Super Dave
- Sushi Pack
- The Likeaballs
- The Magic Key
- The Wacky World of Tex Avery
- Taichi Kid
- Trollz
- What About Mimi? (Studio B: Canada)
- X-Men: The Animated Series ("Graduation Day")
- Yamucha's – Kung Fu Academy
- YoYoMan
- Yvon of the Yukon (Studio B: Canada)

As a subcontractor for Wang Film Productions:

- The Adventures of Raggedy Ann and Andy
- Beetlejuice
- The Care Bears Family
- Clifford's Fun with Letters
- The Comic Strip ("Street Frogs" and "Karate Kat" segments)
- The Completely Mental Misadventures of Ed Grimley
- Dink, the Little Dinosaur
- Eek! The Cat/The Terrible Thunderlizards
- Garbage Pail Kids
- Police Academy: The Animated Series
- Popeye and Son
- A Pup Named Scooby-Doo
- The Real Ghostbusters (Slimer! segments)
- Rockin' with Judy Jetson
- Scooby-Doo and the Ghoul School
- The Smurfs
- Wildfire
- The World of David the Gnome
