= Andrew Nicholls and Darrell Vickers =

Canadian writers (born 1957)

- Born: Andrew John Nicholls; 14 July 1957 (age 69); Croxley Green, Hertfordshire, England
- Occupations: Screenwriter, television writer, executive producer, playwright, musician, short story writer, poet
- Children: 1

Andrew Nicholls and Darrell Vickers
- Born: Darrell Vickers; 17 July 1957 (age 69); Derbyshire, England
- Occupations: Screenwriter, television writer, executive producer, playwright, musician
- Children: 1

Andrew John Nicholls (born 14 July 1957) and Darrell Vickers (born 17 July 1957) are an English-born Canadian writing team. They were head writers of The Tonight Show Starring Johnny Carson from 1988 to 1992. Both their families moved independently from England to the same town in Canada, and they met in junior high in 1969, where they began collaborating almost immediately. The duo moved to Los Angeles in 1983 to continue their careers, and are members of WGA, WGC, SACD, SOCAN, ACCT, and ATAS.

== Career ==
Nicholls and Vickers began writing music and comedy together while at Ridgeway Junior High School (now École élémentaire Antonine Maillet or Antonine-Maillet Elementary School) in Oshawa, Ontario, Canada. After high school they wrote for stage, radio, TV, syndicated cartoonists, and stand-up comedians.

From 1979 to 1982, they performed in Southern Ontario as Nobby Clegg and the Civilians, after having received airplay at Brampton alternative station CFNY-FM with home-recorded songs. The band found some success with the singles "Essay - Me Dad" and "I Wanna Be in Commercials", which were also included in the 1981 compilation Toronto Calling. Nicholls and Vickers later used the band's name for a character on the Showtime show Rude Awakening. In that series, the Nobby Clegg character was played by Roger Daltrey, best known as the lead singer of The Who.

From 1986 to 1992, they helped write 770 hours of produced material for The Tonight Show Starring Johnny Carson, earning four Emmy nominations, and were the show's head writers from December 1988 until Carson's retirement on 22 May 1992.

In 1997, the pair received a Genie nomination, Best Animated Series, for Ned's Newt (Nelvana). They also received a WGC nomination for the series in 1999. The title character was voiced by Harland Williams and was cited in several interviews as one of the favorite TV shows of legendary cartoonist Ed Gorey.

In 2001, the two received a Gemini nomination for "Best Comedy Series" for their work developing, writing the pilot, and serving as story editors on John Callahan's Quads!.

The duo were nominated for a Pulcinella Award, Best Animated Episode, at the 2003 Cartoons on the Bay Festival in Positano, Italy, for both The Adventures of Jimmy Neutron: Boy Genius and The World of Tosh. They were again nominated for the Pulcinella for Best Kids Series at the 2015 festival, for Pumpkin Reports.

In 2008, Will & Dewitt was awarded a Gemini Award for Best Pre-School Series. Nicholls & Vickers wrote the series bible and 28 episodes, and served as story editors.

Vickers co-founded a music band in 2008 called Death of the Author Brigade — which was formed through the internet (none of the band members have met in person). The band broke up in 2013. See Solo Projects (Vickers) for additional details.

In 2010, Nicholls wrote an exposé about the entertainment industry and the life of a television writer and showrunner, Valuable Lessons: How I Made (And Lost) Seven Million Dollars Writing For Over A Hundred Shows You Never Heard Of. See Solo Projects (Nicholls) for additional details.

Since 2012, Nicholls has published short fiction in Black Clock, The Santa Monica Review, Cosmonauts Avenue, The Boiler Journal, New World Writing, Literature for Life, Kugelmass, The Sherman Oaks Review of Books, Shark Reef, and elsewhere.

Between 2015 and 2017, Vickers commenced on several solo television projects: executive producing the first season and writing two episodes of Hitting the Breaks (2015–16); writing the sitcom pilot for Chasing Tail (2017); creating and writing the pilot for the reality cooking show, Feast of a Lifetime, starring Lynn Crawford (2017); creating the reality show, You're the Boss (2017); and writing for the hour-long comedy drama, Marley Roberts (2017).

In 2016, MOJAVE! The Musical — featuring the tagline: "Go Ahead And Run...It Loves Fast Food," with book, music, and lyrics by Nicholls and Vickers — was directed by Mindy Cooper at its first reading on May 25, 2016, in the Della Davidson Studio, UC Davis, California.

In 2019, Nicholls' full-length stage play {LOVE/Logic}, directed by Josy Miller, had its world premiere at the Wyatt Theater Pavilion, UC Davis, California.

Nicholls published a how-to book in 2020 about the work and art of creating comedy for print, TV and stage: Comedy Writer: Craft advice from a veteran of sitcoms, sketch, animation, late night, print and stage comedy. That same year, Nicholls began publishing poetry in the online journal Light: a journal of light verse since 1992.

In 2021, Nicholls mounted his play, A Bee in a Jar, with the UC Davis Department of Theatre and Dance and Catalyst: A Theatre Think Tank, virtually using OBS Studio and Zoom to cast in three time zones.

In 2022, Vickers wrote the pilot script for the television series, Mama Zen. That same year, Nicholls' play, Yes, And... won First Place in the Frostburg, Maryland 13th Annual One-Act Play Festival.

In 2023, Nicholls' play Jinx had a staged reading, directed by Bob Burgos, at the Ensemble Studio Theater in Los Angeles.

In 2024, Yes, And... was paired with a Nicholls & Vickers debut play, In Bob We Trust, for a run at the Embassy Theater in Cumberland, MD. That same year, Slow Lightning Lit published Nicholls’ 441-stanza comic poem As Man Is To God, on the filming of Werner Herzog’s Fitzcarraldo. Nicholls performed the poem for a sold-out audience at L.A.’s Lyric Hyperion Theater on May 10th 2025. He reprised the performance at London's Gatehouse Theatre on September 19th, 2026. https://www.broadwayworld.com/uk-regional/regional/As-Man-is-to-God-4399070

On April 5, 2025, L.A.’s Ensemble Studio Theater, as part of its Winterfest program, hosted Nicholls’ play The Tower of Hanoi, directed by William Charlton.

As a writing team, Vickers and Nicholls have over 1,200 hours of produced television credits, including creating twenty TV series, writing and producing 38 television and radio pilots, and writing and producing over 400 episodes of children's TV (as of 2022). In November of 2023, they were inducted into the Walk Of Fame in their home town of Oshawa, Ontario.

== Partial writing credits ==
=== Stand-up comedians ===
- George Carlin
- Garry Shandling
- Rodney Dangerfield
- Alan Thicke
- Joan Rivers
- The Unknown Comic
- Mickey Rooney (1984–1994)

=== Film ===
Year	Title	Credits	Studio	Notes
1992	Noises Off	Additional Material by	Touchstone Pictures	
2004	A Year Off	Screenplay by	Dor Film / DOR Film Productions (Vienna)	unreleased film
2006	Casper's Scare School	Screenplay by	Cartoon Network	

=== Television (animation and live-action) ===
Year	Title	Credits	Network/Studio	Notes
1976–1978	We're Only Joking	Writers	CHCH	
1978	Screech	Writers	CHCH, Megamedia TV	
1979–1980	Golden Horseshoe Theatre	Writers	CHCH	
1980	Flappers	Writers	CBC	
1983	K-KID TV	Writers	Olympic Films	
1983	Thicke of the Night	Writers	MGM Television, Metromedia	syndicated talk show
1984	The Love Boat	Writers	ABC	
1984	George Carlin's Apt. 2-C aka Apt. 2C	Writers	HBO, Cablestuff	
1985	Danger Bay	Writers	CBC Television, Disney Channel	
1985–1988	Check it Out!	Story Editors, Writers (11 episodes)	CTV, USA Cable, D.L. Taffner	
1986–1992	The Tonight Show Starring Johnny Carson	Writers (1986-1992), Head Writers (1988-1992)	NBC, Carson Tonight	
1989–1991	The Tonight Show Anniversary Specials	Writers (26th), Head Writers (27-29th)	NBC, Carson Tonight	
1990	This World Now	Writers	CHCH, Megamedia TV	
1990	Doghouse	Writers	YTV	
1991–1992	Drexell's Class	Created by, Creative Consultants, Writers (four episodes)	Fox	Starring Dabney Coleman
1992	Have Mercy	Wrote pilot, Executive Producers	CBS, Lorimar	Starring Isabella Hoffman and Patrick Warburton
1993	The Mighty Quinns	Wrote pilot, Executive Producers	Warner Bros., CBS	Starring Robert Urich
1993	Death and Taxes aka Death + Taxes	Wrote pilot, Executive Producers	NBC, Lorimar	Starring Teri Garr and Craig Bierko
1993	It Had To Be You	Wrote pilot, Executive Producers	CBS, Warner Bros.	Starring Faye Dunaway
1993	The Trouble with Larry	Created by, Executive Producers	CBS, Warner Bros.	Starring Bronson Pinchot and Courteney Cox
1994	The George Carlin Show	Writers (two episodes)	Fox, Warner Bros.	
1994–1995	The Parent 'Hood	Created by, Executive Producers	The WB	Starring Robert Townsend
1995–1996	Campus Cops	Executive Producers	Universal, USA Network, John Landis	
1996	Love And Marriage	Writers	Fox	
1996	Malcolm & Eddie	Creative Consultants	Columbia TriStar, UPN	
1996–1997	Pearl	Creative Consultants	CBS, Witt-Thomas Productions	
1997–1998	The Magic Hour	Writers	Fox	
1997–2000	Ned's Newt	Developed by (1997–00)	Teletoon (now Cartoon Network Canada) Nelvana, Fox Kids (US)	
1998	Hollywood Dog	Wrote pilot	HBO Independent Productions	Starring William H. Macy
1998	Bob and Margaret	Creative Consultants (1999)	Nelvana, Comedy Central, Channel 4 (UK)	also wrote one story (2001)
1998	You Wish	Co-Executive Producers, Wrote one episode	ABC, Disney	
1998	Smart Guy	Creative Consultants, Wrote one episode	The WB, Walt Disney Television	
1998	Rude Awakening	Wrote three episodes	Showtime, Mandalay TV	
1999	The Blob	Wrote pilot	MTV, John Landis	
1999	Divorced on Mars	Wrote pilot	Salter Street TV	
2000	Kevin's Castle (pilot)	Co-Created by, Executive Producers	Disney Channel, Family Channel Canada	
2000–2002	John Callahan's Pelswick	Developed by, Wrote pilot, Story Editors	Nelvana, Nickelodeon, CBC (Canada)	
2000–2001	John Callahan's Quads!	Developed by, Wrote pilot, Story Editors	Nelvana, Teletoon, SBS (Australia)	
2002	Inspector Gadget	Wrote live-action pilot	PAX, DIC Entertainment	
2002	The World of Tosh	Story Editors	Nickelodeon (UK)	
2002–2003	The Cube	Created by, Wrote pilot	The WB, MTV, Triage	reality-series
2002–2004	The Adventures of Jimmy Neutron, Boy Genius	Wrote nine episodes	Nickelodeon	
2003	Rocketship Bedroom	Created by, Written by, Produced with Bob Staake	Disney Channel	
2003	Last Girls	Wrote pilot	Happy Life (Sweden)	now defunct production company
2003	Mr. Magoo	Wrote live-action pilot	Classic Media	
2003	The Fairly OddParents	Wrote three episodes	Nickelodeon	
2003	Strange Days at Blake Holsey High	Wrote one episode	Discovery Kids, Fireworks	aka Black Hole High
2004	Super Cooper	Cowrote pilot script, Developed Series	Disney TVA, Disney Channel	with creator Steve Billnitzer
2004	W.I.T.C.H.	Developed Series, Executive Producers	Disney Channel, ABC Family (US), France 3, Jetix	also wrote pilot and ten episodes
2004	Futz!	Wrote two episodes	9 Story Entertainment	
2005	The Office Temps	Created by	Global TV, Lone Eagle Entertainment	
2005	Super Chicken	Developed pilot	DreamWorks Animation	
2006	George of the Jungle	Developed pilot, Wrote 15 episodes	Cartoon Network, Classic Media	
2007	Will and Dewitt	Created bible, Developed by, Story Editors	YTV, Kids' WB, WildBrain	wrote 28 episodes
2007	Back at the Barnyard	Wrote one episode	Nickelodeon	
2007	Rocky and Bullwinkle	Wrote fourth season DVD promo shorts	DreamWorks Classics	
2007	Monster Buster Club	Wrote two episodes	Toon Disney (US), Marathon	
2007	Kid vs. Kat	Created series bible	YTV, Studio B, Disney XD	
2007	Gerald McBoing-Boing	Wrote eight episodes	Cartoon Network, Teletoon	
2008	Casper's Scare School	Created bible, Wrote 18 episodes	TF1 (France)	
2008	League of Super Evil	Wrote three episodes	YTV, Cartoon Network, WildBrain	
2008	Walter and Tandoori	Developed by, Wrote three episodes	Image Entertainment (Montreal)	
2008	Noonbory and the Super Seven	Wrote five episodes	Daewon Media	
2008	The New Adventures of Nanoboy	Wrote two episodes	Scrawl Studios (Singapore)	
2008	K-9	Original development	Jetix UK, Park Entertainment, Network 10 (Australia)	
2008	Chateau Hofstadter	Wrote series bible, Developed by	ARTE France, One Film, Maha Film	
2008	Mr. Quaver	Developed series	Mastran Music Group	
2009	Dreamkix	Writers	Design Storm (Korea)	
2009	Shaking Dance Squad Force	Created series bible, Wrote pilot	Cookie Jar	
2009–2010	Hot Wheels Battle Force 5	Wrote three episodes	Nerd Corps Entertainment, Mattel, Nelvana	
2009–2010	Peter Pepper's Pet Spectacular (pilot)	Created series bible, Story Editors, Writers	Cookie Jar Entertainment, Clockwork Zoo	
2011	Almost Naked Animals	Wrote one episode	9 Story Media Group, YTV	
2011	Decidedly Debra aka Debra!	Writers	Cookie Jar, Family Channel	
2011	Health Nutz	Rewrote episodes (two seasons)	APTN	
2011	Rated A for Awesome	Wrote two episodes	Nerd Corps Entertainment	
2015	Pumpkin Reports	Wrote 50 episodes	Boing (France)	internationally syndicated
2018	Barbie Dreamhouse Adventures	Wrote one episode, Staff (season one)	Netflix, Mattel	

=== Radio ===
Year	Title	Credits	Network	Notes
1980	The Alleged Report	Additional Material by		syndicated comedy series
1980	The Continuing Adventures Of... Adventureman!	Created and Written by	CBC Radio	comedy series
1980	Countless Travels of Matthew Matics	Created and Written by	CBC Radio	comedy series
1981	Great Canadian Characters	Created and Written by	CBC Radio	series
1983	This Day in History	Material by	CBC Radio	series

=== Comic strip ===
Year	Title	Credits	Publisher	Notes
1979–2006	Frank & Ernest	Written by	United Media	syndicated comic strip

=== Band ===
Year	Name	Credits	Songs	Notes
1979–1982	Nobby Clegg and the Civilians	Co-founders, Music and Lyrics by	Essay: Me Dad aka My Old Man; I Wanna Be In Commercials	punk-folk songs (Apple Music, Amazon Music), video for "Essay, Me Dad" on YouTube

=== Website ===
Year	Name	Credits	Notes
2004–2005	Fezgod.com	Created and Developed by — Design, Graphics, and Art by Bob Staake (his official site)	online humour site

=== Musical ===
Year	Title	Credits	Venue	Notes
2016	MOJAVE! The Musical	Music, Lyrics, and Book by	UC Davis – Della Davidson Studio	world premiere May 25, 2016

=== Solo projects ===
==== Nicholls ====
Year	Title	Medium	Notes	
2010	Valuable Lessons (updated Kindle Edition)	ebook	How I Made (And Lost) Seven Million Dollars Writing For Over A Hundred Shows You Never Heard Of	
2012	(published in various journals)	short fiction	see main article for journal titles	
2019	{LOVE/Logic}	stage play	world premiere May 16, 2019	
2020	Comedy Writer	book	Craft advice from a veteran of sitcoms, sketch, animation, late night, print and stage comedy	
2020–	(published in Light)	poetry	"America's oldest and best-known journal of light verse"	
2021	A Bee in a Jar	stage play	virtual world premiere February 19, 2021	
2024	As Man Is to God	book	As Man Is to God	a poem on the making of Herzog's Fitzcarraldo

==== Vickers ====
Year	Title	Medium	Network/Studio	Notes
2008–2013	Death of the Author Brigade	music		Cofounder (internet band where none of the musicians have met in person)
2015–2016	Hitting the Breaks	television	Pureflix Entertainment	Executive Producer (two episodes)
2016	Chasing Tail	television (sitcom)	Chockstone Pictures	Wrote pilot, Writer
2017	Feast of a Lifetime	television (reality cooking show)	Bell Media, Team Thicke	Created by, Wrote pilot, starring Lynn Crawford
2017	You're the Boss	television (reality show)	Wilshire Productions, Team Thicke	Created by
2017	Marley Roberts	television (comedy-drama)	Chockstone Pictures	Writer
2017	Bu House	television	Chockstone Pictures	Created by, Wrote pilot
2022	Mama Zen	television	Pink Light Productions	Wrote pilot
2022	Snow Dogs!	television	Steve Gerbson Productions	Developed pilot
2022–2023	Sisterhood of Surreypur	television	Baweja Productions	Cowrote pilot and bible
