= Charles E. Bastien =

Canadian animation director (1962–2023)

Charles Edward Bastien (October 14, 1962 – March 21, 2023), also known as Ted Bastien, was a Canadian animation director, most noted as a three-time Canadian Screen Award winner for his work as the director of the television series Paw Patrol.

A native of Sarnia, Ontario, he was a graduate of the animation program at Sheridan College. He joined Nelvana the following year, serving as a storyboard artist, designer, art director and animation director on various television series until moving to Guru Studio in 2015.

With Nelvana, he received a Gemini Award nomination for Best Production Design or Art Direction at the 5th Gemini Awards in 1990 for his work on Beetlejuice and a Daytime Emmy Award nomination at the 24th Daytime Emmy Awards in 1997 for his work on The Magic School Bus, and won an International Emmy Award in 2015 for his work on Mike the Knight. With Guru he received five Canadian Screen Award nominations for Best Direction in an Animated Program or Series for his work on PAW Patrol, winning at the 6th Canadian Screen Awards in 2018, the 8th Canadian Screen Awards in 2020, and posthumously at the 11th Canadian Screen Awards in 2023.

Bastien died of cancer on March 21, 2023, at the age of 60.

== Filmography ==
=== Art department ===
- Star Wars: Droids - 1985-86
- Ewoks - 1986
- The Care Bears Adventure in Wonderland - 1987
- My Pet Monster - 1987
- Clifford's Fun with Letters - 1988
- Babar: The Movie - 1989
- Beetlejuice - 1989–1991
- Babar - 1989–1991
- Little Rosey - 1990–1991
- Rupert - 1991
- The Rosey and Buddy Show - 1992
- Fievel's American Tails - 1992
- Cadillacs and Dinosaurs - 1993–1994
- Magic Adventures of Mumfie - 1994–1997
- The Magic School Bus - 1995–1997
- Journey to the Center of the Earth - 1996
- An Angel for Christmas - 1996
- Extreme Ghostbusters - 1997
- Freaky Stories - 1997
- The Pirates and the Prince - 1997
- Little Bear - 1998–2000
- Pelswick - 2001–2002
- Braceface - 2001–2005
- John Callahan's Quads! - 2001–2002
- Cyberchase - 2002
- Clone High - 2002–2003
- Larryboy: The Cartoon Adventures - 2002–2003
- Seven Little Monsters - 2003
- Jacob Two-Two - 2003
- 6teen - 2004
- Treasure of the Hidden Planet - 2004
- Bigfoot Presents: Meteor and the Mighty Monster Trucks - 2006
- Handy Manny - 2006–2007
- Johnny Test - 2007
- Wayside - 2007–2008
- Paw Patrol: The Movie - 2021

=== Direction ===
- Kids for Character - 1996
- Gargoyles - 1996 (season 3 only)
- The Magic School Bus - 1995–1997 (seasons 2-3, as well as season 4 episodes 10-13)
- Little Bear - 1996–1999 (most of season 4)
- Anatole - 1998
- Roswell Conspiracies: Aliens, Myths and Legends - 1999 (episode director)
- Elliot Moose - 1999–2000
- Rescue Heroes - 1999–2000 (season 1 only)
- Seven Little Monsters - 2000 (episode director on one episode; uncredited)
- Pelswick - 2000–2002 (season 1)
- Braceface - 2001–2004
- Handy Manny - 2006–2012
- Mike the Knight - 2013–2015 (seasons 2-3)
- Paw Patrol - 2016–2023 (season 3 episode 7-season 10)
