= Seven Little Monsters (TV series) =

2000 Animated television series

- Genre: Animated series Fantasy; Comedy
- Based on: Seven Little Monsters by Maurice Sendak
- Directed by: Neil Affleck; Charles E. Bastien (S1E4 only); Lynn Reist; Glenn Sylvester
- Voices of: Joanne Vannicola; Colin Mochrie; Dwayne Hill; Seán Cullen; Michele Scarabelli; Debra McGrath
- Theme music composer: Barenaked Ladies
- Opening theme: "Seven Little Monsters" by Barenaked Ladies
- Composer: Lesley Barber
- Countries of origin: Canada; China (S1–2); Philippines (S3)
- Original language: English
- No. of seasons: 3
- No. of episodes: 40 (54 segments)

Production
- Executive producers: Michael Hirsh; John B. Carls; Patrick Loubert (S1–2); Clive A. Smith (S1–2); Tom Pong (S1–2); Frank Saperstein (S1–2); Maurice Sendak; Scott Dyer (S3); Mimbi L. Eloriaga (S3)
- Producers: Tracy Leach (S3); Susie Grondin (S3)
- Running time: 26 minutes
- Production companies: Nelvana Limited; Suzhou Hong Ying Animation Corporation Limited (S1–2); Philippine Animation Studio Inc. (S3)

Original release
- Network: PBS Kids (United States); Treehouse TV (Canada, S1–2); YTV (Canada, S3)
- Release: September 30, 2000 – October 6, 2003

Seven Little Monsters, or simply 7 Little Monsters, is a comedy animated cartoon series about a family of seven monsters and their mother. It is based on the book of the same name by Maurice Sendak and directed by Neil Affleck, Lynn Reist, and Glenn Sylvester. It was co-produced by Nelvana Limited, Suzhou Hong Ying Animation Corporation Limited for the first two seasons and Philippine Animation Studio Inc. for the third season, produced in association with PBS.

== Premise ==
The show that focuses on seven monsters (Brothers Two, Three, Four, Five, and Seven and Sisters One and Six), each named after a different number from one to seven, and each has unique physical characteristics.

== Characters ==
- One (voiced by Joanne Vannicola) is the oldest and the only monster who can fly. She is a tomboy, a natural athlete who really loves sports, and somewhat of a tattletale. She often gets her siblings into trouble, but still cares deeply for them.
- Two (voiced by Colin Mochrie) is the most helpful of the monsters and has a prominent long nose which he often "sticks in where it doesn't belong".
- Three (voiced by Dwayne Hill) is a dramatic monster who takes on a different personality and voice in every episode, often to the dismay of others.
- Four (voiced by Seán Cullen) is the middle monster who is the epitome of rambunctious angst in his family. He is often seen with his brother Five. Despite his grumpy personality, he deeply loves Five.
- Five (voiced by Seán Cullen) is the biggest and most childlike of the monsters who only speaks few words with a thick speech impediment. He has an enormous tongue and a voracious appetite.
- Six (voiced by Michele Scarabelli) is the resident ballerina of the group who thinks she is the most beautiful of the monsters. Unlike her sister One, she has much more feminine interests. She wears a purple leotard with a white tutu, has a star wand, and speaks with a Queens accent.
- Seven (voiced by Seán Cullen) is the youngest who has the ability to easily unscrew his head. He is the most gentle and timid monster who is afraid of bugs and is very fond of cheese, and speaks in a Boris Karloff-esque voice.
- Mom (voiced by Debra McGrath) is the adoptive mother of the seven monsters. A kindly, babushka-wearing witch, she is much smaller than her children and speaks with a European accent.
- Mary (voiced by Tara Strong) is the monsters' psychedelic neighbor and good friend. She is the leader of a club called the Purple Pixies, which consists of other club members: Wendy (the only one who talks beside Mary), Angela, and Kate, who dislikes Six, and always has a gloomy angry look.
- Sam is Five's pet turtle.
- Belinda is the monster family's pet cow.
- Freddie is Mary's pet dog.

== Music ==
The theme song was performed by the Canadian rock band Barenaked Ladies, who also performed the theme to CBS’ The Big Bang Theory.

== Broadcast ==
The show initially started airing in the U.S. on PBS, as a segment on the weekend PBS Kids Bookworm Bunch block, on September 30, 2000. The first season ended on December 23, 2000, with repeats of the first season continuing through October 2001. The second season ran from November 3, 2001 to January 26, 2002, again during the PBS Kids Bookworm Bunch block. Repeats of the second season continued until September 2004, when the PBS Kids Bookworm Bunch was discontinued.

The third season premiered on January 6, 2003 on PBS, and was paired with The Berenstain Bears in the same half-hour timeslot on weekdays; thus, new episodes were only 15 minutes in duration, as opposed to 30 minutes for the first two seasons. The Berenstain Bears began filling the entire half-hour timeslot on most PBS member stations starting September 15, 2003, resulting in some episodes of the third season of Seven Little Monsters never being broadcast on PBS. Some PBS stations continued airing episodes of the third season until August 2004.

In Canada, it was aired on Treehouse TV from February 4, 2001 to February 3, 2002. The series was then moved to YTV from 2002 to 2005.

== Episodes ==
=== Season 1 (2000) ===
These episodes aired as segments on the PBS Kids Bookworm Bunch.

No. overall	No. in season	Title	Directed by	Written by	Original air date
1	1	"Good Morning!"	Glenn Sylvester	Jeph Loeb	September 30, 2000
The seven monsters are sent by Mom to buy some milk. However, this results in chaos when Six falls asleep on the bus and when Seven loses his head.
2	2	"Good Night!"	Glenn Sylvester	Jeph Loeb	October 7, 2000
The seven monsters have a hard time getting some sleep, so Mom tells them a bedtime story.
3	3	"The Mystery of the Missing Five"	Glenn Sylvester	Seán Cullen	October 14, 2000
Five goes around town to prove he's a good boy after Four hurt his feelings. Three goes detective to help the others find him.
4	4	"Seven Monsters and a Baby"	Charles E. Bastien	Matthew Daniel Weisman	October 21, 2000
The seven monsters take charge of chores in the house so Mama can have a restful nap. This gets complicated when they have to babysit Mrs. Mulligan's baby.
5	5	"Are You My Family?"	Glenn Sylvester	Ian Weir	October 28, 2000
Upset by One's hurtful remarks, Six goes away to find a new family. Meanwhile, the other monsters are in disarray without Six to help them prepare for Mother's Day.
6	6	"Please Mr. Postman"	Glenn Sylvester	Matthew Daniel Weisman	November 4, 2000
Two misses a trip to the park to wait for an important package. The monsters also need their picture taken, except that Seven's head is missing.
7	7	"Doctor, Doctor!"	Glenn Sylvester	John Pellatt & Kenn Scott	November 11, 2000
Two catches a cold, so the other monsters try to help him get better so he can come with them to the movies.
8	8	"Along Came Mary"	Glenn Sylvester	Seán Cullen	November 18, 2000
Mary has moved in next door. The monsters compete to be her best friend, until she tells them they are equally nifty.
9	9	"A Monster's Best Friend"	Glenn Sylvester	Michael Thoma	November 25, 2000
The monsters bring home a puppy as a pet. They learn to train and love the puppy and win back Belinda's affections.
10	10	"Spooky"	Glenn Sylvester	Matthew Daniel Weisman	December 2, 2000
The power goes out during a thunderstorm and the monsters are scared.
11	11	"Plooky"	Glenn Sylvester	Seán Cullen	December 9, 2000
When Mom wins a video camera, Four becomes a movie director and he orders the rest of the monsters to make a video with him.
12	12	"Fair Play"	Glenn Sylvester	John Pellatt & Kenn Scott	December 16, 2000
Seven teaches all the monsters to work as a team to win the big soccer game.
13	13	"Lost and Found"	Glenn Sylvester	Seán Cullen	December 23, 2000
When Five finds a wallet with money at the park, the monsters find out that it's not their money. They learn that honesty is the best policy.

=== Season 2 (2001–02) ===
All episodes in this season are directed by Neil Affleck.

No. overall	No. in season	Title	Written by	Original air date
14	1	"Losing Sam"	Seán Cullen	November 3, 2001
Five wins a pet turtle called Sam. But when Sam goes missing, Five and the other monsters must cooperate with Sam's track.
15	2	"Out of Sight"	Michael Thoma	November 10, 2001
One can't see properly so the monsters go to the optometrist to help her educate and see properly.
16	3	"All the Marbles"	Jeph Loeb, John Pellatt and Kenn Scott	November 17, 2001
When Seven sees a Monster Marbles toy on television, he is fascinated with them and when the Monsters buy a birthday present for Mary, Seven buys the marbles.
17	4	"The Whole Tooth"	Seán Cullen	November 24, 2001
Six is losing a baby tooth and she has to learn what loose teeth are.
18	5	"My Fair One"	Seán Cullen and Sheila Dinsmore	December 1, 2001
One plays baseball with Billy and Six must help One become a baseball player.
19	6	"Splitting Hairs"	Michael Thoma	December 8, 2001
Two is lacking in confidence prior to appearing as a contestant on his favourite game show when he fears getting a haircut.
20	7	"Elephant!"	David Boswell	December 15, 2001
Four meets an elephant named Wendy. When Four and Wendy come home from the zoo, Four learns that animals need friends.
21	8	"A Day at the Firehouse"	Seán Cullen	December 22, 2001
The monsters visit Chief Lubomir to learn about fire safety which worries Seven.
22	9	"Runaway Mom"	Michael Thoma	December 29, 2001
After Mom is angry at the monsters for building a hot air balloon made out of pieces of the house and sends them to their room, the monsters think that Mom ran away.
23	10	"You Are What You Eat"	Seán Cullen	January 5, 2002
The County Fair is approaching and everyone is excited about the contest. One, Two Three and Six become farmers and learn how to grow vegetables; Four trains Five for a pie eating contest until he becomes unhealthy; and Seven and Mama bake pies for the contest together.
24	11	"April Fools"	Seán Cullen	January 12, 2002
The monsters write a play despite everyone's input, but Five and Four want comedy. They annoy the other monsters with practical jokes until they teach them a lesson.
25	12	"It's a Wonder-Four Life"	Seán Cullen	January 19, 2002
Four wishes he was an only child but he is surprised that he learns that his wish comes true.
26	13	"The Adventures of Super Three"	David Boswell and Matthew Daniel Weisman	January 26, 2002
The monsters pretend that they are the superheroes and villains in this world and make a mess in the basement rather than cleaning.

=== Season 3 (2003) ===
Note: In the U.S., all the episodes in season 3 (except for episodes 37 and 40) aired with The Berenstain Bears on PBS Kids.

No. overall	No. in season	Title	Written by	Directed by	Original air date
27a	1a	"All's Quiet on the Monster Front"	Kim Thompson	Neil Affleck	January 8, 2003 (on PBS Kids)
Two is trying to write a song for a contest and needs peace and quiet.
27b	1b	"Nightmare on Chestnut Street"	Seán Cullen	Neil Affleck	January 17, 2003 (on PBS Kids)
In trying to help Six get back to sleep after a scary dream, each monster shares their worst nightmare and soon they are all shaking with fear.
28a	2a	"Ear Spy"	Johanna Stein	Lynn Reist	January 14, 2003 (on PBS Kids)
Seven passes off his eavesdropping as mind-reading. Impressed, the family arranges a big show for all the neighborhood children.
28b	2b	"Bang! Zoom! To The Moon"	Seán Cullen	Lynn Reist	January 7, 2003 (on PBS Kids)
Four and his siblings try to build a rocket and go to the Moon.
29a	3a	"My Favorite Crustacean"	Kim Thompson	Neil Affleck	January 23, 2003 (on PBS Kids)
One's insistence to keep a growing hermit crab from their beach trip slowly inconveniences her siblings.
29b	3b	"Pennies for Seven"	Michael Thoma	Neil Affleck	January 24, 2003 (on PBS Kids)
The monsters compete to raise the most money for Sing-Song the panda's new home at the zoo.
30a	4a	"The Nose Knows"	Seán Cullen	Lynn Reist	January 27, 2003 (on PBS Kids)
When Four and Five compare Two's nose to Pinocchio's, Two becomes insecure.
30b	4b	"Gone But Not Four-Gotten"	Johanna Stein	Lynn Reist	January 28, 2003 (on PBS Kids)
Six wished Four's voice would go away, the monsters look all over town for it.
31a	5a	"High Noon"	Seán Cullen	Neil Affleck	January 15, 2003 (on PBS Kids)
The monsters wait impatiently for their cupcakes to finish baking, so they think of ways to pass the time.
31b	5b	"The Winning Streak"	Seán Cullen	Neil Affleck	January 29, 2003 (on PBS Kids)
Spurred on by hopes of winning a trophy and creamed corn, Six competes in a bowling tournament.
32a	6a	"A Clean Sweep"	Kim Thompson	Lynn Reist	January 30, 2003 (on PBS Kids)
With Mom sick in bed. One is in charge with supervising the others on her house chores.
32b	6b	"The Two Who Cried Ouch!"	Seán Cullen	Lynn Reist	January 31, 2003 (on PBS Kids)
Two gets sick again. Enjoying the attention, he decides to fake being sick.
33a	7a	"The Monster Trash"	Johanna Stein	Neil Affleck	February 3, 2003 (on PBS Kids)
Six pawns off her promise to take out the trash onto the other monsters; all of whom take an "out of sight out of mind approach" to their duty.
33b	7b	"The Bad Hop"	Seán Cullen	Neil Affleck	February 4, 2003 (on PBS Kids)
One's recent baseball injury makes her afraid to return and join the team.
34a	8a	"A Five-y Tale"	Kim Thompson	Lynn Reist	February 5, 2003 (on PBS Kids)
When Five is having trouble learning how to somersault, his siblings try to give him advice the same way Mom usually does - by telling a story.
34b	8b	"The Big Store"	Seán Cullen	Lynn Reist	February 6, 2003 (on PBS Kids)
Six gets lost on a shopping trip to a big department store after not paying attention to her mother's directions.
35a	9a	"Dinner for Breakfast"	Michael Thoma	Neil Affleck	January 21, 2003 (on PBS Kids)
Via a wish to the Plooky, the monsters' desire for everything being opposite to what it's supposed to be turns the world backwards.
35b	9b	"Drip, Drip, Drip!"	Seán Cullen	Neil Affleck	January 10, 2003 (on PBS Kids)
Four's negligence in turning off the water at home causes a drought during a heatwave.
36a	10a	"I'm Telling"	Johanna Stein	Lynn Reist	January 16, 2003 (on PBS Kids)
One's constant tattling on her siblings ruins their plans of a backyard camp out.
36b	10b	"Voyage To the Bottom Of the Cereal Box"	Seán Cullen	Lynn Reist	January 6, 2003 (on PBS Kids)
Three gets his hopes up waiting for a submarine from his favourite cereal.
37a	11a	"The Bad Word"	Seán Cullen	Neil Affleck	October 2, 2003 (on YTV)
When Two starts using curse words, Mom tells the monsters a story about a boy who also used curse words.
37b	11b	"Don't Pass Go"	Seán Cullen	Neil Affleck	October 3, 2003 (on YTV)
Seven wants to play a new board game but doesn't want to read the game's rules.
38a	12a	"Ahoy, Me Monsters"	Kim Thompson	Lynn Reist	January 13, 2003 (on PBS Kids)
A mysterious letter arrives for Pirate Captain Three, instructing him and his monster crew to solve a series of puzzles to find buried backyard treasure.
38b	12b	"A Pony Tale"	Kim Thompson	Lynn Reist	January 22, 2003 (on PBS Kids)
Six runs away after being pressured to give away her toy pony and later learns to give things away that she is too big for.
39a	13a	"No Place like Home"	Michael Thoma	Neil Affleck	January 20, 2003 (on PBS Kids)
When Uncle Schmooty offers to swap his mansion for the family home, One and the others learn that bigger doesn't necessarily mean better.
39b	13b	"Guys and Dolls"	Seán Cullen	Neil Affleck	January 9, 2003 (on PBS Kids)
Upon catching Five playing with dolls, Four disastrously attempts to get his brother to pursue masculine pursuits.
40a	14a	"And Baby Makes Eight"	Johanna Stein	Lynn Reist	October 6, 2003 (on YTV)
Three disguises as a baby to get the attention he wants, but then realizes this means missing out on the meteor shower tonight.
40b	14b	"These Are Our Lives!"	Seán Cullen	Lynn Reist	October 1, 2003 (on YTV)
A quarrelsome Four and Five consider disowning each other, until their mother tells them to clean out the garage together.
