= Pelswick =

Canadian-Chinese animated television series

- Also known as: John Callahan's Pelswick
- Created by: John Callahan
- Based on: The comic books by John Callahan
- Developed by: Andrew Nicholls; Darrell Vickers
- Directed by: Charles E. Bastien (season 1); Sean V. Jeffrey (episode 10, season 2)
- Starring: Robert Tinkler; Julie Lemieux; David Arquette; Peter Oldring; Phil Guerrero; Kim Kuhteubl; Tracey Moore; Tony Rosato; Ellen-Ray Hennessy
- Composer: Pure West
- Countries of origin: Canada; China
- Original language: English
- No. of seasons: 2
- No. of episodes: 26

Production
- Executive producers: Michael Hirsh; Patrick Loubert; Clive A. Smith; John Callahan; Deborah Levin
- Producer: Alice Bell
- Running time: 22 minutes
- Production companies: Nelvana Limited; Suzhou Hong Ying Animation Company Limited; Nickelodeon Productions

Original release
- Network: CBC (Canada); Nickelodeon (United States)
- Release: October 5, 2000 – November 15, 2002

Related
- John Callahan's Quads!

John Callahan's Pelswick (or simply Pelswick) is an animated comedy television series based on the comic books by John Callahan. It was co-produced by Nelvana Limited and Suzhou Hong Ying Animation Company Limited in association with the Canadian Broadcasting Corporation and Nickelodeon. Based on Callahan's comics, the series is about the title character, a paraplegic who uses a wheelchair, emphasizing that he lived a normal life. Callahan's dark humor was toned down somewhat, allowing the show to have a positive and life-affirming attitude appropriate for its audience. The series was groundbreaking for its portrayal of physically disabled people. In the United States, the series premiered on Nickelodeon and was billed as an original series on the network, despite not being part of Nicktoons.

== Characters ==
- Pelswick Eggert (voiced by Robert Tinkler) – A 13-year-old boy who uses a wheelchair. How he became a paraplegic is not revealed in the series, but the series' creators imply through commentary that it was due to a car accident. He dislikes it when people treat him differently because of his disability. He dislikes following the crowd and he goes by his own rules.
- Ace Nakamura (voiced by Phil Guerrero) – Pelswick's best friend of Japanese descent. Ace is technologically smarter than any of his friends, and is often the thinker of the situation.
- Goon Gunderson (voiced by Peter Oldring) – Pelswick's other best friend. Huge and slow-witted in his actions and thoughts, Goon is generally good-hearted but rather dangerous when angry. He does not know that wrestling is staged.
- Julie Smockford (voiced by Julie Lemieux) – A beautiful redhead and Pelswick's love interest. She dislikes all the cliques and popularity contests at school and seems to care mostly about her popularity and image. Julie is smart, dramatic, sometimes annoying, but cares a lot about Pelswick. Pelswick has a crush on her but she is fully oblivious about it. Julie believes in justice for all.
- Sandra Scoddle (voiced by Kim Kuhteubl) – Julie's snooty and arrogant best friend/rival and one of Pelswick's friends. She thinks she is better than everyone else and often disputes with Julie. She thinks she is cool, but she's not. She gets caught into the latest trends. Is of African-American ethnicity.
- Mr. Jimmy (voiced by David Arquette) – Pelswick's guardian angel who often gives him advice that confuses him until the last moment, no matter what it is. Pelswick cannot stand it when his advice doesn’t make sense. He is also the comic relief of the series.
- Kate Eggert (voiced by Tracey Moore) – Pelswick's precocious younger sister. She treats her reputation as a little sister like a business and usually blackmails Pelswick when butting into his business. She has dreams of owning a big corporation. She is 7 years old.
- Bobby Eggert – Pelswick's and Kate's baby brother. He rarely talks and admires Pelswick. Because their mother died in a car accident, Bobby doesn’t remember her.
- Quentin Eggert (voiced by Tony Rosato) – Pelswick, Kate and Bobby's politically correct father who works as a college professor until he is fired in "The Case of the Filched Files." He later gets his job back. He wants to do everything by papers. His wife was killed in the same car accident that made Pelswick into a paraplegic.
- Priscilla "Gram-Gram" Eggert (voiced by Ellen-Ray Hennessy) – Quentin's mother and Pelswick, Kate and Bobby's deranged grandmother. She often does "extreme" acts beyond that of a grandmother. Most of these acts results in her getting arrested.
- Boyd Scullarzo (voiced by Chuck Campbell) – The rival of Pelswick's school who likes bullying Pelswick, whom he names "Smellswick" and others, not physically (he's particularly against hitting Pelswick because he's in a wheelchair), but with humiliation.
- Vice Principal Ziegler (voiced by David Huband) – The vice principal of Alcatraz Jr High, Pelswick’s school. Despite his title, he usually assumes the role of a principal. Throughout the show, there is no state of there being a principal at Alcatraz Jr High. During the second episode of the series, this issue was mentioned by Goon who questioned why their school had a vice principal but without a principal.

== Episodes ==
=== Season 1 (2000–01) ===
No.	Title	Written by	Original release date
1	"Inherit the Wheeled"	Andrew Nicholls and Darrell Vickers	October 5, 2000 (CAN); October 24, 2000 (U.S.)
Fearing for his safety, the school forbids Pelswick from going on a class camping trip, even though he correctly points out that "I'm the only kid who can't get accidentally paralyzed!".
2	"I Won't Run, Don't Ask Me"	Darwin Vickers	October 26, 2000
Unable to threaten Pelswick physically, Boyd decides to humiliate him on a whole different level—by nominating him for school president.
3	"Brain Suckers of Skuldeth 5"	Alan Daniels	November 2, 2000
Ace and Goon lure Pelswick into participating in the latest craze, the Brain Suckers trading card game. Soon Pelswick is totally hooked—and Boyd has the one ultra-rare card Pelswick would do anything to get.
4	"Me, Myself and Irate"	Andrew Nicholls, Darrell Vickers & Leonard Dick	November 9, 2000
Pelswick tries to avoid the humiliation of having Gram-Gram deliver a guest lecture at school.
5	"Draw!"	Todd Thicke	November 16, 2000
Pelswick's anonymously drawn cartoon is banned from the school newspaper, leading to a suspension for editor Julie when she won't reveal who drew it.
6	"'NTalented"	Todd Thicke	November 23, 2000
A pre-packaged boy band has all the girls swooning. Pelswick, meanwhile, desperately tries to hate the band, but to his horror finds that he actually kinda likes their music. Note: The episode's title is a play-on for the band *NSYNC.
7	"Assault and a Battery"	Darwin Vickers & Todd Thicke	November 30, 2000
Pelswick and Boyd build a chili-powered battery that ends up turning Pelswick's wheelchair into a 50-mph menace.
8	"The Wheel World"	Todd Thicke & Alan Daniels	December 7, 2000
A camera crew invades the Eggert household when a producer sees Pelswick as the ideal subject for a reality-based TV show.
9	"David and Goonliath"	Leonard Dick & Darwin Vickers	December 7, 2000
Despite a noticeable lack of talent, Goon becomes a professional wrestler—and Pelswick must figure out a way to keep him from getting slaughtered in the ring.
10	"Spring Broken"	Jennifer Pertsch	December 22, 2000
Ace, Goon and the Eggert family head off to Camp Self-Esteemawa for Spring Break...but the camp's determinedly non-competitive atmosphere prevents anyone from having fun.
11	"Transmission Impossible"	Kenn Scott & John Pellatt	December 29, 2000
When Bayview's only rock-and-roll radio station changes its format to all-news, Pelswick opens a pirate rock music station of his own—one that quickly begins consuming all his time and energy.
12	"Blink and You're at 182"	Andrew Nicholls & Darrell Vickers	April 8, 2001
The school is thrown into an uproar when a website publishes a list of students in order of popularity. Note: The episode's title is a play-on for the band Blink-182.
13	"Nursing Home Alone"	John Pellatt, Kenn Scott & Darwin Vickers	April 15, 2001
Gram-Gram and her friends decide to check into a shady nursing home without even saying good-bye to their families. It's up to a bewildered Pelswick to organize a rescue mission while simultaneously planning a surprise party for Quentin.

=== Season 2 (2001–02) ===
No.	Title	Written by	Original release date
14	"Eggertggedon"	Andrew Nicholls and Darrell Vickers	October 3, 2001
All of Bayview starts panicking when it appears that a nuclear-powered space station is going to plunge through the atmosphere and destroy the town.
15	"Wheeldini"	Andrew Nicholls & Darrell Vickers	October 10, 2001
The mayor of Bayview somehow manages to lose all of the town's money, so he hires a magician to find it. Though it's obvious the magician is a sham, no one but Pelswick realizes this. Meanwhile, Gram-Gram and Agnes go searching for the missing money on their own, with some help from a mule.
16	"The Birdboy of Alcatraz"	Darwin Vickers	October 17, 2001
Pelswick is deemed terminally uncool when he takes up birdwatching to impress Julie. Meanwhile, Gram-Gram and Agnes get jobs as store detectives, and a trainee guardian angel takes over for Mr. Jimmy.
17	"Boyd, Here Comes the Flood"	Christian Murray & Mary-Colin Chisholm	October 24, 2001
Substitute teacher Gram-Gram spins tales about the Bayview flood of 1921 in order to impress Pelswick's class, little dreaming of the disastrous consequences that will follow.
18	"It Must Be the Shoes"	Steven Sullivan	October 31, 2001
Basketball fever sweeps Bayview as Pelswick considers trying out for the school basketball team, Sandra and Julie try to organize a girls' team, and Quentin tutors Boyd and his gang so that they can remain eligible to play.
19	"Oh Bully, Where Art Thou?"	Andrew Nicholls & Darrell Vickers	November 7, 2001
Pelswick enters the Paraquest Games for handicapped athletes, and is surprised to find that Boyd is his chief competitor. Meanwhile, Julie and Sandra try to save a tree.
20	"The Case of the Filchered Files"	Darwin Vickers	November 14, 2001
The Eggert family are forced to scrimp and save when Quentin loses his job; Alcatraz Junior High celebrates its 75th anniversary.
21	"Pelswick on a String"	John Mein	November 21, 2001
A decidedly flaky therapist forces the students in Pelswick's class to build marionettes in their own self-images as a therapeutic exercise. When Pelswick refuses to include a wheelchair as part of his self-image puppet, he's deemed to be deliberately undermining the therapy, and is suspended until he can put his puppet on a wheelchair.
22	"Shall We Dance?"	Al Schwartz	November 28, 2001
Pelswick goes on a blind date with a girl who doesn't know about his wheelchair. When he discovers that his date loves dancing, he goes to extreme lengths to keep her from finding out that he's paralyzed from the waist down.
23	"A Rap and a Hard Place"	Christian Murray & Mary-Colin Chisholm	December 5, 2001
Julie tries to shake everyone out of their apathy by forming a band; Sandra obsesses on the healing powers of yellow boots; Gram-Gram and Agnes go gambling.
24	"Hear No Evil, P.C. No Evil"	Andrew Nicholls & Darwin Vickers	September 20, 2002
Quentin's politically correct new girlfriend wins over everyone in the Eggert family except Pelswick.
25	"Kick Me Kate"	Andrew Nicholls & Darwin Vickers	September 27, 2002
Pelswick tries to get Kate's new boyfriend to stand up for himself; Julie gets increasingly frustrated with Sandra's outrageous clothing; Gram-Gram and Agnes go on dates.
26	"Invasion of the Buddy Snatchers"	Darwin Vickers	November 15, 2002
Almost everyone in town gets caught up in a bizarre pyramid scheme to sell laundry detergent. The only exceptions are Julie and Sandra (who are too busy embarking on a recycling drive of truly epic proportions) and poor Pelswick, who, as usual, is trying to be the voice of reason amidst all the chaos.

== Broadcast and home media ==
The show aired in reruns on CBS during the Nick on CBS block from September 14 to November 23, 2002, and on Nick's digital spinoff Nicktoons from May 2002 to early 2005. In 2004, a poll on Funimation's website revealed that they held the DVD rights to Pelswick, but failed to materialize. Years later, the show was made available on streaming services such as Tubi and Pluto TV. The show airs in reruns on Adult Swim in Canada as of early 2021.

== See also ==
- John Callahan's Quads! – Another Nelvana show created by John Callahan.
