= John Callahan (cartoonist) =

American cartoonist and musician

- Born: John Michael Callahan; February 5, 1951; Portland, Oregon, U.S.
- Died: July 24, 2010 (aged 59); Portland, Oregon, U.S.
- Occupations: Cartoonist; artist; musician
- Website: Archived

John Michael Callahan (February 5, 1951 – July 24, 2010) was an American cartoonist, artist, and musician. His quadriplegia drove both his rough artistic style and much of his frequently dark content.

== Accident and career ==
Callahan became a quadriplegic in a drunk driving crash as a passenger in 1972 at age 21. The accident happened in Callahan's car, which was being driven by a man he did not know well.

Following this, Callahan became a cartoonist, drawing by clutching a pen between both hands, having regained partial use of his upper body. His visual artistic style was simple and often rough, although still legible.

Callahan's cartoons dealt with subjects often considered taboo, including disabilities and disease. His black humor may be exemplified by the title of his "quasi-memoir", Will the Real John Callahan Please Stand Up? The subject matter and treatment of his cartoons share something with the work of Charles Addams, Gahan Wilson, and especially Charles Rodrigues, although they are much more aggressive than even the Playboy cartoons by these cartoonists.

From 1983 until his death 27 years later, Callahan's work appeared in the Portland newspaper Willamette Week. The controversial nature of his cartoons occasionally led to boycotts and protests against the paper.

By 1992, however, his cartoons were syndicated in more than 40 newspapers, and two books of his cartoon compilations had been published, Do Not Disturb Any Further and Digesting the Child Within.

Callahan scoffed at the reactions of critics who labeled his work politically incorrect, while delighting in the positive reactions he received from fans with disabilities. "My only compass for whether I've gone too far is the reaction I get from people in wheelchairs, or with hooks for hands," Callahan said. "Like me, they are fed up with people who presume to speak for the disabled. All the pity and the patronizing. That's what is truly detestable."

Two animated cartoon series have been based on Callahan's cartoons, both produced by the Canada-based Nelvana: Pelswick (on CBC Television) (a children's show about a 13 year old who uses a wheelchair) and Quads! (on Teletoon) (about a group of disabled housemates).

Friends said Callahan realized that his cartooning was a form of emotional venting, which led him to pursue a master's degree in counseling at Portland State University. However, his deteriorating health prevented him from finishing his first term.

In 2005, Dutch filmmaker Simone de Vries directed a documentary about Callahan titled Raak me waar ik voelen kan (English: Touch Me Where I Can Feel).

Callahan died on July 24, 2010, following surgery for chronic bed sores. His brother stated the causes of his death were complications of quadriplegia and respiratory problems. He was 59 years old.

A biographical film, Don't Worry, He Won't Get Far on Foot directed by Gus Van Sant and starring Joaquin Phoenix, based on Callahan's memoir of the same name, was posthumously released in 2018; it primarily focused on his journey to sobriety through Alcoholics Anonymous.

== Other careers ==
=== Graphic art ===
Callahan worked on nudes and a portrait project, which was shown in several galleries throughout its progression.

=== Songwriting ===
Callahan was also a songwriter. He released a CD, Purple Winos in the Rain, in 2006. He wrote and composed his own lyrics, and sang and played the harmonica and ukulele. The record was released on BoneClone Records and produced by blues musician Terry Robb, who also plays guitar accompaniment on several tracks, with a special cameo appearance by Tom Waits. Callahan personally illustrated the album cover. Posthumously, in 2018, track 14, "Texas When You Go", a duet recording of Callahan and Robb, was included in the film score for Don't Worry, He Won't Get Far on Foot.

The Independent called his songs "beautiful, but dark". He wrote all the music and lyrics himself and was backed up by many notable musicians. A Dutch film crew recorded the studio sessions in which Callahan played a simplified piano version of "Roll Away the Day".

== Personal life ==
John Callahan was adopted as an infant and grew up in The Dalles. His adoptive parents later had five biological children. He attended a Roman Catholic elementary school, St Mary's Academy, and graduated from a public high school. According to his memoir, Don't Worry, He Won't Get Far on Foot, the nun, Sister Joseph of Mary, chose him as her surrogate child and insisted he sit with her at recess and not play with the other children, constantly telling him how special he was. In his book, Callahan said, "I can imagine myself sitting on that bench and thinking Boy, this will be called child molestation twenty years from now." He began drinking at the age of 12. "I used the alcohol to hide the pain of the abuse," Callahan said.

After the car accident that caused his spinal cord injury, he went through extensive rehabilitation. At age 27, he gave up drinking alcohol. He made his home in Portland, Oregon, becoming a familiar sight to the streets in his motorized wheelchair.

== Legacy ==
The Legacy Good Samaritan Medical Center in Portland, where he was a patient, and later a volunteer helping the newly paralyzed move forward with their lives, has a memorial garden featuring engravings of 50 of his cartoons set amid spiky plants.
