= Iggy Arbuckle =

Television series

- The main cast of the show: (Clockwise from top) The Great Bamzeani, Robear, Catfish Stu, Robert, Jiggers, Iggy Arbuckle, Spiff, Zoop and Kira. (Background) Mooseknuckle.
- Genre: Animated sitcom
- Created by: Guy Vasilovich
- Developed by: Myra Fried; Steve Wright; Shelley Hoffman; Robert Pincombe
- Written by: (5 or more episodes); Myra Fried; Steve Wright; Karen Moonah; Terry Saltsman; Kenn Scott
- Voices of: Jonathan Wilson; David Berni; James Rankin; Derek McGrath; Stephanie Milo; Stephanie Anne Mills; Novie Edwards; Neil Crone; Patrick McKenna
- Theme music composer: Marvin Dolgay; David Matheson
- Opening theme: "Iggy Arbuckle!"
- Composers: Steve D'Angelo; Terry Tompkins; Doug Pennock
- Countries of origin: United States; Canada
- Original language: English
- No. of seasons: 1
- No. of episodes: 26

Production
- Executive producers: Donna Friedman Meir; Noreen Halpern; John Morayniss; Audrey Velichka
- Producer: Suzanne Berger
- Running time: 22 minutes
- Production companies: Teletoon; C.O.R.E. Toons; National Geographic Kids Entertainment; Blueprint Entertainment

Original release
- Network: Animania HD (United States); Teletoon (Canada)
- Release: June 29 – October 10, 2007

Iggy Arbuckle is an animated sitcom created by Guy Vasilovich, which aired on Teletoon in Canada from June 29 to October 10, 2007. Based on a comic strip from National Geographic Kids, the series follows the adventures of the titular character Iggy Arbuckle, a pig who happens to be a forest ranger, known in the series as a "Pig Ranger", and his best friend, a beaver named Jiggers. The plot involves Iggy's attempts to protect the environmental structure of the Kookamunga National Park, a fictional national park that takes place in a world of anthropomorphic animals. The series was produced by Blueprint Entertainment, in association with C.O.R.E. Toons and National Geographic Kids. Worldwide, it was distributed by Oasis International, and is now distributed by Hasbro Entertainment after they bought Entertainment One's library.

The series also aired in Australia on ABC Kids, in the UK on Jetix, and on Pop. Oasis International, the Canadian distributor, also licensed the series to channels such as Cartoon Network (in Korea, Southeast Asia, India, and the Philippines) and Canal+ and TPS in France. It was also broadcast on Saturday mornings on Toonattik on ITV and CITV, and weekday mornings on Action Stations on ITV4 and CITV. A total of 26 episodes were produced.

== Plot ==
Set in a fictional national park known as the "Kookamunga" (or "the Kook" for short; the park's full name is likely a pun on the Cucamonga Valley in California), full with animals and creatures. The series follows Iggy Arbuckle, a pig forest ranger. He is accompanied by his beaver friend Jiggers, who is the only other canonical Pig Ranger in the show.

Iggy's nemesis is Stu, a catfish, who is always trying to use the Kookamunga to obtain wealth with the ferret brothers. Most of the stories revolve around Iggy and Jiggers' efforts to save the park's ecosystem from Catfish Stu.

== Recurring locations ==
The most prominent locations in the park include a volcano called Mount Kaboom, which Jiggers is constantly afraid will erupt, despite Iggy saying it has been dormant for centuries. The first story in the debut episode focused on this matter. Three other recurring places are a lake called Gottalottawatta, in which character Catfish Stu frequently dwells, an Iceland called Brainfreeze and a town called Mooseknuckle.

== Production ==
Iggy Arbuckle began as a comic strip entitled Iggy Arbuckle: Nature Freak! that premiered in National Geographic Kids in the June 2004 issue. To date, this was the only issue of the comic strip; in which the characters Iggy Arbuckle, Jiggers and Zoop made their first appearances. The plot involved Iggy and Jiggers trying to find an acorn so Iggy could make an acorn squash pie for Zoop as a birthday present.

Series creator Guy Vasilovich (director of Kangaroo Jack: G'Day U.S.A.!, writer for Moville Mysteries and production designer for Hey Arnold!: The Movie), based the series loosely on his childhood experiences while living in Tomahawk, Wisconsin.

On April 11, 2005, Oasis International, Blueprint Entertainment and Teletoon announced that they were co-producing an animated series based on the comic. The series would be targeted at children ages 6 to 11 and feature twenty-six episodes each comprising two eleven-minute sub-episodes. The animation was done entirely in Flash, with over 100 workers involved in the series' creation. National Geographic holds the distribution rights for the series in the United States, while Blueprint holds the global rights. Jetix Europe acquired the European home video distribution and television broadcast rights to the series in February 2007.

In January 2008, Oasis International sold the distribution rights of the series to Canal+ and TPS in France, to ABC in Australia, and to the variants of Cartoon Network in Southeast Asia, Korea, the Philippines, Australia and India. The series was licensed for US broadcast by Animania HD, and is currently licensed for distribution in a total of seventy territories.

== Characters ==
Iggy Arbuckle and Jiggers

The characters in the show are drawn as animal species, including many types of mammals, reptiles, birds, fish, and even insects. Rather than referring to the male characters as "men" and the females as "women" in the appropriate contexts, the characters refer to each other by their species (though the words "lady/ladies," "gentleman/men," "girls," and "boys" exist in their vocabulary). The wild animals and the anthropomorphized characters understand each other quite well, and the wild ones seem quite intelligent.

A gag in the series is that whenever a character gets conked on the head, bluebirds start flying around their heads. When the character comes to, they fly away.

== Episodes ==
No.	Title	Original release date
1	"Iggy vs. the Volcano"	June 29, 2007
1	"A Dip in the Pole"	June 29, 2007
Iggy and Jiggers must stop Mount Kaboom from erupting. later, they try to prove that Admiral "Brrrrrd" really did sail to the Norse Pole.
2	"The Things We Do for Mud"	July 1, 2007
2	"How Much Wood Can a Wood Pecker Peck?"	July 1, 2007
Catfish Stu tries to become a Pig Ranger in order to find out where "Miracle Mud" comes from. Iggy and the gang try to save the Great Bamzeani from being pecked to dust by woodpeckers.
3	"The Beaver Who Would be King"	July 3, 2007
3	"I Am Iggy, Hear Me Snore"	July 3, 2007
Jiggers becomes the King of the Lost Warthog tribe. Iggy must cease his snoring or else cease his residence in the Kookamunga.
4	"Idle Worship"	July 10, 2007
4	"There's Something about Berries"	July 10, 2007
Iggy gives a famous nature explorer a tour of the Kookamunga. later, he tries to find out how Stu is behind the disappearance of the Juniper berry bushes.
5	"Yawny Come Lately"	July 12, 2007
5	"Petition Impossible"	July 12, 2007
It's Yawny Yump-A-Lot Day, and Yawny's angry spirit is forcing the town to do something for him, or else become the world's largest totem pole. Iggy and Jiggers must get 200 signatures in a petition before a construction crew builds a highway all along the Kookamunga.
6	"Paradise Found"	July 19, 2007
6	"Luck Before You Leap"	July 19, 2007
Iggy and Jiggers seek after the Legendary Lost City of the Kookamunga. Iggy frantically tries to figure out what happened to his good luck toothpick.
7	"The Fish Who Came for Dinner"	July 21, 2007
7	"Courage Under Fur"	July 21, 2007
Temporarily banned from his house for the sake of a crane family, Catfish Stu and the ferrets stay at Iggy's house for a month. Zoop hypnotizes Jiggers so he can overcome his fear of spiders.
8	"Lights, Camera, Distraction!"	July 29, 2007
8	"Fish and Chip off the Old Block"	July 29, 2007
A movie director is trying to produce a film in the Kookamunga. A bump on the noggin leads Iggy to believe Catfish Stu is his father.
9	"Any Friend of Yours"	August 1, 2007
9	"Miner Misfortunes"	August 1, 2007
Jiggers and Kira develop an attraction, and Jiggers begins to ignore Iggy. In order to stop Catfish Stu from tearing the Kook apart, the gang must bring a legendary curse to life.
10	"The Way of the Skunk"	August 5, 2007
10	"I Fought the Laundromat"	August 5, 2007
Spiff quits his job as a street cleaner after a robot takes over. Iggy and Jiggers suspect Catfish Stu is behind Old Reliable's sudden inability to erupt.
11	"A Whale of a Tale"	August 10, 2007
11	"Big Toe's Faux Paw"	August 10, 2007
Iggy spies a narwhal, and must stop an evil scientist from capturing it. Iggy and Jiggers argue over whether Big Toe is real... or just another of Catfish Stu's scams.
12	"Prince of the Kookamunga"	August 12, 2007
12	"Voyage to the Bottom of the Lake"	August 12, 2007
A friend of Kira's from the city visits the Kookamunga. Catfish Stu tries to retrieve a ship he believes contains treasure, from the bottom of the lake.
13	"Tower of Beaver"	August 19, 2007
13	"A Bird in the Hoof"	August 19, 2007
Spiff and Zoop can't stop arguing, and it gets in the way of their volunteer work. A back-talking parrot drives all of Mooseknuckle crazy.
14	"Fair is Ferret"	August 20, 2007
14	"The Case of the Messy Marauder"	August 20, 2007
After Iggy saves them repeatedly, the ferrets become his henchmen. A mysterious (and messy) thief keeps taking Zoop's peanuts.
15	"If Pigs could Fly"	August 22, 2007
15	"Xtreme Iggy"	August 22, 2007
Iggy and Jiggers find an abandoned condor egg and try to raise it. Iggy's attempts to protect skiers from avalanches turn him into an extreme sports star.
16	"Resident Weevil"	August 24, 2007
16	"Kook Kook Achoo"	August 24, 2007
A water hyacinth Robear places in Lake Gottalottowatta, for Stu, grows out of control. Jiggers inexplicably gains an allergy to sawdust.
17	"Pig-Coloured Glasses"	August 27, 2007
17	"Art for Iggy's Sake"	August 27, 2007
Jiggers' nephew, Chip, idolizes Iggy. Iggy is depressed because he can't find an art category he fits in with.
18	"Good Scavenger Hunting"	August 29, 2007
18	"Mooseknuckle Unplugged"	August 29, 2007
Iggy and Stu face off in a scavenger hunt. After a power failure, the residents of Mooseknuckle.
19	"Pandamonium"	August 31, 2007
19	"Ghost of a Chance"	August 31, 2007
The gang try to attract more tourists to the Kook. Iggy and Jiggers are driven out of their home by a "ghost".
20	"O Brother, Where art Thou?"	September 5, 2007
20	"Ol' Trusty"	September 5, 2007
Robear "saves" Zoop's life, and she does everything she can to repay him. Stu makes cheap knock-offs of Iggy's pig scout knife to sell to tourists.
21	"Nature's Calling"	September 10, 2007
21	"Honey, I Ate the Bug"	September 10, 2007
The film director returns, this time in hopes of getting indulged in nature. Jiggers believes that he ate Iggy's pet caterpillar.
22	"Sticking Together"	September 12, 2007
22	"Slow Gnus Day"	September 12, 2007
Iggy and Spiff become chained together when one of Jiggers' magic tricks goes wrong. Later, they try to return a herd of wild buffalo (gnus) to the savannah.
23	"Scents and Sensibility"	September 20, 2007
23	"The Great Kookamunga Standoff"	September 20, 2007
Iggy and Jiggers try to make a perfume for Zoop's birthday. Later, they argue over what the theme of the party celebrating the good harvests in the park will be.
24	"The Big Flap"	September 24, 2007
24	"The Unsung Hero"	September 24, 2007
Iggy and Jiggers must save the butterflies from the wind. Iggy and Jiggers enlist Spiff's help in singing for cactuses, because Zoop is sick.
25	"The Kindness of Rangers"	September 30, 2007
25	"Iggy's Family Tree"	September 30, 2007
Catfish Stu's mother, Catfish Stella, visits her son. Iggy tries to save a dying old oak, which has been a part of his family for several generations.
26	"When Iggy Met Jiggers"	October 10, 2007
26	"One Fine Day"	October 10, 2007
Iggy and Jiggers tell Kira about Jiggers' arrival at Mooseknuckle. After discovering the one day off, Iggy wants to do in that day.

== Reception ==
Iggy Arbuckle has been received well in Europe, with Jetix Europe receiving strong sales on the show. In the United Kingdom, its biggest timeslot is among young male viewers. As of Autumn 2008, it ranks among the top shows viewed by European children, in the markets in which Jetix has aired the show.

=== Awards and nominations ===
As of March 2008, the sub-episode "Petition Impossible", of the episode "Yawny Come Lately/Petition Impossible" was among the finalists of the children's programs nominated for the 2008 Canadian Screenwriting Awards. On April 14 the award was given to writer Kenn Scott for the Children/Preschool category. The episode "Idle Worship/There's Something about Berries" won a Gemini award for Best Writing in a Children's Series, during the 23rd anniversary of the Gemini awards. Jonathan Wilson and David Berni, the voices of Iggy and Jiggers, respectively, received a Gemini nomination for Best Individual or Ensemble Performance in an Animated Program or Series, for the same episode, although it lost to Gordon Tootoosis, Raven Brass, Trevor Cameron, Lorne Cardinal, Taylor Cook, Eric Jackson, Andrea Menard, and DerRic Starlight, for The Guardians.

=== Merchandise ===
Promotional online poster for the game.

On November 1, 2007, an online game based on the series, The Great Kookamunga Challenge, was launched. Hosted on the Teletoon web site and created by Zinc Roe Design, the game was an online race in which players explored the Kookamunga National Park in search of 115 "checkpoints." At each checkpoint, they could earn points by playing games, answering trivia questions about the series, or completing group activities. The first players who completed the entire challenge won real-world prizes, including a digital camera and items from National Geographic Kids. The game ran for six weeks.

The first 13 episodes of Iggy Arbuckle were released on DVD in 2007 in Australia. In 2011, Entertainment One began to release all 26 episodes of the series on DVD in all five volumes, available in Canada, and it is spoken in English and French.
