= John Callahan's Quads! =

Canadian-Australian adult animated sitcom (2001–2002)

- The main cast of John Callahan's Quads!.
- Also known as: Quads!
- Genre: Comedy
- Created by: John Callahan
- Developed by: Andrew Nicholls; Darrell Vickers
- Directed by: Steve French; Chris Labonte
- Starring: James Kee; Terri Hawkes; Matthew King; Cliff Saunders; Paul Haddad; Hamish Hughes; Diane Fabian; Marvin Kaye; Maurice Dean Wint; Linda Kash; Corinne Conley
- Opening theme: "My Life Such as It Is"
- Ending theme: "My Life Such as It Is" (Instrumental)
- Composer: John Clifford White
- Countries of origin: Canada; Australia
- No. of seasons: 2
- No. of episodes: 26

Production
- Executive producers: John Callahan; Deborah Levin; Judy Malmgren; John Tatoulis; Michael Hirsh; Patrick Loubert; Clive A. Smith; Scott Dyer
- Running time: 30 minutes (including commercials)
- Production companies: Nelvana Limited; Media World Features Pty. Ltd.

Original release
- Network: The Detour on Teletoon (Canada); SBS (Australia)
- Release: February 2, 2001 – October 19, 2002

Related
- Pelswick

John Callahan's Quads! (or simply Quads!) is an adult animated sitcom produced by Nelvana. It was created by and based upon the work of John Callahan, who also created another Nelvana-produced series, Pelswick. The show aired in 2001 on Teletoon Unleashed! in Canada, SBS in Australia, and in Latin America on Locomotion and Adult Swim. The series was released on YouTube in 2018. Quads! was one of the first shows animated completely using the Macromedia Flash software. 26 episodes were produced.

It was produced by Nelvana and Media World Features, with support from ScreenWest and Lotterywest in association with SBS Independent. It was first aired on Teletoon at Night on 2 February 2001.

When Quads Won't Leave was an early title for the series.

== Characters ==
- Reilly O'Reilly (voiced by James Kee) – The show's main protagonist and antihero. He is paralyzed from the neck down and uses a wheelchair after getting run over by his future neighbor, Mort Bromberg. A lawsuit against Mort yields him a luxury home in Forest Hills, which he invites his friends to live with him in. He is an apathetic and cynical slacker whose incentives in life include fornicating with his girlfriend Franny, drinking, and hatching new get-rich-quick schemes that typically end in disaster.
- Franny (voiced by Terri Hawkes) – Reilly's soulmate, spiritual advisor, lover, and best friend. She appears to be a sexualized love-interest and a stereotypical hippie who is into environmental activism, sexuality, and New Age spiritualism, and abstains from shaving her bodily hair except on special occasions as a special gift to Reilly. She also acts as the moral center of an otherwise amoral and disordered household, as well as a running gag where Franny is a frequent object of lust to perverted men like Blazer, who repeatedly attempts to hit on her.
- Spalding (voiced by Matthew King) – One of the more stable members of the group, he is Reilly's personal caregiver. He is a homosexual with a well-built physique and is originally from Australia. Although well-intentioned, he is a drama queen who craves attention and allows his overt sexuality to get the best of him at times.
- Blazer (voiced by Cliff Saunders) – Having lost his entire body as a result of gambling debts, he has been reduced to a disembodied head mounted on a skateboard for mobility. He is a crude, ill-mannered, and cantankerous pervert who will go to any length to proposition women for even the most obscene sexual favors.
- Lefty (voiced by Paul Haddad) – Formerly a professional masseur, his hands were bitten off after he mistook a wild dog's behind for his client's back. Lefty received a pair of prosthetic metal hooks in place of his hands, which he often has immense difficulty utilizing to perform everyday tasks that require hands. He is an educated and cultured individual who typically finds himself at odds with his housemates, who are in contrast with him, personality-wise.
- Fontaine (voiced by Maurice Dean Wint) – A blind black man with a gentle and caring demeanor. Due to his blindness and trusting nature, he is frequently taken advantage of by the others, especially Reilly and Blazer. In one episode, it is revealed he has an illegitimate son who is also blind.
- Griz (voiced by Hamish Hughes) – A large, disheveled man who speaks with an Irish accent. He runs a dilapidated dive bar infested with rats and cockroaches that the group frequent for their drinking needs. Griz is perpetually drunk and, as a result, prone to fits of alcoholic rage and poor judgment.
- Mort Bromberg (voiced by Marvin Kaye) – The man responsible for running Reilly over with his car, crippling him. Feeling guilty, Mort unwittingly buys Reilly an extravagant mansion next to his own, to the chagrin of his wife Liz, who despises Reilly and his friends. Despite caring for his wife and doing anything he can to please her, he is often met with Liz's callous indifference to his efforts and well-being.
- Liz Bromberg (voiced by Diane Fabian) – Mort's cold-blooded wife. Liz detests Reilly and his friends simply because they are disabled and feels their disadvantaged nature does not gel with the environment of their affluent neighbourhood. She initially tried to have the group evicted, but subsequent episodes revolve around her finding some way to take advantage of them.
- Deborah (voiced by Linda Kash) – The group's physical therapist, who runs a rehabilitation clinic the group frequent for sessions with. She is cheerful and positive, yet addresses the group in a patronizing manner, especially Fontaine.
- Sister Butch (voiced by Corinne Conley) – A Catholic nun who resides in the cathedral next door to Reilly's house and frequently spies on him and his activities using a pair of binoculars. A harsh and vindictive disciplinarian who believes she is doing God's work, she is often seen attempting to proselytize and force her views down the throats of others.

== Episodes ==
=== Season 1 (2001) ===
No.	Title	Written by	Original release date
1	"Maimed Manor"	Andrew Nicholls; Darrell Vickers	2 February 2001
An able-bodied drunk named Reilly finds himself paralyzed after the driver, a local wealthy man named Mort Bromberg, runs him over. To keep from suing him, Mort gives Reilly a cash settlement and a mansion next to Mort and his social-climbing wife, Liz.
2	"Bad Manors"	Todd Thicke	9 February 2001
To raise money to keep the mansion, Reilly and the disabled friends he mocked in the first episode decide to rent out the mansion as a place for parties and conventions.
3	"1-800-GIMP"	Todd Thicke	16 February 2001
Liz Bromberg holds a telethon to raise money for "unfortunate gimps" and ropes in Reilly and his friends.
4	"The Fraud Quad"	Jeremy Hotz; Todd Thicke	23 February 2001
Reilly is jealous of a swarthy, charming, Spanish man who may be faking his disability.
5	"Christmas Holidaze"	Alan Daniels	17 December 2001
Reilly's battle with overcoming his alcoholism is challenged over the Christmas holidays.
6	"Life Wheel 3000"	Ken Cuperus	2 March 2001
Reilly gets a wheelchair that begins to alienate him from his friends and girlfriend, Franny.
7	"Gonad's Faust"	Jennifer Pertsch	9 March 2001
Reilly sells his soul so he can regain his sexual stamina.
8	"Monkey in the Middle"	Vito Viscomi	16 March 2001
Frustrated by his physical limitations following his accident, Reilly buys a helper monkey.
9	"Son's Also Blinded"	Kenn Scott; John Pellatt	23 March 2001
Fontaine (the blind, African-American man of the group) is reunited with the son he never knew he had. Meanwhile, Franny wants to have a baby.
10	"Guinea Pigs"	Todd Thicke	30 March 2001
Reilly, Lefty, Fontaine, Griz, and Blazer get roped into medical experiments run by their counselor, Deborah Golden.
11	"The Unkindest Cut"	Steve French; Brandan Luna	6 April 2001
Reilly accidentally finds himself running for city council against Liz Bromberg. Meanwhile, a beautiful thalidomide woman named Randy moves into the mansion, and Blazer discovers that Randy is transgender.
12	"Fatal Distraction"	Andrea Gillies	13 April 2001
Spaulding (Reilly's homosexual masseur) blackmails Reilly into being his boyfriend so he can catch the eye of his old flame, Bruce. Meanwhile, Griz's (the alcoholic bartender) cowgirl sister comes to town and has her eyes set on Spaulding, not knowing that he's not into women.
13	"Spalding in the Family Way"	Anthony Watt; Brandan Luna	20 April 2001
Spaulding's parents come to visit and uses Reilly's hippie girlfriend, Franny, to trick his parents into thinking he's heterosexual. Meanwhile, Reilly and the rest of his friends help Griz clean up the bar in time for the health inspector's visit.

=== Season 2 (2002) ===
No.	Title	Written by	Original release date
14	"The Church of Reilly"	Ken Cuperus	7 September 2002
When Lefty (the hook-handed chef of the household) cooks an omelette that has an image of The Virgin Mary in it, Reilly sees this as a chance to make money off the religious by transforming into a smooth-talking, faith-healing preacher man, much to the disgust of his former Catholic school nun teacher.
15	"Vacation to Lesbos"	Todd Thicke	8 September 2002
Franny, upset that Reilly takes her for granted, decides to take a break from men and experiment with a woman...only to find herself in too deep when another woman falls for her.
16	"To Slash or Not to Slash"	Jennifer Pertsch	14 September 2002
While pursuing his dream of being a legitimate actor, Lefty soon lands gigs as serial killers in B-horror movies.
17	"Let the Gimp Games Begin"	Hugh Duffy	15 September 2002
Reilly starts his own Olympic Games for people with handicaps and disabilities.
18	"Midnight Cash Cowboy"	Steve Sullivan	21 September 2002
In order to fit in with the sexually experimental women of her country club, Liz Bromberg starts an affair with Fontaine.
19	"Trial and Error"	Jennifer Cowan	22 September 2002
Blazer meets a sexy, wild woman at a rave and takes her home...and things get sticky when the woman is found dead and Blazer is accused of her murder.
20	"Gray Matter"	Ken Cuperus	28 September 2002
A government worker investigates Reilly after discovering that he may be cashing the social security checks of a dead woman.
21	"The Gambling Bug"	Andrea Gillies	29 September 2002
Reilly's gambling addiction hits a new low when he loses the mansion and Franny.
22	"The Magnificent Severed"	Al Schwartz	5 October 2002
Liz Bromberg accuses Reilly of stealing her priceless rubies at the same time Reilly gets an inheritance from an uncle he never knew he had.
23	"Griz Savant"	Dan Signer	6 October 2002
To save the Disability Center from shutting down, Reilly and his friends hold a talent show, but all of them are wildly untalented...except for Griz, who can play the piano like a pro while drunk.
24	"Heaven Can Bite Me"	Brendan Luno & Anthony Watt	12 October 2002
Reilly has a near-death experience after eating a booze-laced brownie.
25	"Cripple Challenge"	Brendan Luno & Anthony Watt	13 October 2002
Reilly and his friends become contestants on a Survivor-esque reality show for the disabled.
26	"Cain and Enabler"	Todd Thicke	19 October 2002
Reilly becomes the sobriety sponsor to an ageing rock star.

== See also ==
- Pelswick – Another Nelvana show created by John Callahan.
