= I Never Learned to Swim: Jill Sobule 1990–2000 =

Greatest hits album by Jill Sobule
- Released: March 20, 2001
- Genre: Folk-pop
- Length: 52:09
- Label: Beyond

Professional ratings
Review scores
| Source | Rating |
|---|---|
| Allmusic | 4/5 stars |

I Never Learned To Swim: Jill Sobule 1990–2000 is a Greatest Hits record released in 2001 by Jill Sobule. The compilation featured a cover of the Laura Nyro song "Stoned Soul Picnic" and two other new tracks: "Big Shoes" and "Smoke Dreams." This record differs from traditional greatest hits compilations in that five of the nine singles Sobule had released at that point were not included. Most notably absent was the hit "Supermodel" from the soundtrack of the Alicia Silverstone film Clueless.

== Track listing ==
1. "Stoned Soul Picnic" (Laura Nyro) – 4:06
2. "When My Ship Comes In" (Eaton, Marvin Gaye, Ivy Jo Hunter, Sobule) – 3:39
3. "Resistance Song" (Sobule) – 2:57
4. "Houdini's Box" (Eaton, Sobule) – 4:01
5. "Claire" (Eaton, Sobule) – 3:39
6. "Big Shoes" (Richard Barone, Sobule) – 2:43
7. "Bitter" (Barone, Sobule) – 3:22
8. "Mexican Wrestler" (Eaton, Sobule) – 4:16
9. "Margaret" (Holland, Sobule) – 3:11
10. "Heroes" (Eaton, Sobule) – 2:57
11. "Karen by Night" (Eaton, Sobule) – 3:55
12. "I Kissed a Girl" (Eaton, Sobule) – 3:11
13. "Love Is Never Equal" (Eaton, Sobule) – 3:56
14. "Pilar (Things Here Are Different)” (Sobule) – 3:21
15. "Smoke Dreams" (Eaton, Sobule) – 3:54
