= Jill Sobule (album) =

Studio album by Jill Sobule
- Released: April 7, 1995
- Recorded: Alex the Great Recording; Nashville, Tennessee
- Length: 46:08
- Label: Atlantic; Lava
- Producer: Brad Jones; Robin Eaton

Jill Sobule chronology
| Things Here Are Different (1990) | Jill Sobule (1995) | Happy Town (1997) |

Singles from Jill Sobule
- 1. "I Kissed a Girl" Released: May 2, 1995; 2. "Supermodel" Released: July 10, 1995

Jill Sobule is the second album by the American singer-songwriter Jill Sobule, released on April 7, 1995. The disc contained the singles "Good Person Inside", "Supermodel" and "I Kissed a Girl". The album sold 100,000 copies in the US, making it her most commercially successful record.

Professional ratings
Review scores
| Source | Rating |
|---|---|
| AllMusic | 3/5 stars |
| Entertainment Weekly | A– |
| Los Angeles Times | 3/4 stars |
| The New York Times | (favorable) |
| The Village Voice | (choice cut) |

== Track listing ==
All tracks are written by Jill Sobule & Robin Eaton, except as noted.

| No. | Title | Writer(s) | Length |
|---|---|---|---|
| 1. | "Good Person Inside" | Sobule | 3:12 |
| 2. | "Margaret" | Sobule, Nicky Holland | 3:18 |
| 3. | "(Theme From) The Girl in the Affair" | Sobule | 3:53 |
| 4. | "Karen by Night" | | 3:58 |
| 5. | "Houdini's Box" | | 4:00 |
| 6. | "Trains" | | 3:44 |
| 7. | "I Kissed a Girl" | | 3:13 |
| 8. | "The Jig Is Up" | | 4:14 |
| 9. | "Resistance Song" | Sobule | 2:59 |
| 10. | "Supermodel" | David Baerwald, David Kitay, Brian MacLeod, Kristen Vigard | 3:08 |
| 11. | "The Couple on the Street" | | 3:24 |
| 12. | "Vrbana Bridge" | | 4:16 |
| 13. | "Now That I Don't Have You" | | 3:49 |

The first release of the album does not contain "Supermodel". After "Supermodel" appeared on the Clueless film soundtrack and was released as a single, the album was reissued with the song.

== Personnel ==
- Jill Sobule – guitar, sound effects, vocals, background vocals, tambo drums
- Sam Bacco – percussion, tympani
- Richard Barone – vocals, background vocals
- Pat Bergeson – harmonica
- J.D. Blair – snare drums
- Chris Carmichael – violin, cello
- Sue Davis – background vocals
- Robin Eaton – bass guitar, guitar, vocals, background vocals
- Buddy Emmons – pedal steel guitar
- Mac Gayden – banjo
- Byron House – bass guitar
- Brad Jones – organ, synthesizer, bass guitar, flute, guitar, mandolin, piano, keyboards
- Wayne Kramer – bass guitar
- Craig Krampf – drums
- Viktor Krauss – bass guitar
- Kenny Malone – percussion, drums
- Jerry Dale McFadden – accordion, sound effects
- Eric Moon – keyboards
- Al Perkins – pedal steel guitar
- Ross Rice – drums, electric piano
- Kirby Shelstad – drums, talking drum
- Jim Wizniewski – flute

Production

- Production: Brad Jones & Robin Eaton
- Engineering: Brad Jones
- Mixing: Roger Moutenot
- Mastering: Greg Calbi

== Charts ==
Album

| Year | Chart | Position |
|---|---|---|
| 1995 | Heatseekers | 11 |

Singles

| Year | Single | Chart | Position |
|---|---|---|---|
| 1995 | "I Kissed a Girl" | Modern Rock Tracks | 20 |
| 1995 | "I Kissed a Girl" | Billboard Hot 100 | 67 |
| 1995 | "I Kissed a Girl" | Australian ARIA Singles Chart | 36 |
| 1996 | "Supermodel" | Australian ARIA Singles Chart | 53 |
