= Underdog Victorious =

Studio album by Jill Sobule
- Released: September 7, 2004
- Length: 42:04
- Label: Artemis
- Producer: Robin Eaton, Brad Jones, Roger Moutenot

Jill Sobule chronology
The Folk Years 2003–2003 (2004)	Underdog Victorious (2004)	California Years (2009)

Professional ratings
Review scores
Source	Rating
AllMusic	link
Robert Christgau	link
No Depression	(favorable) link

Underdog Victorious is the sixth studio album by American singer-songwriter Jill Sobule, released in 2004. (see 2004 in music). As of February 2005, the album had sold 7,300 copies. Her first record in four years, the album contains the single "Cinnamon Park" (which borrows the piano hook of the 1972 single "Saturday in the Park" from the band Chicago).

The CD contains a hidden track, "I Saw a Cop."

"Nothing Natural" appeared on an episode of the FX drama series Nip/Tuck, and a live, acoustic rendition of "Freshman" appeared in the film Mind the Gap.

Tim Cain of the Herald & Review named the album the 3rd best of 2004.

== Track listing ==
1. "Freshman" (Eaton, Sobule) – 2:21
2. "Jetpack" (Eaton, Sobule) – 3:03
3. "Cinnamon Park" (Eaton, Lamm, Sobule) – 3:23
4. "Tender Love" (Demain, Eaton, Sobule) – 2:46
5. "Underdog Victorious" (Eaton, Sobule) – 3:31
6. "Under the Disco Ball" (Sobule) – 1:31
7. "The Last Line" (Eaton, Sobule) – 3:56
8. "Tel Aviv" (Eaton, Sobule) – 3:32
9. "Joey" (Demain, Sobule) – 3:55
10. "Nothing Natural" (Eaton, Sobule) – 2:28
11. "Angel/Asshole" (Sobule) – 2:59
12. "Strawberry Gloss" (Sobule) – 3:45
13. "Thank Misery" (Eaton, Sobule) – 2:16
14. "I Saw a Cop" [hidden track] (Sobule) – 2:31
15. "Almost Fell" [Borders Bonus Track] – 3:33

== Personnel ==
- Jill Sobule – organ, guitar, drums, sound effects, Moog synthesizer, omnichord, Casio
- Patrick Buchanon – guitar
- Rob Burger – piano, Casio
- Chris Carmichael – violin, viola
- Bill DeMain – electric piano, background vocals
- Dennis Diken – drums
- Robin Eaton – bass guitar, harmonica, background vocals
- Mickey Grimm – percussion, drums
- David Henry – cello
- Jim Hoke – clarinet, flute
- Brad Jones – organ, bass, piano, rhythm guitar, electric piano
- Will Kimbrough – slide guitar
- Marykate O'Neil – background vocals
- Al Perkins – pedal steel
- Michael Rhodes – bass
- Ross Rice – piano
- Neal Rosengarden – trumpet, classical guitar

Production

- Producers: Robin Eaton, Brad Jones, Roger Moutenot
- Engineer: Chris Woods
- Mastering: Jim DeMain
