= Sassy (magazine) =

American general interest teen magazine

- Categories: Teen
- Frequency: Monthly
- Publisher: Matilda Publications (1988–89), Lang Communications (1989–1994)
- First issue: March 1988
- Final issue: 1996
- Country: United States
- Language: English
- ISSN: 0899-9953

Sassy magazine was a general interest teen magazine aimed at young women. Now defunct, it covered a wide variety of topics, and was intended as a feminist counterpoint to Seventeen and YM magazines. Sassy existed between 1988 and 1996.

== History and profile ==
The magazine was founded in March 1988 by an Australian feminist, Sandra Yates, CEO of Matilda Publications, who based it on the teen magazine Dolly. Women Aglow, an evangelical women's group, boycotted Sassy due to its content about sexuality immediately following its start.

== Editorial staff ==
Sassy's founding editor was Jane Pratt. The magazine's original main writers were referred to by Pratt as "Sex" (Karen Catchpole), "Drugs" (Catherine Gysin), and "Rock 'n Roll" (Christina Kelly) because of the topics they covered. Executive editor Mary Kaye Schilling became editor-in-chief in 1990, when Pratt went on to host a daytime talk show. When Schilling left, Christina Kelly was promoted to editor and remained in that position until the magazine's end. Kelly hired Erin Smith of Bratmobile as her intern in 1991. The fashion department was headed by Mary Clarke, Jacinta Dobson, and Andrea Lee Linett, who discovered Chloë Sevigny on the street and hired her as an intern. The distinctive look of the magazine was created by Cheryl Collins, who had worked at Australia's Dolly. When Collins left, Schilling hired Noel Claro to art direct the magazine.

== Publishers ==
Sassy was first published in March 1988 in the United States by Matilda Publications with a circulation of 250,000. It was acquired by Lang Communications in October 1989, at which point its circulation was 450,000. Petersen Publishing officially took over with the February–March 1995 issue, and its editorial offices were moved to Los Angeles from New York City. It then stopped publishing as its own title in 1996, when editorial sections (and staff) of Sassy were absorbed into another magazine published by Petersen called 'Teen beginning with the January 1997 issue.

== Dirt magazine ==
In 1992, Sassy spun off a short-lived title for teen boys called Dirt: Son of Sassy. It was created by Mark Lewman (words), Andy Jenkins (art direction) and Spike Jonze (photos), who went on to direct music videos and feature films. They were collectively known as "the Master Cluster." According to Canadian author Douglas Coupland, "Dirt was a funny and smart magazine for young people".

== Reader-produced issues ==
Sassy anticipated "crowd sourced" content by over a decade, starting with their "every single little thing in this issue is reader-produced" December 1990 issue. Originally conceived by Alan Goodman's and Fred Seibert's Fred/Alan Inc., Sassy advertising agency.

== Sassiest Boy in America ==
Sassy conducted an annual search for the Sassiest Girl in America, and in 1990, Sassy magazine conducted a search for the Sassiest Boy in America. Over 150 entries were received, with the eventual winner being Ian Svenonius of Nation of Ulysses. In the story highlighting his selection, Pratt states, "He's going to be a big deal. I'm sure he will be and we're going to be so proud that we were the first ones to discover him." However, it was discovered that Svenonius wasn't a "boy" at all, but rather lied about his age, as he was 22 at the time of his selection—too old, per contest rules. He was allowed to retain his title.

== Chia Pet ==
Sassy's in-house band was named after the Chia Pet, with various members from the editorial staff, including Jane Pratt on violin, Mary Kaye Schilling and Christina Kelly on vocals, Kelly's then-husband Robert Weeks on guitar, her then-sister-in-law (and Sassy writer) Jessica Vitkus Weeks on bass guitar, Mary Ann Marshall (also a Sassy scribe) on drums. Karen Catchpole lent co-lead vocals to some songs including "Hey Baby" and "Don't You Want Me Baby". The band once opened for The Lemonheads at iconic now-closed New York City rock club CBGB.

=== Releases ===
- Hey Baby — CD single of original songs
1. "Hey Baby"
2. "Lunch"
3. "Blind Date"
- Tannis Root Presents: Freedom Of Choice — various-artists pro-choice fundraising CD of 80s cover songs

16. "Don't You Want Me Baby"

== Book: How Sassy Changed My Life ==
In April 2007, Faber and Faber released a tribute to and history of Sassy by former Teen Vogue editor Kara Jesella and Marisa Meltzer called How Sassy Changed My Life: A Love Letter to the Greatest Teen Magazine of All Time. The book recounts the magazine's rise and fall; its unusual appeal to both men and women, teenagers and adults; and its influence on mainstream as well as alternative women's magazines. It includes interviews with staffers and fans.

== In popular culture ==
Jill Sobule's "Supermodel" features several lines lifted from letter to the editors printed in Sassy.

The podcast Listen to Sassy, hosted by Pamela Ribon, Tara Ariano, and David T. Cole (all formerly of Television Without Pity), has since 2021 discussed each issue of Sassy in detail.

== See also ==
- Jane magazine
- Dolly magazine
- "Sassy's Sassiest Boys"
