= Happy Town =

Happy Town may refer to:

- Happy Town (TV series), a 2010 television series on ABC
- Happy Town (album), a 1997 album by Jill Sobule
- Happy Town (musical), a 1959 Broadway musical
- Happy Town (game), a 2019 video game
