= Al Perkins =

American guitarist (born 1944)

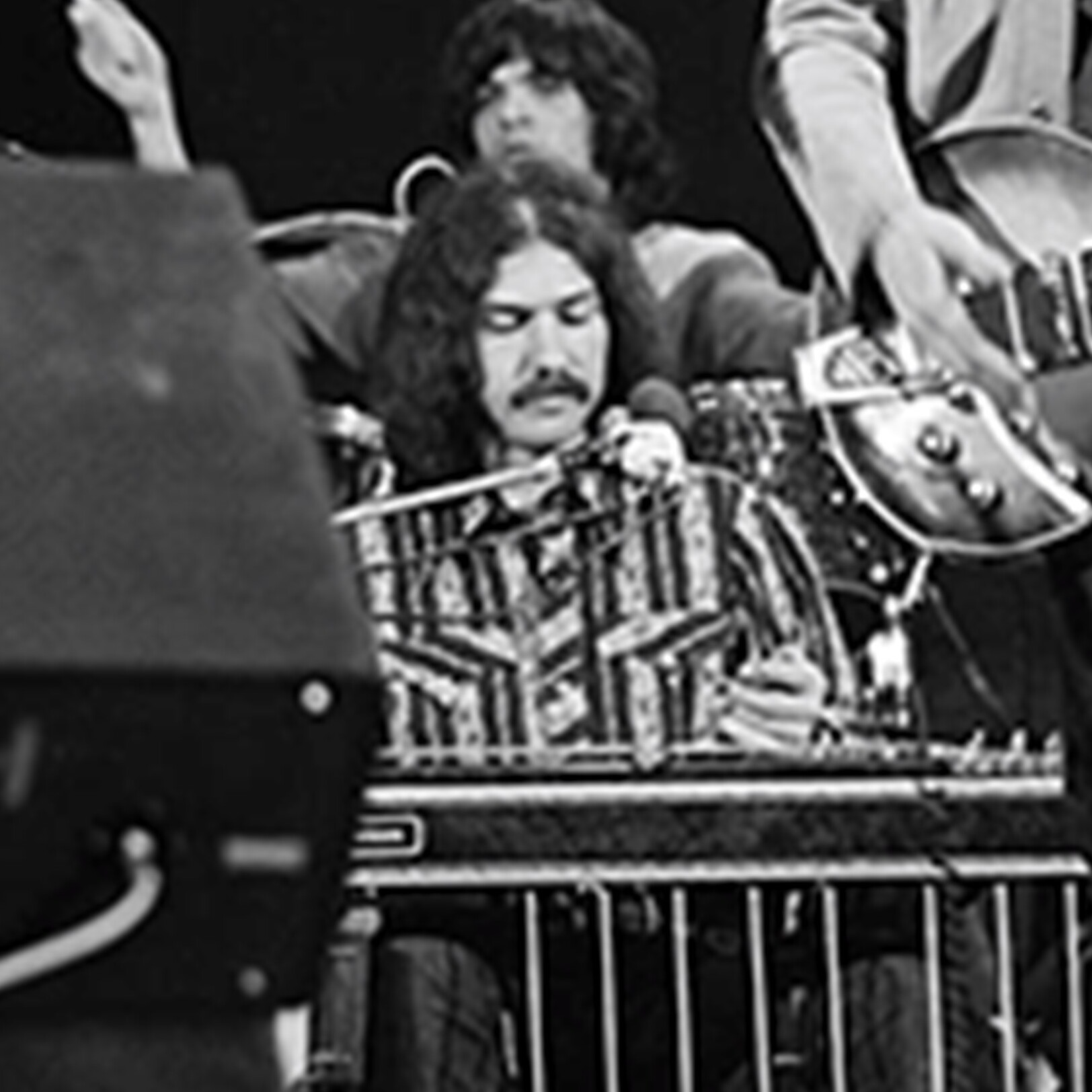
- Perkins with Manassas in 1972

Background information
- Born: Albert Perkins; January 18, 1944 (age 82); De Kalb, Texas, U.S.
- Genres: Folk; bluegrass; rock; country rock; country; contemporary Christian
- Occupations: Musician; singer-songwriter; producer
- Instruments: Pedal steel guitar; guitar; Dobro; banjo; vocals
- Years active: 1953–present
- Website: alperkinsmusic.com

Al Perkins (born January 18, 1944) is an American guitarist known primarily for his steel guitar work. The Gibson guitar company called Perkins "the world's most influential Dobro player" and began producing an "Al Perkins Signature" Dobro in 2001—designed and autographed by Perkins.

== Early years ==
Al Perkins was born and raised in Texas and learned to play Hawaiian steel guitar at the age of 9. In the 1950s Perkins was considered a child prodigy, playing with regional country and western bands, appearing on TV/radio, and winning several talent contests. In the early 1960s, Perkins began playing electric guitar with west Texas rock bands, and was discovered by Mickey Jones and Kenny Rogers of The First Edition. By 1966, he enlisted into the Army National Guard and was discharged from the US Army Reserves in 1970.

== 1970s ==
In 1970, Perkins joined the east Texas country rock band, Shiloh, and moved to California. The band included Don Henley and future producer/record executive Jim Ed Norman. Perkins was then hired to play in the new incarnation of the Flying Burrito Brothers and recorded the live album The Last of the Red Hot Burritos in 1972. Perkins, along with Chris Hillman, formerly of The Byrds, went on to join Stephen Stills' Manassas, whose material fused Latin, rock, blues, country, folk, and bluegrass influences. He also played steel guitar on the Rolling Stones' song, "Torn and Frayed" on Exile on Main St.

With Stills working with Crosby, Stills & Nash, Perkins and Hillman joined Richie Furay (Buffalo Springfield and Poco founding member) and JD Souther in the Souther–Hillman–Furay Band. Perkins moved into record production in the mid-1970s, but did tour again with Michael Nesmith and McGuinn & Hillman. As a session player, Perkins contributed to many notable albums, including the Eagles' On the Border.

He joined the British band Ark in 1977 and recorded the album The Angels Come.

== 1980s ==
Continuing his production work into the 1980s, Perkins also toured with Chris Hillman as a duo before joining Dolly Parton in 1986, touring and recording with her for several years before moving to Nashville.

In Nashville Perkins formed a new project called The Nash Ramblers with Emmylou Harris, with whom he had worked previously on the two solo albums recorded by Gram Parsons. (It was his association with Parsons that led to Perkins being called in to play on the sessions for the Rolling Stones' Exile on Main Street). The Live at the Ryman album was to win Perkins his first Grammy award in 1992.

Perkins is listed playing pedal steel guitar on two albums by Christian singer Don Francisco: Holiness and One Heart at a Time. He is listed as the producer of the "One Heart at a Time" album.

== 1990s–present ==
Al Perkins continues to tour and record. To date, other artists Al Perkins has played for are: James Taylor, Bob Dylan, Tori Amos, Garth Brooks, Dwight Yoakam, Dan Fogelberg, Joe Walsh, Mike Love, Solomon Burke, Patty Loveless, Cher, Rita Coolidge, Iris DeMent, Michael Martin Murphey, Buddy Miller, Tommy Womack, Yo La Tengo, and Jim Lauderdale.

In 2002 Perkins released a collection of studio outtakes and rare recordings. Snapshots features recordings by the Nash Ramblers and the Flying Burrito Brothers among others. This was followed in 2003 by Triple Play, Perkins' first solo album, revealing blues, country, bluegrass, gospel and Cajun influences.

Perkins appeared on stage alongside James Burton and Keith Richards at the Gram Parsons tribute show in California in summer 2004.

Throughout the 2000s Perkins toured periodically with the Road Trippers, a band led by Kevin Montgomery and occasionally included Mike McAdam and Mavericks Paul Deakin and Robert Reynolds.

In 2009, Perkins formed Big Dog 3, a trio with bassist Chris Donohue and drummer Brady Blade. Big Dog 3's self-titled debut album features guests such as Jim Lauderdale and Emmylou Harris. Today Al Perkins performs with The HiPower Band, which includes vocalist Kristine Arnold (Sweethearts of the Rodeo).

== Awards ==
=== Grammy Awards ===
- 1997 – Producer on Best Southern, Country, or Bluegrass Gospel Album
- 1992 – Best Country Performance by a Duo or Group With Vocal
- 1991 – Best Bluegrass Album

=== Other awards ===
- 2015 – Induction to the Colorado Music Hall of Fame (Manassas)
- 2007 – 'Musician of the Year' Texas Music Awards
- 1997 – Induction to The Texas Steel Guitar Hall of Fame
- 1993 – Induction to Opryland's Starwalk
- 1985 – Indie Award for album production on Desert Rose

== Collaborations ==
With Tori Amos

- From the Choirgirl Hotel (Atlantic Records, 1998)

With Bob Bennett

- First Things First (Maranatha! Records, 1979)

With Solomon Burke

- Nashville (Shout! Factory, 2006)

With Garth Brooks

- Sevens (Capitol Records, 1997)

With Kate Campbell

- Songs from the Levee (Compass Records, 1994)
- Moonpie Dreams (Demon Records, 1997)

With Steve Camp

- Justice (Sparrow Records, 1988)

With Cher

- Cher (Casablanca Records, 1979)

With Gene Clark

- Two Sides to Every Story (RSO, 1977)

With Leonard Cohen

- Death of a Ladies' Man (Columbia Records, 1977)

With Rita Coolidge

- The Lady's Not for Sale (A&M Records, 1972)
- Fall into Spring (A&M Records, 1974)
- It's Only Love (A&M Records, 1975)
- Anytime...Anywhere (A&M Records, 1977)

With John Denver

- The Flower That Shattered the Stone (Windstar Records, 1990)

With George Ducas

- Where I Stand (Capitol Records, 1997)

With Bob Dylan

- Knocked Out Loaded (Columbia Records, 1986)

With Eagles

- On the Border (Asylum Records, 1974)

With Tim Easton

- Special 20 (Heathen Records, 1998)

With Dan Fogelberg

- Souvenirs (Epic Records, 1974)
- Captured Angel (Epic Records, 1975)
- Nether Lands (Epic Records, 1977)
- The Innocent Age (Epic Records, 1981)
- High Country Snows (Epic Records, 1985)

With Steve Forbert

- Rocking Horse Heads (Revolution Records, 1996)

With Richie Furay

- I've Got a Reason (Asylum Records, 1976)
- Dance a Little Light (Asylum Records, 1978)
- Seasons of Change (Myrrh Records, 1982)
- The Heartbeat of Love (Always An Adventure, 2006)

With John Wesley Harding

- The Confessions of St. Ace (Mammoth Records, 2000)

With Emmylou Harris

- Cowgirl's Prayer (Warner Bros. Records, 1993)

With Mark Heard

- Appalachian Melody (Solid Rock, 1979)
- Eye of the Storm (Home Sweet Home, 1983)

With Chris Hillman

- Slippin' Away (Asylum Records, 1976)
- Morning Sky (Sugar Hill Records, 1982)
- Desert Rose (Sugar Hill Records, 1984)

With Nancy Honeytree

- Melodies In Me (Myrrh Records, 1978)
- Maranatha Marathon (Myrrh Records, 1979)

With Wynonna Judd

- The Other Side (Curb Records, 1997)

With Bill LaBounty

- Bill LaBounty (Warner Bros. Records, 1982)

With Miranda Lambert

- Palomino (RCA Records, 2022)

With Jim Lauderdale

- Planet of Love (Reprise Records, 1991)
- Persimmons (Rounder Records, 1996)
- Patchwork River (Thirty Tigers, 2010)
- I'm a Song (Sky Crunch Records, 2014)

With Roger McGuinn

- Peace on You (Columbia Records, 1974)

With Michael Martin Murphey

- High Stakes (Murphey Kinship Recordings, 2016)

With Michael Nesmith

- Infinite Rider on the Big Dogma (Pacific Arts, 1979)

With Randy Newman

- Good Old Boys (Reprise Records, 1974)

With Juice Newton

- Ain't Gonna Cry (RCA Records, 1989)

With Joe Nichols

- III (Universal South Records, 2005)

With Gram Parsons

- GP (Reprise Records, 1973)
- Grievous Angel (Reprise Records, 1974)

With Dolly Parton

- Here You Come Again (RCA Victor, 1977)
- Dolly, Dolly, Dolly (RCA Victor, 1981)
- Rainbow (Columbia Records, 1987)
- Hungry Again (Decca Records, 1998)
- Precious Memories (Blue Eye, 1999)

With Billy Preston

- The Kids & Me (A&M Records, 1974)

With John Prine

- In Spite of Ourselves (Oh Boy Records, 1999)
- For Better, or Worse (Oh Boy Records, 2016)

With Terry Reid

- Seed of Memory (ABC Records, 1976)

With The Rolling Stones

- Exile on Main St. (Rolling Stones Records, 1972)

With Tom Rush

- Voices (Appleseed Records, 2018)

With Michelle Shocked

- Short Sharp Shocked (Mercury Records, 1988)

With Jill Sobule

- Jill Sobule (Atlantic Records, 1995)
- Happy Town (Atlantic Records, 1997)
- Underdog Victorious (Artemis Records, 2004)

With Donna Summer

- Bad Girls (Casablanca Records, 1979)

With Russ Taff

- Winds of Change (Warner Bros. Records, 1995)

With James Taylor

- Gorilla (Warner Bros. Records, 1975)

With The Tractors

- Fast Girl (Audium Records, 2001)

With Joe Walsh

- Barnstorm (ABC Records, 1972)

With Dwight Yoakam

- Buenas Noches From a Lonely Room (Reprise Records, 1988)
- If There Was a Way (Reprise Records, 1990)
- This Time (Reprise Records, 1993)
- A Long Way Home (Reprise Records, 1998)

With Michael Brewer

- Beauty Lies (Warner Bros. Records, 1983)
