= Supermodel (Jill Sobule song) =

1995 single by Jill Sobule

Single by Jill Sobule

from the album Jill Sobule
- B-side: "Trains"; "Queen of Spades"
- Released: July 10, 1995
- Studio: Alex the Great (Nashville)
- Genre: Alternative rock
- Length: 3:07
- Label: Atlantic; Lava
- Songwriters: David Baerwald; David Kitay; Brian MacLeod; Kristen Vigard
- Producers: Brad Jones; Robin Eaton

Jill Sobule singles chronology
"I Kissed a Girl" (1995)	"Supermodel" (1995)	"Good Person Inside" (1996)

Music video
- "Supermodel" on YouTube

"Supermodel" is a song by American singer-songwriter Jill Sobule from the soundtrack to the teen comedy film Clueless (1995), and the reissue of her self-titled second studio album (1995). It was written by David Baerwald, David Kitay, Brian MacLeod, and Kristen Vigard, and produced by Brad Jones and Robin Eaton. Atlantic and Lava Records released it as the soundtrack's third single and Jill Sobule's second single on July 10, 1995. An alternative rock song, it was inspired by excerpts from Sassy and is about a teenage girl's desire to be a supermodel.

"Supermodel" received a positive reception from music critics, who praised the song's sarcastic lyrics and deemed it a highlight of the Clueless soundtrack. In Australia, the song spent five weeks on the ARIA Singles Chart where it peaked at number 53. Morgan Lawley directed its music video, which was heavily inspired by the supernatural horror film Carrie (1976). Sobule later voiced regret over the song's release as a follow-up to her breakthrough single "I Kissed a Girl". "Supermodel" was regularly included on the set lists for Sobule's tours.

== Writing and inspiration ==
"Supermodel" was written by David Baerwald, David Kitay, Brian MacLeod, and Kristen Vigard for the soundtrack to the 1995 film Clueless. The song was conceptualized after Karyn Rachtman, the film's music supervisor, hired Baerwald to write a "fresher" song as a replacement to David Bowie's "Fashion", which was originally set to play during a makeover scene in the film. The writers intended for "Supermodel" to sound as though "it came out of the mouths of teenage girls," as they were specifically tasked with a writing a song that captured the essence of the world surrounding the film's main character, teenage fashionista Cher Horowitz. In an effort to make the song sound authentic, Baerwald reviewed several issues of the teen magazine Sassy, in which he lifted multiple lines from the letter to the editors for inclusion in "Supermodel". Speaking on the song's lyrics, Baerwald commented: "Every demographic has its way of talking, and I wanted to capture a sense of the rhythm and the kinds of things girls were talking about. I thought Sassy was really cool!"

In 1995, Rachtman approached Sobule to ask if she would be interested in recording "Supermodel". Sobule was initially hesitant to accept the offer, as she had taken no part in writing the song and she believed Clueless to be a mindless teen comedy film. Sobule, however, changed her mind after viewing a pre-screening of the film, in which she reevaluated it as a feminist work. Frustrated that her previous single "I Kissed a Girl" was promoted as a novelty song, Sobule agreed to perform "Supermodel" on the condition that she could add her own flair to it. Sobule added a guitar solo and a bridge that referenced her past struggles with an eating disorder. According to Sobule, the bridge was intended to act as a commentary on the beauty-industrial complex. Despite these additions, Sobule did not receive any songwriting credit for "Supermodel". Speaking on being uncredited as a songwriter, Sobule commented: "It doesn’t bother me now, but I think it was kind of shitty and I don’t know if I’ve ever said that. I wish I would have been more proactive and talked to the writers directly."

== Release and reception ==
On July 8, 1995, Capitol Records vice president of marketing Tom Corson announced that "Supermodel" would likely be released as the third single from the Clueless soundtrack. Two days later, it was serviced to US alternative radio, additionally serving as the second single from Jill Sobule. On July 18, the Clueless soundtrack was released. Following the release of the soundtrack, Sobule reissued her self-titled second studio album on August 1, 1995, with the addition of "Supermodel". Since the song's release, Sobule and other acts involved with the song have voiced their regret over its release as a single. In 1997, Lava Records Chairman Jason Flom stated that he felt as though "Supermodel" was a "smart choice" at the time of release, although he believed it ultimately killed any momentum Sobule had following the success of her previous single, "I Kissed a Girl". Despite Rachtman recruiting Sobule for "Supermodel", she later claimed that the song's release "might have been the death of [Sobule's] career." Speaking on the song's release as a single, Sobule commented: "I have not always made the best business decisions."

"Supermodel" received generally favorable reviews from music critics. Larry Flick of Billboard noted the "tongue-in-cheek flair" of the song, in which he commented that "the sarcastic undertone will smack all but the superficial in the face." Also from Billboard, Kenneth Partridge praised the "brisk rocker" and referred to the song's bridge as "the most scathing series of lines in an alt-rock novelty whose sarcasm doesn’t spoil the party." Roch Parisien of AllMusic referred to "Supermodel" as a "wry, deadpan" song, in which he highlighted the song's bridge. Gabriela Tully Claymore of Stereogum praised "Supermodel" as the most memorable song from the Clueless soundtrack. She particularly praised Sobule's addition of the bridge, which she believed "turned the track from a defiant jab at superficial teen culture into a pointed critique of body-image standards." Commercially, "Supermodel" achieved minimal success in Australia. On January 14, 1996, the song entered the ARIA Singles Chart, where it spent a total of five weeks. "Supermodel" reached a peak position of number 53 on the chart.

== Music video ==
=== Background ===
The video was filmed in July 1995 over the course of the 24th and 25th; Sobule had to cancel two tour dates as the director was only available to work on the video over these two dates. Sobule sought control over the video's direction, in which she opted to satirize the 1976 supernatural horror film Carrie. In the video, Sobule takes on a similar role to the film's title character, as she portrays a school outcast that has supernatural powers. The video's only reference to Clueless is a brief introductory scene featuring two of the film's characters, Cher and Di, walking to class. According to Sobule, Lava Records was unhappy that she did not incorporate more of the film's fashion into the video. In 2020, Sobule said not tying the song's video to Clueless was a mistake.

=== Synopsis ===
The video starts with a brief scene from the film Clueless, in which characters Cher and Di walk side-by-side to class while talking on their cell phones. The video then cuts to Sobule portraying an outcast named Jill White, who is intentionally tripped by a group of gossiping girls in the school hallway. As the first verse begins, the video intercuts between scenes of Sobule performing with a band on stage and her character using supernatural powers to start the fire sprinklers above the group of girls. The video then cuts to White daydreaming about a boy during class. After being scolded by her teacher for doing so, she uses her supernatural powers to throw him across the classroom. As the video continues to intercut between scenes of Sobule playing with her band, the video depicts an advertisement for a "Supermodel of the Future" contest and White finds out she was nominated as a contestant. As the song's bridge begins, the video cuts to the contest in the school's gymnasium, where it is revealed that White won. As she is crowned, however, another student dumps a hidden bucket of blood onto White. In retaliation, White uses her supernatural powers to lock the doors of the gymnasium and set the school on fire.

== Track listings and formats ==
- Australian CD single
1. "Supermodel" – 3:10
2. "Trains" – 3:44
3. "Queen of Spades" – 3:21

== Credits and personnel ==
Credits and personnel are adapted from the Jill Sobule album liner notes.

- Jill Sobule – vocals, guitars
- Brad Jones – producer, mixing, guitar
- Robin Eaton – producer, mixing, bass
- Craig Krampf – drums
- Greg Calbi – mastering

== Charts ==
Weekly chart performance for "Supermodel"
Chart (1996)	Peak position
Australia (ARIA)	53

== Release history ==
Region	Date	Format(s)	Label(s)	Ref.
United States	July 10, 1995	Alternative radio	Atlantic; Lava	
United States	August 22, 1995	Contemporary hit radio	Atlantic; Lava	
Australia	November 20, 1995	CD	Atlantic; Lava	
