= Grace of My Heart =

1996 film by Allison Anders

- Theatrical poster
- Directed by: Allison Anders
- Written by: Allison Anders
- Produced by: Ruth Charny; Daniel Hassid
- Starring: Illeana Douglas; Matt Dillon; Eric Stoltz; Bruce Davison; Patsy Kensit; John Turturro
- Cinematography: Jean-Yves Escoffier
- Edited by: James Y. Kwei; Harvey Rosenstock; Thelma Schoonmaker
- Music by: Larry Klein
- Distributed by: Gramercy Pictures
- Release dates: September 8, 1996 (TIFF); September 13, 1996 (United States)
- Running time: 116 minutes
- Country: United States
- Language: English
- Budget: $5 million
- Box office: $660,313

Grace of My Heart is a 1996 American musical comedy-drama film written and directed by Allison Anders, and starring Illeana Douglas, Matt Dillon, Eric Stoltz, Patsy Kensit and John Turturro. The film charts the fictional music career of Denise Waverly, an aspiring singer who writes for other artists in the pop music world of the mid-1960s. It premiered at the 1996 Toronto International Film Festival and went into limited release on September 13, 1996.

The soundtrack features artists Burt Bacharach, Elvis Costello, Joni Mitchell, Gerry Goffin and Jill Sobule, replicating the musical style that emerged from the Brill Building, New York City's music factory in the heyday of girl groups and "pre-fab" acts like The Monkees.

== Plot ==
In 1958, Philadelphia steel heiress Edna Buxton enters and wins a talent contest. When she attempts to record a demo, a studio producer tells her that girl singers are not currently getting signed and record companies are even trying to get rid of the ones on their rosters. However, when Edna tells him that she wrote the song she wants to record, he is impressed enough to direct her to producer Joel Milner, who takes her under his wing, renames her "Denise Waverly" and invents a blue-collar persona for her. Milner reworks her song for a male doo-wop group, the Stylettes, as male groups are far more marketable, and the song becomes a hit.

Denise moves to New York City and becomes a songwriter in the Brill Building. At a party, she meets the arrogant songwriter Howard Caszatt, and despite an awkward initial meeting, they begin a relationship. Denise offers to write a song specifically for her three girlfriends, which culminates in Joel auditioning the girls and creating the girl group the Luminaries. Howard and Denise also begin writing together and eventually get married and have a child. They pen a song called "Unwanted Number," based on a young girl's unwanted pregnancy. Although it is banned from radio, it attracts the attention of prominent and influential disc jockey John Murray, who, despite the negative attention around the song, credits Denise with sparking the girl group craze.

Joel recruits the beautiful English songwriter Cheryl Steed, who immediately catches Howard's eye, and initially, Denise's disdain. Cheryl diffuses Denise's suspicion by informing her that she already has a songwriting partner – her husband Matthew. Joel tasks Denise and Cheryl with writing a song for the ingénue singer Kelly Porter. The two women bond over the realization that the young singer is in a closeted lesbian relationship with her roommate Marion. They write the coded song "My Secret Love" for Kelly, which becomes a hit.

Denise's relationship with Howard becomes strained due to his philandering with other women. When she learns she is pregnant with Howard's second baby, Cheryl convinces her to see an obstetrician, who safely performs an abortion. Denise and Cheryl then become close friends and Denise eventually breaks up with Howard.

In 1966, Milner offers to send Denise to the studio to sing for herself. As an added incentive, he offers the production assistance of Jay Phillips, the frontman of California rock group the Riptides, to produce her single. Although initially hesitant as she says she finds the whole "surf and turf" sound laughable, she writes and sings the song "God Give Me Strength" and is delighted by Jay's skillful orchestral arrangement. The record she puts out with him, however, is a commercial failure. Between the loss suffered by her foundering single and the advent of the British Invasion, Milner's fortunes are depleted. Denise blames herself for making the song too personal and bankrupting Joel. He tells her she did more for him than she realized and that it was time for them both to move on.

Denise and Jay become a couple and resettle in California. Jay treats Denise's daughter Luna as his own, but he is reclusive and a user of recreational drugs like marijuana and peyote. Denise has since joined forces with the newly divorced Cheryl to write songs for a bubblegum pop TV show, Where the Action Is, though Jay insists to Denise that writing music for TV is beneath her.

Jay's behavior becomes more erratic and he becomes increasingly paranoid, causing his bandmates to distance themselves from him. He falls into a period of deep depression that seemingly abates after a visit from his friend "Jonesy", who reminds him of the things that are important in his life, including his "groovy new old lady", Denise.

Thinking that the worst is over, Denise invites Jay to join her and Cheryl at the Whisky a Go Go to see Doris, a former Luminary member who embarked on a solo career after the girl group broke up, perform. Jay declines, saying he has a song idea he wants to explore, so Denise ends up going with Cheryl. While the women celebrate, Jay is revealed to be still in the throes of his depression; having put on a brave face for Denise's benefit. He walks into the ocean, taking his own life. Denise is further distraught to discover that Jay's fans blame her for not intervening in his death.

Numbed by the loss, Denise retires with her family to a hippie commune in northern California and tries to make sense of everything that has happened. Some time later, Joel visits Denise at the commune and takes her and the children to dinner. That night, he criticizes how far down she's allowed her grieving to take her and says that it's destroying her and her talent. Denise angrily lashes out, telling Milner that he'd be nothing without her success. He agrees; however, the more he agrees with her, the angrier she becomes. She strikes him then collapses in tears, grieving for Jay. Milner consoles her and the two are reconciled.

With Joel's help, Denise creates the platinum-selling work "Grace of My Heart". As she lays down the piano track for the song, her life is recounted in pictures, leading to the moment when her own mother receives a copy of her album in the mail with a handwritten note. Seemingly proud of her daughter's success, she smiles.

== Cast ==
- Illeana Douglas as Edna Buxton/Denise Waverly
- Matt Dillon as Jay Phillips
- Eric Stoltz as Howard Caszatt
- John Turturro as Joel Milner
- Patsy Kensit as Cheryl Steed
- Bruce Davison as John Murray
- Jennifer Leigh Warren as Doris Shelley
- Bridget Fonda as Kelly Porter
- Chris Isaak as Matthew Lewis
- David Clennon as Dr. "Jonesy" Jones
- Lucinda Jenney as Marion
- Christina Pickles as Mrs. Buxton
- Lynne Adams as Kindly Nurse
- Richard Schiff as Audition Record Producer
- Peter Fonda as Guru Dave (voice only)
- Tegan West as M.C. at Talent Show

== Production ==
The story is loosely based on the career arc of singer-songwriter Carole King, who, like Denise, started out writing songs in the Brill Building for artists like Aretha Franklin, The Drifters, and Little Eva. The character of Joel Milner is a pastiche of Phil Spector and song publisher Lester Sill. Jay Phillips is loosely modeled on Brian Wilson of The Beach Boys.

Allison Anders said she was inspired to make the film as a fan of the girl group The Shangri-Las. She was also inspired by the Alan Betrock book Girl Groups: The Story of A Sound, which contained photos of "Carole King and Gerry Goffin then others like Cynthia Weil and Barry Mann...it was interesting to read what Alan had to say about what that time was like back then and how they were all really just kids when they had been a part of that."

Martin Scorsese is credited as Grace of My Heart's executive producer, and the film is co-edited by Scorsese's longtime editor Thelma Schoonmaker.

== Music ==
Actress Douglas' singing voice is dubbed by singer Kristen Vigard, while the fictional Luminaries are dubbed by girl group For Real.

In the beginning, Edna/Denise performs a version of "Hey There", from the musical The Pajama Game, and popularized by singers such as Rosemary Clooney. Another of Denise's big musical moments occurs in the studio to sing tracks for "God Give Me Strength", an expensively produced single that fails to generate excitement on the charts, alluding to Phil Spector's recording of "River Deep – Mountain High" for Tina Turner (written by Spector, Ellie Greenwich and Jeff Barry). Singer Elvis Costello, who co-wrote "God Give Me Strength" with Burt Bacharach for the film, also wrote "Unwanted Number", which is crafted by Denise and Cazsatt for the Luminaries and causes a scandal due to its story of a young, unmarried mother.

Singer-composer Lesley Gore co-wrote the song "My Secret Love", performed by the character of young singer Kelly Porter. Gore chose not to be credited as a co-writer because she felt she'd "been brought in too late for a real collaboration" and was not invited to the film's New York City premiere, a logistical oversight Anders regretted.

Brian Wilson and Mike Love wrote and recorded a demo for "a possible title song" to the film in March 1995.

=== Soundtrack ===
The soundtrack was released in September 1996 by MCA Records. It was produced by Larry Klein, Joni Mitchell's former husband and producer. Klein contributed to the writing of several songs on the soundtrack and appears briefly in the movie as a recording engineer.

Joni Mitchell contributed the song "Man from Mars", which is performed by Vigard as heard in the film. The soundtrack's initial pressing of 40,000 CD copies contained a version featuring Mitchell's vocals instead of Vigard's. This CD was recalled and re-released a week later with Vigard's vocal restored. Mitchell later re-recorded the song with different-styled music for her 1998 album Taming the Tiger.

Grace of My Heart: Original Motion Picture Soundtrack
No.	Title	Writer(s)	Length
1.	"God Give Me Strength" (Elvis Costello, Burt Bacharach)	Costello, Bacharach	6:06
2.	"Love Doesn't Ever Fail Us" (The Williams Brothers)	Tonio K., Larry Klein	3:06
3.	"Take a Run at the Sun" (J Mascis)	Mascis	3:27
4.	"I Do" (For Real)	Carole Bayer Sager, Dave Stewart	3:30
5.	"Between Two Worlds" (Shawn Colvin)	David Baerwald, Michael Convertino, Gerry Goffin, Louise Goffin	3:57
6.	"My Secret Love" (Miss Lily Banquette)	Baerwald, Klein, Lesley Gore	5:10
7.	"Man from Mars" (Kristen Vigard)	Joni Mitchell	3:29
8.	"Born to Love That Boy" (For Real)	Goffin, Klein	3:27
9.	"Truth Is You Lied" (Jill Sobule)	Mark Fosson, Paul Marshall	3:54
10.	"Unwanted Number" (For Real)	Costello	3:30
11.	"Groovin' on You" (Juned)	Lyn Hardy	2:34
12.	"In Another World" (Portrait)	Goffin, Los Lobos	4:34
13.	"Don't You Think It's Time" (J Mascis)	Mascis	2:25
14.	"Absence Makes the Heart Grow Fonder" (Tiffany Anders, Boyd Rice)	Anders, Rice	4:56
15.	"A Boat on the Sea" (Kristen Vigard)	Baerwald, Klein	2:53
Total length:			56:58

==== Other songs ====
Several songs did not make the album soundtrack, such as both of Vigard's renditions of "Hey There"—the contest version and the polished demo. Her version of "In Another World" is swapped out for the fictional Stylettes' rendition (via Portrait). Vigard's "God Give Me Strength" is also swapped for the Costello/Bacharach version. "A Wave Dies", written and performed by Andrew Allen-King and produced by Klein, was also not included in the final cut. The Williams Brothers perform two songs, "Heartbreak Kid" and "Love Doesn't Ever Fail Us", but only the latter is on the album.

== Release and reception ==
=== Release ===
Grace of My Heart debuted at the Toronto International Film Festival on September 8, 1996. It was theatrically released a few days later on September 13, 1996, just weeks ahead of Oscar-winning actor Tom Hanks' directorial debut That Thing You Do!, which also covered the early to mid-1960s pop music scene and featured original, retro-styled songs on the soundtrack. Grace of My Heart grossed $660,313 worldwide.

=== Home media ===
Grace of My Heart was released as a Blu-ray Collector's Edition by Scorpion Releasing on November 17, 2020. The Blu-ray includes an audio commentary by Anders and a making-of featurette.

=== Critical response ===
On the review aggregator website Rotten Tomatoes, 79% of 28 critics' reviews are positive, with an average rating of 6.9/10.

David Ansen of Newsweek praised the film and wrote while it "is not the smoothest trip" story-wise, "Anders's rough edges are more than offset by the story's contagious vitality...Denise's funky journey to self-discovery is a fresh feminist take on an era that has always been seen through men's eyes. It may not be precision-tooled, but it's triumphantly alive."

Time Out wrote, "There's a lovely sequence about a third of the way into Anders' delightful movie which follows a song from conception - the street scene that inspires it - through the writing, to the recording session. This seamlessly edited passage swings like the snappy '60s girl pop it emulates. Like the film as a whole, it works as a musical in its own right, and as history and critique of the pop process."

Critics roundly praised the film's music, particularly the Brill Building scenes, and lauded the film's approach of pairing popular songwriters of the 1960s with contemporary artists. Mark Caro of the Chicago Tribune wrote:

What Anders captures is the feel of the time: the nervous thrill of singing a song you love; the sanctified atmosphere of a recording studio, with red padded walls that match the singer's lipstick and a slit of a window that reveals a live bassist; the songwriter's excitement in realizing that songs can be about people's actual lives and still be commercial; the breathlessness of keeping up with an industry that may love a cappella vocal groups one day and rock bands the next.

Criticism centered on the film's shift of the action from New York City to California to center on Denise's relationship with Jay, with many arguing it is where the story loses focus. Roger Ebert praised the music and Douglas' performance, but said Anders tries to cover too much ground and would have liked a less condensed story.

In a 2020 episode of his podcast Kermode on Film, film critic Mark Kermode named Grace of My Heart number one on his countdown of the top five most underrated films of all time. Jim Hemphill of Filmmaker wrote the film "feels both completely of the period in which it takes place and like something that could only have been made in the mid-1990s, an age when the American independent film movement and the studio system intersected in a way that allowed auteurs like Anders to broaden their ambitions and expand their canvasses."
