= Happy Town (album) =

Studio album by Jill Sobule
- Released: March 18, 1997
- Genre: Experimental pop
- Length: 46:23
- Label: Atlantic
- Producers: Robin Eaton, Brad Jones

Jill Sobule chronology
Jill Sobule (1995)	Happy Town (1997)	Pink Pearl (2000)

Singles from Happy Town
- 1. "Bitter" Released: June 1997; 2. "When My Ship Comes In" Released: September 1997

Happy Town is the third album by the American singer-songwriter Jill Sobule, released in 1997. The album contains the singles "Bitter" and "When My Ship Comes In".

The album cover illustration, which initially featured a Prozac pill, was changed to show a pair of test tubes when Wal-Mart refused to carry the album in its stores. The company asserted that the original image promoted drug abuse.

== Music and lyrics ==
In 1997, The Washington Times labelled the album as having "smart, funny, quirky pop songs", and considered it to be building on the sound of her 1995 self-titled album. They believed that album to be a noticeable departure from her 1990 debut Things Here Are Different, which they said had more of a typical, serious female singer-songwriter sound. In 1998, The New York Daily News considered her lighthearted female singer-songwriter sound to be similar to newer artists such as Amy Rigby and Kim Fox, who released their debuts in the wake of Sobule's self-titled album.

The album incorporates a variety of instruments, including cornets, flutes, hurdy-gurdys, organs, harmoniums, saxophones, steel pedal guitars, synthesizers, tubas, vibraphones and wurlitzers. The track "Soldiers of Christ" is a satirical social commentary, where Sobule sings from the point of view of a Christian Conservative to illustrate the existence of homophobia in religion. The music on the track itself is earnest, contrasting the satirical lyrics. "Underachiever" is one of the album's more melancholic tracks, and lyrically is a character sketch about a social outcast high school girl. AllMusic described the song as being a "poignant tale of an oversensitive high school history student who loves to gaze the hour away at her teacher without thought to her declining grades". An outtake called "Loveless Motel" was included as a B-side for the "Bitter" single. It was later included on Sobule's 2000 album Pink Pearl.

== Commercial performance and promotion ==
The album only sold 24,000 copies in the US within the first year of its release, which was then a low number for an artist on a major record label. It did not manage to chart in the United States, and Sobule was dropped by Atlantic after the release of Happy Town. Sobule said she was "proud" of the record and its honesty and experimentation, even though it got her dropped from Atlantic. She said that it went in even more of a strange direction than her previous record, which the label didn't think was a good idea.

"Bitter" was released as a single a few months after the album came out, and had a music video. The song was relatively successful in Australia, peaking at No. 74 on the Australian ARIA singles chart in June 1997, and the album itself peaked at No. 83 on the Australian ARIA albums chart during the same month. The song's video would be featured on Australian music video program Rage. "Bitter" also received some radio airplay in Germany and Switzerland during June 1997.

== Critical reception ==
Professional ratings
Review scores
Source	Rating
AllMusic	4.5/5 stars
Deseret News	3/4 stars
The Encyclopedia of Popular Music	3/5 stars
MusicHound Rock: The Essential Album Guide	3/5 stars
Rolling Stone	2.5/5 stars

The Spokesman-Review called the album "a bold step forward for a creatively expansive artist." Trouser Press called it "a record to respect rather than appreciate," writing that "many of the songs are fine, and she’s one of contemporary pop’s better observational songwriters, but the tone is unremittingly hostile." The Deseret News gave it three out of four stars, deeming it "fun, liberal, spunky and sarcastic." The Baltimore Sun wrote that "the title tune's shift from cheesy, low-key organ to bright, power-pop guitar make it easy to understand the difference between the dull old world and life in that new, prozac-ed 'Happy Town'."

== Track listing ==
1. "Bitter" (Richard Barone, Sobule) – 3:30
2. "Happy Town" (Goldenberg, Sobule) – 3:46
3. "Barren Egg" (Eaton, Sobule) – 3:37
4. "Half a Heart" (DeMain, Sobule) – 3:47
5. "When My Ship Comes In" (Eaton, Marvin Gaye, Ivy Jo Hunter, Sobule, William Stevenson) – 3:50
6. "Clever" (Eaton, Sobule) – 3:18
7. "I'm So Happy" (Eaton, Sobule) – 2:43
8. "Little Guy" (Sobule) – 3:24
9. "Underachiever" (Sobule) – 3:42
10. "Love Is Never Equal" (Eaton, Sobule) – 3:15
11. "Soldiers of Christ" (Eaton, Sobule) – 3:20
12. "Attic" (Sobule) – 2:10
13. "Sold My Soul" (Eaton, Sobule) – 3:35
14. "Super 8" (Galdston, Sobule) – 2:26

== Personnel ==
=== Musicians ===
- Jill Sobule – vocals, acoustic guitar, bass guitar, guitar, percussion, drums, keyboards, ebo, vibraphone
- Sam Bacco – percussion
- George Bradfute – electric guitar
- Louis Brown – tuba, cornet
- Chris Carmichael – strings
- Steve Earle – electric guitar, vocals
- Robin Eaton – guitar
- Phil Galdston – keyboards
- Mark Goldenberg – guitar, keyboards, vocals
- Mickey Grimm – percussion, drums
- Jim Hoke – clarinet, flute, harmonica, autoharp, bass clarinet, soprano saxophone
- Byron House – upright bass
- Brad Jones – organ, bass guitar, piano, harmonium, keyboards, Moog synthesizer, vibraphone
- Viktor Krauss – upright bass
- Roger Moutenot – Moog synthesizer
- Al Perkins – pedal steel
- Ross Rice – bass guitar, piano, drums, harmonium, Wurlitzer

=== Production ===
- Producers: Robin Eaton, Mark Goldenberg, Brad Jones
- Engineers: Brad Jones, Dominick Maita, Elijah Shaw
- Mixing: Roger Moutenot
- Mixing assistants: Rich Cohan, Sandy Jenkins, Chris Stone
- Programming: Mark Goldenberg
- Photography: Annette Aurell
- Arranger: Phil Galdston
- Production Coordination: Barbara Moutenot
- Cover design: Brad Talbott
- Illustrations: Brad Talbott
- Background vocals: Bob, Jim, Mary Ellen and Matthew Sobule

== Charts ==
Chart performance for Happy Town
Chart (1997)	Peak position
Australian Albums (ARIA)	83
