= Pink Pearl =

Studio album by Jill Sobule
- Released: April 18, 2000
- Genre: Pop
- Length: 41:28
- Label: Beyond
- Producer: Jill Sobule, Robin Eaton, Brad Jones

Jill Sobule chronology
Happy Town (1997)	Pink Pearl (2000)	The Folk Years 2003–2003 (2004)

Professional ratings
Review scores
Source	Rating
AllMusic	4/5 stars
Robert Christgau	(neither)
Entertainment Weekly	B+
People	(favorable)

Pink Pearl is the fourth album by American singer-songwriter Jill Sobule, released in 2000.

The record, whose name is both a model of pencil eraser by Eberhard Faber and a slang term for the clitoris, contains the singles "One of These Days" and "Rainy Day Parade". The album peaked at No. 10 on CMJ's Triple A radio airplay chart, and at No. 75 on CMJ's Radio 200 chart in May 2000.

The album includes the satirical "Heroes", which suggests that every potential hero turns out to be deeply flawed:

William Faulkner drunk and depressed
Dorothy Parker mean, drunk and depressed
And that guy in Seven Years in Tibet turned out to be a Nazi
The founding fathers all had slaves
The explorers slaughtered the braves
The Old Testament God can be so petty

The album's "Mary Kay" is a joking yet sympathetic take on Mary Kay Letourneau, the teacher who had sex with a 13-year-old student. "Lucy at the Gym" is a portrait of anorexia.

The song "Mexican Wrestler" was later covered by Emma Roberts on the Nickelodeon TV series Unfabulous, for which Sobule writes the music, and also appeared on Roberts' 2005 album Unfabulous and More: Emma Roberts. The track "Rainy Day Parade" was featured on the soundtrack to the Ben Stiller film Mystery Men.

The track "Rock Me to Sleep," co-written with Richard Barone, was featured on the television shows Felicity, Dawson's Creek, and The West Wing. It was also covered by Sally Timms of the Mekons on her 1999 album, Cowboy Sally's Twilight Laments for Lost Buckaroos.

== Track listing ==
1. "Rainy Day Parade" (Eaton, Sobule) – 3:04
2. "One of These Days" (Eaton, Sobule) – 3:53
3. "Lucy at the Gym" (Eaton, Sobule) – 3:46
4. "Claire" (Eaton, Sobule) – 3:39
5. "Mexican Wrestler" (Eaton, Sobule) – 4:15
6. "Heroes" (Eaton, Sobule) – 2:57
7. "Mary Kay" (Eaton, Sobule) – 3:25
8. "Somewhere in New Mexico" (Galdston, Sobule) – 4:29
9. "Guy Who Doesn't Get It" (Galdston, Sobule) – 3:39
10. "Someone's Gonna Break Your Heart" (Mastro, Sobule) – 3:12
11. "Loveless Motel" (Sobule) – 2:48
12. "Rock Me to Sleep" (Barone, Sobule) – 2:21

== Personnel ==
- Jill Sobule – synthesizer, guitar, drums, keyboards, vocals, omnichord
- Chris Carmichael – violin
- Charlie Chadwick – bass guitar
- Molly Felder – background vocals
- Mickey Grimm – drums, cajon
- Tommy Hannum – pedal steel
- Brad Jones – organ, bass, guitar, piano, harmonium, Moog synthesizer, arp, pump organ
- Michael Rhodes – bass
- Neal Rosengarden – percussion, drums

Production

- Producers: Jill Sobule, Robin Eaton, Brad Jones
- Engineers: Jill Sobule, Robin Eaton, David Henry, Brad Jones, Jason Lehning
- Mixing: Jill Sobule, Robin Eaton, Brad Jones
- Mastering: Steve Hall
- A&R: Randy Nicklaus
- Art direction: Susan McEowen
- Photography: Tom Schierlitz
- Design: James Victore
