= Kristen Vigard =

American actress and singer (born 1963)

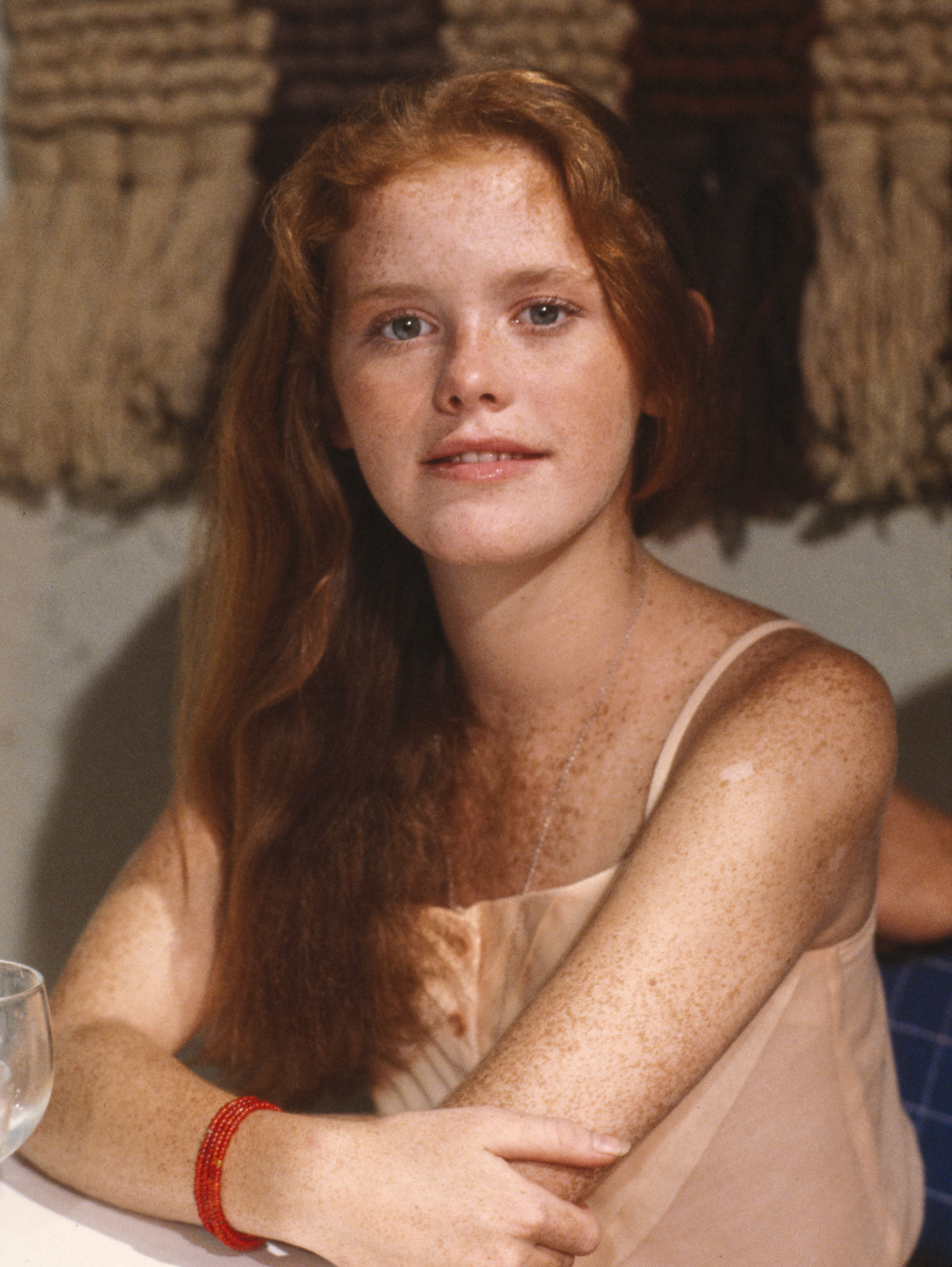
- Vigard in 1981

Background information
- Born: May 15, 1963 (age 63); St. Paul, Minnesota, U.S.
- Origin: New York City, U.S.
- Genres: Rock, alternative
- Occupations: Singer, actor
- Years active: 1970–present
- Label: Private Music
- Formerly of: Red Hot Chili Peppers; Fishbone; New White Trash

Kristen Vigard (born May 15, 1963) is an American actress and singer. She is known for being the first actress to play the title role in Annie in its pre-Broadway run and for her two-year run as Morgan Richards on Guiding Light (1980–81). She also had a two-year run on One Life to Live (1984–85). She has appeared in two feature films, The Black Stallion (1979) and The Survivors (1983), and had roles in two TV movies, Home to Stay (1978) and License to Kill (1984), as well as guest appearances on three TV series.

Kristen Vigard released her eponymous debut album in 1988. She recorded and toured as a backup singer with the Red Hot Chili Peppers and Fishbone in the late 1980s and early 1990s, appearing on RHCP's Mother's Milk (1989) and One Hot Minute (1995) and Fishbone's The Reality of My Surroundings (1991) and Give a Monkey a Brain (1993).

Vigard sang the lead vocals for Illeana Douglas for the 1996 film Grace of My Heart, including "God Give Me Strength", which was nominated for Best Original Song at the 1st Golden Satellite Awards.

She released her second album, God, Loves and Angels in 2004. More recently, she was a founding member of the downtempo acoustic rock band New White Trash, which released three albums between 2011 and 2014.

== Early life and education ==
Vigard was born on May 15, 1963, in St. Paul, Minnesota, the daughter of actress Mallory Millett Danaher and Ronald Vigard, who worked for 3M. In the late 1960s, she moved with her family to New York City where she made her acting debut at the age of 6. She was one of the first clients to be signed to the children's division of the Ford Modeling Agency, along with Brooke Shields and Ricky Schroder.

Vigard went to high school at Friends Seminary in Manhattan. She then studied classical orchestration and music listening at the Juilliard School of Music Extension Program.

== Career ==
=== Musical theatre ===
Vigard's debut stage role was in 1970 when she worked with La MaMa Experimental Theatre Club, appearing in A Cheap Trick, playing a carrot in a production starring Holly Woodlawn, Candy Darling and Jackie Curtis. This was followed by a role in 100 Miles from Nowhere, and she appeared with Ruby Dee in The Wedding Band in 1972. Vigard continued performing in theatre, appearing in additional productions with Joanne Woodward and Shirley Knight.

In 1976, she created the title role in the musical Annie at the Goodspeed Opera House in East Haddam, Connecticut. However, the producers soon decided that Vigard's genuinely sweet interpretation was not tough enough for the street-smart character. After a week of performances, Vigard was replaced by Andrea McArdle, who played one of the orphans. Vigard later went on to become McArdle's Broadway understudy.

In 1977, Vigard played "Crissy" in the short-lived Broadway revival of Hair: The American Tribal Love-Rock Musical. Though the show met with mostly negative reviews, Vigard received some of the best notices. The New York Times wrote, "The very best song of all, and perhaps the best performance as well, is Miss Vigard in the stony and touching saga of a teenybopper, 'Frank Mills.' Miss Vigard looks like an ancient 12-year-old; she sings in a clear, clean style that cuts most satisfyingly through the general lushness." Newsweek noted, "Angel-faced Kristen Vigard is the nicest of [the] cast."

In May 1979, she returned to Broadway as Johanne in Martin Charnin and Thomas Meehan's I Remember Mama with Liv Ullmann. Although the show was the last musical to be written by Richard Rodgers, it received mixed reviews.

=== Television and film ===
Vigard made her television debut alongside Henry Fonda in the 1978 TV movie Home to Stay. In 1980, Vigard was cast as Morgan Richards on the daytime soap opera Guiding Light. That same year, she appeared on the cover of People as one of the "Torrid Teens on the Soaps". She remained on the show for two years.

Vigard made her film debut in the 1979 film, The Black Stallion. In 1983, she appeared in her first major screen role alongside Robin Williams, playing Walter Matthau's daughter in The Survivors. Although the film itself was panned by critics, People magazine described Vigard's performance as "appealing."

She continued her work on television in a 1983 episode of Fame, a 1984 TV movie License to Kill, and a two-year recurring role on One Life to Live as Joy O'Neill from 1984 to 1985. In 1986, Vigard guest starred along with Christian Slater on The Equalizer in the episode "Joyride", which commented on the issue of drug addiction. In 1987 she appeared in an episode of Amazing Stories.

=== Music ===
Vigard then pursued a music career, initially singing solo in Paris subway stations before joining the underground music scene in Los Angeles. In the late 1980s and early 1990s she recorded and toured as a backup singer with the Red Hot Chili Peppers and Fishbone, appearing on the former's Mother's Milk (1989) and One Hot Minute (1995) and Fishbone's The Reality of My Surroundings (1991) and Give a Monkey a Brain and He'll Swear He's the Center of the Universe (1993).

In 1988, she released her eponymous debut album on the Private Music label. It was chosen as one of the top 100 albums of the year by Playboy and reached the Billboard Top 30. Reviewer Tim Marklein of The Stanford Daily gave the album an "A+" and compared her to Paul Simon, writing that "Twenty-six year old Kristen Vigard may look young, but her debut album shows that she has as much experience merging different forms of music as Paul Simon."

In 1996, she sang the lead vocals for Illeana Douglas for the film Grace of My Heart. Vigard's second album, God, Loves and Angels, released in 2004, includes Vigard's performance of "God Give Me Strength", which was not included on the soundtrack CD.

==== New White Trash ====
From 2009 through 2013, Vigard was a member of the band New White Trash, a downtempo acoustic rock band. Vigard was a founding member, along with Michael C. Ruppert, drummer Andy Kravitz, and guitarist Doug Lewis. The band released two albums, Doublewide (2011) and Age of Authority (2013). Following Ruppert's suicide in 2014, the band announced its intention to release a tribute album. Beyond the Rubicon was released on December 11, 2014.

== Personal life ==
Vigard lives with her husband and her daughter in Taos, New Mexico, where she has appeared in local plays.

== In popular culture ==
Vigard's short-lived role as Annie is mentioned in the 2008 film Phoebe in Wonderland.

== Selected discography ==
- Kristen Vigard (1988). Kristen Vigard. Private Music/BMG.
- Kristen Vigard (2004). God, Loves and Angels. Cosmic Fish Media/Bejole Music.

=== With Red Hot Chili Peppers ===
- Red Hot Chili Peppers (1989). Mother's Milk. EMI Records.
- Red Hot Chili Peppers (1995). One Hot Minute. Warner Bros.

=== With Fishbone ===
- Fishbone (1991). The Reality of My Surroundings. Columbia Records.
- Fishbone (1993). Give a Monkey a Brain and He'll Swear He's the Center of the Universe. Columbia Records.

=== With New White Trash ===
- New White Trash (2011). Doublewide. Venice Arts Club. Archived from the original on April 26, 2015.
- New White Trash (2013). Age of Authority. Venice Arts Club. Archived from the original on May 5, 2015.
- New White Trash (2014). Beyond the Rubicon. Venice Arts Club. Archived from the original on May 5, 2015.

Music videos

- New White Trash (2011). Realize the Lie. Venice Arts Club. Archived from the original on December 15, 2021.
- New White Trash (2012). Hello Life. Venice Arts Club.

=== Other credits ===
- Jill Sobule (1995). "Supermodel". Jill Sobule. Lyrics by David Baerwald, David Kitay, Brian MacLeod, Kristen Vigard. Lava / Atlantic.
- Kristen Vigard (1996a). "A Boat on the Sea". Grace of My Heart (Original Soundtrack). Composed by David Baerwald and Larry Klein. MCA.
- Kristen Vigard (1996b). "Man from Mars". Grace of My Heart (Original Soundtrack). Composed by Joni Mitchell. MCA Records.
- Weapon of Choice (2002). Illoominutty. Kristen Vigard (backup vocals). Nuttsactor 5.
- Venice Arts Club (2010). "OK Sunshine". Venice Arts Club —. Vol. V2. Vocals by Kristen Vigard and Doug Lewis. Venice Arts Club.
