= Unfabulous and More =

Soundtrack album by Emma Roberts
- Released: September 27, 2005
- Recorded: 2004–2005
- Studios: Phase One Studios (Toronto, Ontario, Canada), Pie Studios (Glen Cove, New York), House of Blues (Encino, California), and Unpronounceable Symbol (Encino, California)
- Genre: Pop rock
- Length: 36:01
- Label: Columbia
- Producers: Brian Malouf, Marshall Altman

Singles from Unfabulous and More
- 1. "I Wanna Be" Released: September 2005; 2. "Dummy" Released: December 2005

Professional ratings
Review scores
Source	Rating
AllMusic	4/5 stars
Common Sense Media	3/5 stars

Unfabulous and More is the soundtrack album for the television series Unfabulous, performed by American actress Emma Roberts. It was released on September 27, 2005.

The album contains songs from the show's first season, as well as several new songs. The tracks "I Wanna Be" and "Dummy" were both released as singles. The song "Mexican Wrestler", which was sung by Emma in the episode "The 66th Day", was originally on Jill Sobule's 2000 album Pink Pearl.

This album was one of the 52 from Sony BMG that were on the company's list of CDs shipped with the computer software known as Extended Copy Protection (XCP). Sony discontinued use of the technology on November 11, 2005, and recalled this and other titles affected by XCP.

== Track listing ==
1. "I Wanna Be" (Daniel Holter, Mike Standal) - 3:14
2. "Punch Rocker" (Jill Sobule) – 2:33
3. "Say Goodbye to Jr. High" (Anjulie Persaud) – 3:39
4. "I Have Arrived" (Jeannie Lurie, Holly Mathis, Lindsay Sorensen, Christopher Sorensen) – 3:23
5. "94 Weeks (Metal Mouth Freak)" (Sobule) – 3:49
6. "This Is Me" (Marshall Altman, Emma Roberts, Erin Workman) – 3:40
7. "Dummy" (Franne Golde, Kasia Livingston, Andrew Williams) – 3:08
8. "Mexican Wrestler" (Robin Eaton, Sobule) – 5:02
9. "We Are Gonna Happen" (Dave Derby, Colleen Fitzpatrick, Michael Kotch) – 3:35
10. "New Shoes" (Sue Rose, Sobule) – 2:16
11. "Look in the Mirror" (Limited Too and international digital bonus track) – 1:05

== Personnel ==
- Paul Bushnell – bass
- Julian Coryell – guitar
- Dorian Crozier – drums
- Zach Danziger – percussions
- Nick Dimichino – bass
- Dean Drouilliard – guitars
- John Hampson – guitars
- Keely Hawkes-Pressly – background vocals
- Daniel Holter – keys
- Sean Hurley – bass
- Jon Levine – piano, keyboards
- Gabriel Mann – keyboards
- Jim McGorman – keys
- Dino Meneghin – guitar
- Samantha Murphy – background vocals
- Yurko Mychaluk – guitars
- Lee Nadel – bass
- Anjulie Persaud – background vocals, percussion
- Marc Rogers – bass
- Jill Sobule – acoustic guitar, background vocals
- Lindsay Sorensen – background vocals
- Michael Standal – electric guitar
- Aaron Sterling – drums
- Vince Tattanelli – drums
- Denton Whited – drums
- Erin Wirkman – background vocals

== Chart performance ==
Chart (2005)	Peak position
US Heatseekers Albums (Billboard)	46
US Kid Albums (Billboard)	10
