= California Years =

Studio album by Jill Sobule
- Released: April 14, 2009
- Length: 49:58
- Label: Pinko
- Producer: Don Was

Jill Sobule chronology
Underdog Victorious (2004)	California Years (2009)	A Day At The Pass (2011)

Professional ratings
Review scores
Source	Rating
AllMusic	link
Blurt	(favorable) link
Robert Christgau	link
Entertainment Weekly	B+ link
PopMatters	link
Rolling Stone	link
The Washington Post	(favorable) link

California Years is the seventh studio album by American singer-songwriter Jill Sobule, released on April 14, 2009, on Sobule's own label, Pinko Records. The album was produced by Don Was and financed completely by fan donations to Sobule's website jillsnextrecord.com.

== Track listing ==
All songs written by Robin Eaton and Jill Sobule except where noted.

1. "Palm Springs" – 4:42
2. "San Francisco" – 4:50
3. "Nothing to Prove" – 3:09
4. "Where Is Bobbie Gentry?" – 3:11
5. "A Good Life" – 3:05
6. "Sweetheart" – 3:01
7. "Empty Glass" (Sobule, Elise Thoron) – 3:10
8. "League of Failures" – 4:47
9. "Wendell Lee" – 4:42
10. "Bloody Valentine" – 3:38
11. "Mexican Pharmacy" – 2:59
12. "While You Were Sleeping" (Bill Demain, Sobule) – 3:06
13. "Spiderman" (Bill Demain, Sobule) – 3:20
14. "The Donor Song" (Sobule) – 1:45

Three tracks recorded for prospective inclusion on California Years did not make the final cut: "Mom", "The Rapture" and "Gotta Get Me Some" (the latter track, like "Empty Glass", originally written for the musical Prozak and the Platypus).

== Personnel ==
- Dave Carpenter – vocals, piano
- Bill DeMain – guitar
- Robin Eaton – vocals
- Mark Goldenberg – vocals, guitar, slide guitar, piano
- Bryan Head – vocals
- Jim Keltner – drums
- Greg Leisz – vocals, dobro, mandolin
- Jamie Muhoberac – organ
- Geoff Pearlman – vocals
- Benmont Tench – organ
- Jill Sobule – vocals, acoustic guitar, banjo, piano
