= The Folk Years 2003–2003 =

Studio album by Jill Sobule
- Released: 2004

Jill Sobule chronology
Pink Pearl (2000)	The Folk Years 2003–2003 (2004)	Underdog Victorious (2004)

The Folk Years 2003–2003 is the fifth album by Jill Sobule, released independently in 2004. The CD contains four covers: "Survivor" (originally recorded by Destiny's Child), "Que Sera, Sera (Whatever Will Be, Will Be)" (originally recorded by Doris Day), "Sunrise, Sunset" (from the musical Fiddler on the Roof), and "Don't Let Us Get Sick" (originally recorded by Warren Zevon). Three tracks, "Thank Misery," "Under the Disco Ball," and "Angel/Asshole," were rerecorded for Sobule's next album, Underdog Victorious.

== Track listing ==
1. "Survivor"
2. "Thank Misery"
3. "Que Sera, Sera (Whatever Will Be, Will Be)"
4. "Under the Disco Ball"
5. "Sunrise, Sunset"
6. "Sonny Liston"
7. "Don't Drop Dead"
8. "Angel/Asshole"
9. "Shoreline"
10. "Sweet Li'l Summer"
11. "War Correspondent"
12. "Don't Let Us Get Sick"
13. "Lucky in Love" [hidden track]

== Zevon tribute ==
The late Warren Zevon's "Don't Let Us Get Sick" is included on both this acoustic album and on a posthumous Zevon tribute record. Sobule toured twice with Zevon, with whom she shares a penchant for sardonic storytelling. The two artists frequently accompanied one another during each other's sets, and Zevon was known on multiple occasions to take the lead vocal on Sobule's "I Kissed a Girl". Sobule has said that part of their bond came from the fact that she, like Zevon, was best known for a single fluke hit (Zevon's being "Werewolves of London").
