= Mind the Gap (2004 film) =

2004 American comedy-drama film

- Theatrical release poster
- Directed by: Eric Schaeffer
- Written by: Eric Schaeffer
- Produced by: Terence Michael; Chip Hourihan; Bob Kravitz; Noel Ashman
- Starring: Alan King; Elizabeth Reaser; Eric Schaeffer; Charles Parnell; Jill Sobule
- Cinematography: Marc Blandori
- Edited by: Mitchel Stanley
- Music by: Veigar Margeirsson
- Production company: Terence Michael Productions
- Distributed by: Sky Island Films
- Release date: March 13, 2004 (SXSW)
- Running time: 134 minutes
- Country: United States
- Language: English
- Box office: $10,637

Mind the Gap is a 2004 American multi-story comedy-drama film, written and directed by Eric Schaeffer. The film moves back and forth between five separate stories that interconnect with each other by the end of the film. The film stars Elizabeth Reaser, Eric Schaeffer, Jill Sobule in her final film, Charles Parnell, John Heard, Vera Farmiga, and Alan King in his last film role.

== Plot ==
Five New Yorkers come to terms with the bitter-sweet reality of life in this collection of intertwined stories. Single dad Sam (Eric Schaeffer) struggles to raise his son; elderly Herb (Alan King) honors a deceased friend with a perilous act; musician Jody (Jill Sobule) worries what heartache will do to her pacemaker; free-spirited Malissa (Elizabeth Reaser) cares for her sick mother; and John (Charles Parnell) reels from his failed marriage.

== Cast ==
- Alan King as Herb Schweitzer
- Elizabeth Reaser as Malissa Zubach
- Charles Parnell as John McCabe
- Jill Sobule as Jody Buller
- Eric Schaeffer as Sam Blue
- Kim Raver as Vicki Walters
- Christopher Kovaleski as Rocky Blue
- Mina Badie as Dana
- Yolonda Ross as Deniese
- Todd Weeks as Dr. John Albertson
- John Heard as Henry Richards
- Dorothi Fox as Grandma
- Vera Farmiga as Allison Lee

== Production ==
The film was written and directed by Eric Schaeffer, who also stars in the film. It was produced by Terence Michael, Chip Hourihan, Bob Kravitz and Noel Ashman. The film was distributed by Sky Island Films, Showtime Networks and 111 Pictures, and premiered at South by Southwest on March 13, 2004. It was later released in New York on September 24, 2004. Most of the film was shot in Vermont, including the North Carolina scenes and most of the interiors. Exterior shots were also filmed in New York City and Tucson, Arizona.

== Reception ==
=== Box office ===
The film made $5,503 in its opening weekend, after being released to one theater screen in New York City. Mind the Gap went on to gross a total of $10,637 domestically, from the limited release in the United States.

=== Critical response ===
The film received generally mixed reviews from film critics. Mind the Gap holds a 59% approval rating on aggregator website Rotten Tomatoes, based on 17 critical reviews, with an average rating of 5.6/10. On Metacritic the film scored a 46 out of 100 rating, based on 10 reviews, indicating "mixed or average reviews". Joe Leydon of Variety wrote: "Warm-hearted but clear-eyed indie effort richly repays audience patience during deliberately paced and provocatively allusive early scenes with a cumulative emotional impact that is immensely satisfying."

Frank Scheck of The Hollywood Reporter wrote: "An overly ambitious, overly complex and overly long opus that bites off more than it can chew." Ella Taylor of LA Weekly gave a positive review, writing: "You can see what's coming five minutes into the movie, but capable acting lends it a certain superficial charm." Anita Gates of The New York Times wrote: "Mr. Schaeffer takes his time cryptically setting up his characters' situations in the film. When they finally start moving toward one another and revealing their secrets, the revelations flow like diet soda. The improbable ending is oddly satisfying. But don't ask moviegoers to believe that Sam and Malissa would both find parking spaces right in front of Lenox Hill Hospital."

At the 2004 South by Southwest Film Festival, the film won the Special Jury Award for Narrative Feature award for Schaeffer.
