= I Kissed a Girl (Jill Sobule song) =

1995 song performed by Jill Sobule

Single by Jill Sobule

from the album Jill Sobule
- B-side: "Resistance Song"
- Released: May 2, 1995
- Genre: Folk-pop
- Length: 3:13
- Label: Atlantic; Lava
- Songwriters: Jill Sobule; Robin Eaton
- Producer: Brad Jones

Jill Sobule singles chronology
"Living Color" (1990)	"I Kissed a Girl" (1995)	"Supermodel" (1995)

Music video
- "I Kissed a Girl" on YouTube

"I Kissed a Girl" is a song by American singer-songwriter Jill Sobule, released on May 2, 1995 by Atlantic and Lava Records, as the first single from her second album, Jill Sobule (1995). The song reached number 20 on the US Billboard Modern Rock Tracks chart, numbers 67 and 68 on the US Billboard Hot 100 and Cash Box Top 100 charts, and number 36 on the Australian ARIA Singles Chart. In Canada, it debuted and peaked at number 15 on the newly established RPM Alternative 30 chart. The accompanying music video featured Italian model Fabio playing Sobule's heterosexual love interest. It parodies his romance novel covers, and features young women in 1960s-style hair and dresses.

== Track listings and formats ==
- CD single
1. "I Kissed a Girl" – 3:13
2. "Resistance Song" – 2:59
3. "I Kissed a Girl" (live) – 3:02
- Cassette single
1. "I Kissed a Girl" – 3:13
2. "Resistance Song" – 2:59

== Charts ==
Chart (1995)	Peak position
Australia (ARIA)	36
Canada Rock/Alternative (RPM)	15
US Billboard Hot 100	67
US Modern Rock Tracks (Billboard)	20
US Cash Box Top 100	68

== Release history ==
Region	Date	Format(s)	Label(s)	Ref.
United States	May 2, 1995	Contemporary hit radio	Atlantic; Lava	
United States	May 8, 1995	Rock radio	Atlantic; Lava	
Australia	August 21, 1995	CD	Atlantic; Lava	

== Katy Perry song of the same name ==
In 2008, the song received renewed attention after Katy Perry released a song with the same title. Some music critics unfavorably compared Perry's song to Sobule's due to their titles. In a 2009 interview with The Rumpus, Sobule criticized Perry, stating, "Fuck you Katy Perry, you fucking stupid, maybe 'not good for the gays,' title-thieving, haven't heard much else, so not quite sure if you're talented, fucking little slut." Sobule later claimed that her comments were meant to be facetious. She stated that she "rambled on with a string of over the top dumb-ass profanities, purposely out of character and completely in jest ... I have never really been angry or had ill feelings towards Katy herself. I was actually in a small way happy to not be the 'Kissed a Girl' girl anymore".
