= Things Here Are Different =

Studio album by Jill Sobule
- Released: April 17, 1990
- Genre: Pop rock
- Length: 39:45
- Label: MCA
- Producer: Todd Rundgren

Jill Sobule chronology
Things Here Are Different (1990)	Jill Sobule (1995)

Things Here Are Different is the first album by the American singer-songwriter Jill Sobule, released in 1990. It contains the singles "Living Color" and "Too Cool to Fall in Love". The album was produced by Todd Rundgren.

== Critical reception ==
Professional ratings
Review scores
Source	Rating
AllMusic	3/5 stars
Calgary Herald	B+
Select	4/5

The Calgary Herald called Sobule "a singer-songwriter with a variety of honest, intelligent messages."

== Track listing ==
All songs written by Jill Sobule except as noted.

1. "Living Color" – 4:04
2. "Sad Beauty" – 3:32
3. "Too Cool to Fall in Love" (Holland, Melamed, Sobule) – 3:51
4. "Life Goes on Without You" – 4:20
5. "Pilar (Things Here Are Different)" – 3:21
6. "Evian" (Eaton, Jacobson, Sobule) – 3:16
7. "So Kind" (Bunch, Sobule) – 3:46
8. "Tell Me Your Dreams" (Eaton) – 4:01
9. "Disinformation" – 3:38
10. "Golden Cage" – 3:56
11. "The Gifted Child" – 2:00

The single, "Too Cool to Fall in Love" peaked at No. 17 on the Billboard Adult Contemporary chart.

== Personnel ==
- Jill Sobule – guitar, vocals
- Valentina Charlap-Evans – violin, viola
- Carole Cowan – violin
- Emily Faxon – violin
- Eric Jacobson – synthesizer, piano, glockenspiel, keyboards, recorder, handclapping
- Sid McGinnis – guitar
- Michael Rhodes – bass guitar, guitar
- Todd Rundgren – guitar
- Steve Satten – trumpet
- Susan Seligman – cello
- Michael Shrieve – percussion, drums
- Geraldo Velez – percussion, bongos, conga, handclapping

Production

- Producer: Todd Rundgren
- Engineer: Todd Rundgren
- Mixing: Todd Rundgren
- Mastering: Greg Calbi
- Project coordinator: Lee Dannay
- String arrangements: Eric Jacobson
- Photography: Michael Miller
- Make-up: Jeanine Greville-Morris
- Stylists: Susan Tobman, Justin Ware
