= Clueless =

1995 film by Amy Heckerling

- Theatrical release poster
- Directed by: Amy Heckerling
- Written by: Amy Heckerling
- Produced by: Scott Rudin; Robert Lawrence
- Starring: Alicia Silverstone
- Narrated by: Alicia Silverstone
- Cinematography: Bill Pope
- Edited by: Debra Chiate
- Music by: David Kitay
- Distributed by: Paramount Pictures
- Release date: July 19, 1995
- Running time: 97 minutes
- Country: United States
- Language: English
- Budget: $12 million
- Box office: $88 million

Clueless is a 1995 American coming-of-age teen comedy film written and directed by Amy Heckerling. It stars Alicia Silverstone and was produced by Scott Rudin and Robert Lawrence.

Loosely adapted from Jane Austen's 1815 novel Emma, the film follows a "beautiful, popular, wealthy" high school student who wants to do "good deeds". She befriends a newcomer and decides to give her a makeover while playing matchmaker for her teachers and examining her own life.

Filming took place in Southern California over a 40-day schedule. To develop an authentic depiction of 1990s teenage culture, Heckerling observed students at Beverly Hills High School and incorporated contemporary slang into the dialogue.

The film was released by Paramount Pictures on July 19, 1995. It grossed $88 million worldwide against a $12 million budget and achieved additional success in the home video market. It received positive reviews from critics and is widely regarded as one of the best teen films of all time. (Note: Attributed to multiple references:) Clueless has since developed a cult following and maintained a lasting cultural legacy. It inspired a spin-off television series and a series of books. In 2025, the film was selected for preservation in the United States National Film Registry by the Library of Congress for being "culturally, historically, or aesthetically significant".

== Plot ==
Cher Horowitz, a stylish, popular, and good-natured teenager, lives in a Beverly Hills mansion with her wealthy father, Mel, a gruff litigator; her mother died during a liposuction procedure when Cher was a baby. She attends Bronson Alcott High School with her best friend Dionne Davenport, also stylish and from a wealthy family. Dionne has a long-term relationship with popular student Murray Duvall, though Cher believes Dionne should be dating more mature men.

Josh Lucas, the socially conscious son of Mel's ex-wife from a brief marriage, visits Cher and her father during a break from college. When Cher points out they have not been linked by marriage for more than five years, Mel replies he divorced his wife, not his stepson. Cher playfully mocks Josh's idealism while Josh teases Cher for her vanity, superficiality, and selfishness.

Initially receiving poor grades on her report card, Cher renegotiates her grades with her more lenient teachers but cannot budge the hard-grading Mr. Hall. To soften him up, Cher orchestrates a romance between Mr. Hall and awkward teacher Miss Geist. As a result, he relaxes his standards, allowing Cher to renegotiate the grade. After seeing the teachers' newfound happiness, she becomes enthusiastic about doing good deeds. Cher's father professes he is prouder of her negotiation skills than if she had earned her grades.

When "clueless" transfer student Tai Frasier arrives at the school, Cher turns her into her next project. Cher and Dionne give Tai a makeover, providing their protégé newfound confidence and style. When an amiable but clumsy skateboarding slacker, Travis Birkenstock, becomes smitten with Tai, who reciprocates, the social-status-conscious Cher tries to extinguish the attraction between Tai and the “unworthy” Travis. Instead, Cher steers Tai toward handsome, popular student Elton Tiscia. However, Elton has no interest in Tai and is instead interested in Cher, whom he tries to kiss in his car after a party in Sun Valley. When Cher rebuffs him, he leaves her in a parking lot out of spite, and she is mugged at gunpoint. With no money, Cher's only choice is to call Josh to pick her up. Seeing Cher’s attempts at mentoring Tai and volunteering for charities, Josh realizes that despite her superficiality, she is sincere.

Fashion-conscious metrosexual Christian Stovitz, a handsome new student, immediately attracts Cher's attention, becoming her target for a boyfriend. When Cher goes to a party with Christian, Josh becomes protective, also attending the party. There, he gallantly rescues Tai when no one asks her to dance. Later inviting Christian to hang out watching a film at her home, Cher tries to seduce him. Christian deflects her advances and is distracted admiring the male actors in the film. After Murray informs Cher and Dionne that Christian is gay, Cher decides to remain friends with Christian, approving his taste in art and fashion.

Cher's privileged life takes a negative turn when Tai's newfound popularity strains their relationship. Additionally, when Cher fails her driving test, for the first time she cannot negotiate to change the result. Her mood worsens when Tai confesses her feelings for Josh, asking Cher's help in pursuing him. Jealous, though oblivious, Cher tells Tai that she is not right for Josh, and the two girls fall out.

Feeling "totally clueless", Cher reflects on her priorities and repeated failures to understand or appreciate the people in her life. She helps with document review on her father's legal case along with Josh, and they begin to bond. Pondering why she is bothered by Tai's romantic interest in Josh, Cher finally realizes that she is in love with him. After her epiphany, Cher begins making awkward but sincere efforts to live a more purposeful life. This includes captaining the school's Pismo Beach disaster relief effort. She accepts an invitation from Travis to a skating tournament in Long Beach, where she reconciles with Tai, who is now dating Travis.

Cher and Josh eventually realize their feelings for one another, culminating in a kiss. Some time later, Cher attends the wedding of Mr. Hall and Miss Geist, which she and Josh attend as a couple, along with Dionne, Murray, Tai, and Travis. Cher catches the wedding bouquet, and she and Josh embrace and kiss.

== Cast ==
- Alicia Silverstone as Cher Horowitz
- Paul Rudd as Josh Lucas
- Stacey Dash as Dionne Davenport
- Brittany Murphy as Tai Frasier
- Dan Hedaya as Melvin "Mel" Horowitz
- Jeremy Sisto as Elton Tiscia
- Breckin Meyer as Travis Birkenstock
- Justin Walker as Christian Stovitz
- Wallace Shawn as Mr. Wendell Hall
- Twink Caplan as Miss Toby Geist
- Julie Brown as Coach Millie Stoeger
- Donald Faison as Murray Duvall
- Elisa Donovan as Amber Mariens
- Aida Linares as Lucy
- Sabastian Rashidi as Paroudasm Banafshein
- Herb Hall as Principal
- Susan Mohun as Heather
- Nicole Bilderback as Summer Han
- Ron Orbach as DMV tester
- Sean Holland as Lawrence
- Roger Kabler as college guy
- Jace Alexander as robber
- Josh Lozoff as Logan
- Joseph D. Reitman as student

== Production ==
=== Development ===
The idea for Clueless first originated as a television pilot in 1993. Writer and director Amy Heckerling said: "Twentieth Century Fox said they wanted a show about teenagers—but not the nerds. They wanted it to be about the cool kids. The most successful character in anything I'd ever done was Jeff Spicoli in Fast Times. People think that's because he was stoned and a surfer. But that's not it. It's because he's positive. So I thought, 'I'm going to write a character who's positive and happy.' And that was Cher." Heckerling, having read the Jane Austen novel Emma in college and loving the title character's positivity, decided to write the script around an Emma-like character, saying, "I started to think, 'What's the larger context for that kind of a 'nothing can go wrong' 'always looks through rose colored glasses' kind of girl? So I tried to take all the things that were in this sort of pretty 1800s world and see what would that be like if it was in Beverly Hills."

I remembered reading Emma in college and being struck at how much it reminded me of old TV shows like Gidget. There's something so basic about it. I knew [Clueless] would be set in Beverly Hills because it's a hyper-pastel fantasy place.

— writer and director Amy Heckerling in 2012

As research for the script, Heckerling sat in on classes at Beverly Hills High School to get a feel for the student culture, commenting, "...one thing I observed was these girls in a constant state of grooming." Ken Stovitz had become Heckerling's agent at the time and told her the script had the potential to be a feature film after he read it. The finished script, which was titled "No Worries", contained the main characters that would end up in the Clueless film. Twink Caplan, Heckerling's friend who had worked with her on past projects, said film executives at Fox were wary of the story being too female-oriented to appeal to a large enough audience. "It was obvious they didn't get it. They thought the script needed more boys in it. They were afraid that if they focused on girls, we wouldn't get any guys to see it. So it went into turnaround. It was dead", said Caplan.

Six months later, the script found its way to producer Scott Rudin, who gave it his stamp of approval. Rudin's support led to increased interest in the script, and it became the subject of a bidding war between studios which was eventually won by Paramount Pictures. Heckerling was excited, as Viacom (Paramount's parent company) owned several major youth-centered television channels, such as MTV and Nickelodeon, which were suited to the film's target demographic.

=== Casting ===
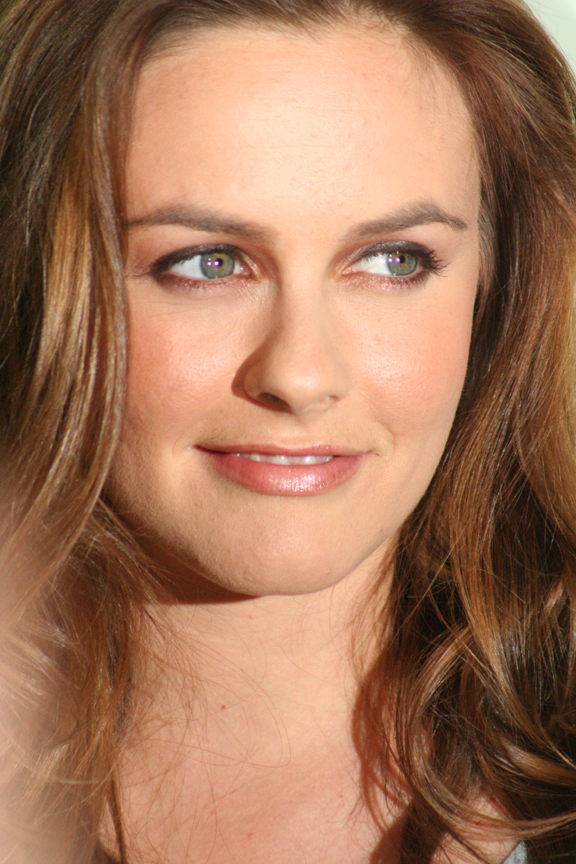
Alicia Silverstone plays Cher Horowitz, who was inspired by the title character in Jane Austen's 1816 novel Emma.

Heckerling first saw Alicia Silverstone in the Aerosmith music video for "Cryin'" and kept her in the back of her mind for the role of Cher. When the film was still in development at Fox, executives suggested Alicia Witt, Keri Russell, Tiffani Thiessen, Gwyneth Paltrow, and Angelina Jolie for the part. Heckerling met with Reese Witherspoon, who already had a few film roles to her credit. Though Silverstone only had the thriller The Crush as her previous film, the studio did not pressure Heckerling to cast big stars, and Silverstone ultimately won the role of Cher. Finalists for the role of Josh included David Kriegel, Adam Trese, Henry Thomas, Fred Savage, Adrien Brody, Jason Gedrick, David Barry Gray, Jason London, Jason Bateman, Ethan Hawke, Chad Lowe, Steve Zahn and Jeremy Sisto. Jason Wiles, Ben Affleck and Zach Braff also auditioned for the role. Matt Damon, Jeremy Davies, Patrick Dempsey and Jared Leto were uninterested in the role and passed.

Sarah Michelle Gellar was offered the role of Amber Mariens but turned it down due to her commitments to All My Children, while Zooey Deschanel auditioned for the role of Amber as well. Lauryn Hill and Trina McGee Davis were finalists for the role of Dionne. Kerry Washington, Yunoka Doyle and Essence Atkins also auditioned. A.J. Langer was the runner up for the role of Tai. Alanna Ubach was also briefly considered.

Johnny Galecki was the runner up for the role of Travis. Michael Goorjian, Ahmet Zappa and Seth Green also auditioned for the role. Terrence Howard and Larenz Tate were finalists for the role of Murray. Dave Chappelle and Seth Gilliam also unsuccessfully auditioned. Jamie Walters, Jonathan Brandis, and Raphael Petlock were finalists for the role of Christian. Jeremy Renner also auditioned.

Christopher Walken, Robert Klein, Stephen Lang, Ted Bessell, Bob Gunton, Jerry Orbach, and Harvey Keitel were considered for the role of Cher's father, Melvin Horowitz. The character of Wendell Hall, played by Wallace Shawn, was inspired by a real-life debate teacher at Beverly Hills High School and a friend of Heckerling's. Prior to full-time acting, Shawn had been a teacher and drew on his experience for his portrayal of Mr. Hall.

=== Filming ===
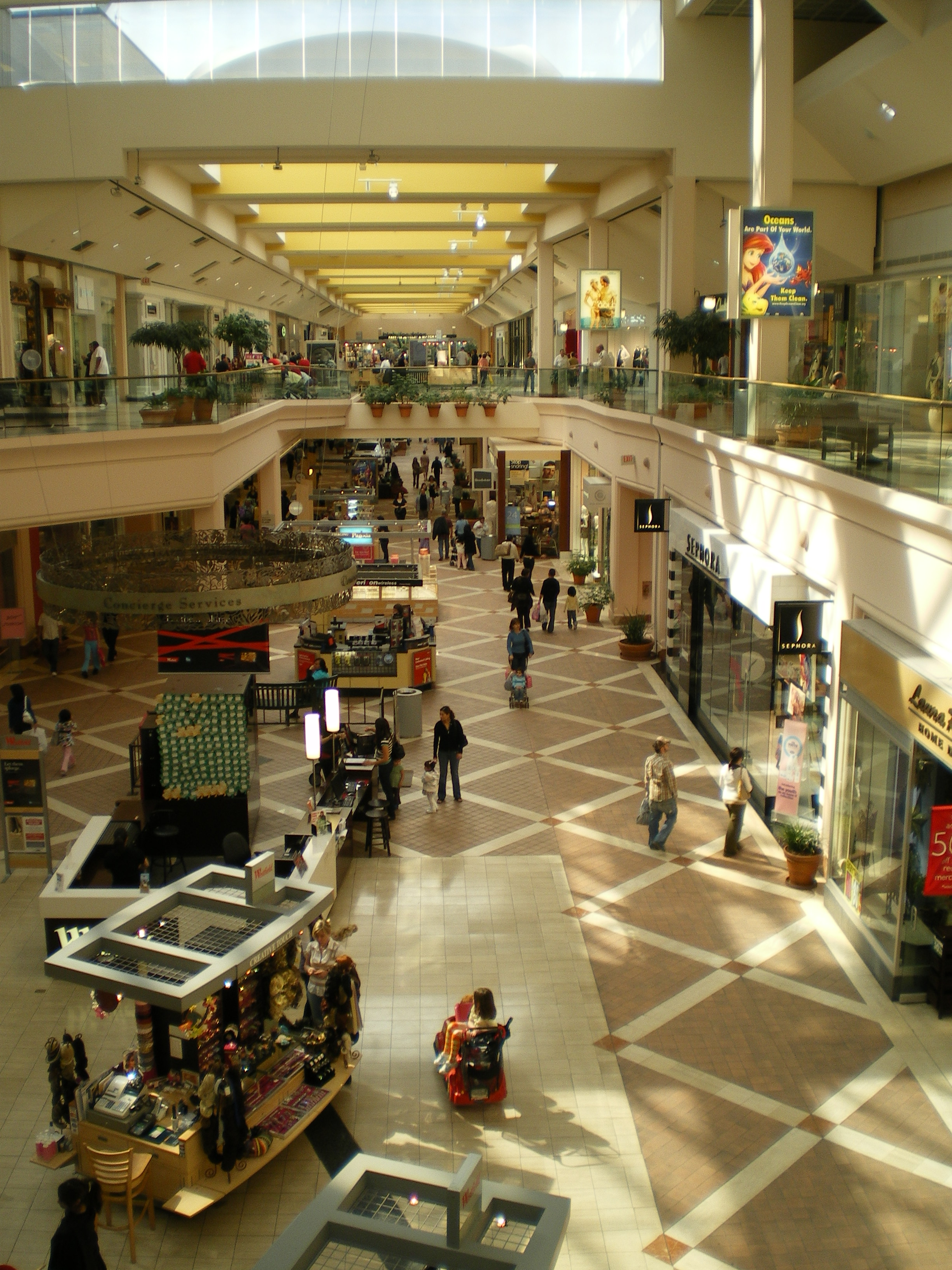
The Westfield Fashion Square in Los Angeles was used for some interior mall scenes.

Principal photography for the film began on November 21, 1994, and consisted of a 40-day filming schedule. Brittany Murphy, who was 17 at the time, required a parent or guardian present during filming.

Scenes depicting the fictional Bronson Alcott High School campus including the tennis courts, outdoor cafeteria, and the quad were filmed at Occidental College in Los Angeles. Ulysses S. Grant High School in Valley Glen provided filming locations for the school's interior sets. Other notable filming locations include the former Westside Pavilion shopping mall, Circus Liquor in North Hollywood, where Cher is mugged in her designer dress, and Rodeo Drive, featured in Cher's "crisis" scene as she dejectedly wanders around after a failed driver's test and a confrontation with Tai.

The Mighty Mighty Bosstones performance, originally an outdoor event, had to be moved inside due to rain. Paul Rudd bought everyone gifts after filming wrapped.

=== Costumes ===
Mona May did the costume designing for the film. The iconic plaid set worn by Cher Horowitz in the film was "a nod to a Catholic schoolgirl uniform, but taken to another level and, turned designer." Cher wore several designer clothes ranging from Azzedine Alaïa to Anna Sui. The "underwear" Calvin Klein dress worn by Cher was actually designed by Sui who, at the time, was an emerging designer. Calvin Klein was credited due to more brand recognition during the time.

== Release ==
=== Box office ===
The film was marketed to the youth demographic and the release was promoted on MTV. The film became a surprise sleeper hit of 1995. Clueless opened in 1,653 theaters on July 19, 1995, and grossed $10,612,443 on its opening weekend, which led to a ranking of second at the US box office behind Apollo 13. The film grossed $56,631,572 during its theatrical run in the United States and Canada, becoming the 32nd-highest-grossing film of 1995. Internationally, it grossed $31 million for a worldwide total of $88 million. The box office success brought the then-largely unknown Silverstone to international attention and earned her a $10 million, multi-picture deal with Columbia TriStar. The film developed a strong cult following after its release.

=== Critical reception ===
The film was well received by critics. On the review aggregation website Rotten Tomatoes, it holds an approval rating of 82% based on reviews from 127 critics, with an average rating of 6.9/10. The website's critics consensus reads, "A funny and clever reshaping of Emma, Clueless offers a soft satire that pokes as much fun at teen films as it does at the Beverly Hills glitterati." On Metacritic, the film has a 73 out of 100 rating based on 20 reviews, which indicates "generally favorable" reviews. Audiences polled by CinemaScore gave the film an average grade of "B+" on an A+ to F scale.

Roger Ebert of the Chicago Sun-Times gave the film three-and-a-half out of four stars. Janet Maslin of The New York Times noted, "Even if Clueless runs out of gas before it's over, most of it is as eye-catching and cheery as its star." Peter Travers of Rolling Stone contrasted the film to a more adult-oriented movie about teenagers released around the same time, Kids, stating, "The materialism in Clueless is almost as scary as the hopelessness in Kids", but concluded Clueless is "wicked good fun to be had [and] Silverstone is a winner."

=== Accolades ===
Clueless won the award for Best Screenplay at the National Society of Film Critics Awards and Alicia Silverstone won the award for Breakthrough Performance from the National Board of Review. The film was nominated for a WGA Award for Best Screenplay. The film was nominated for four MTV Movie Awards, winning for Best Female Performance and Most Desirable Female for Silverstone. Silverstone won the award for Funniest Actress in a Motion Picture at the American Comedy Awards.

In 2008, Entertainment Weekly selected Clueless as one of the "New Classics", a list of 100 best films released between 1983 and 2008; Clueless was ranked 42nd. That year, the publication also named it the 19th-best comedy of the past 25 years. The film is ranked as number 7 on Entertainment Weekly's list of the 50 best high school films.

The City of Beverly Hills has embraced its association with the film. On July 19, 2025, the city hosted an outdoor screening at La Cienaga Park for the 30th anniversary of the film's release. At the event, mayor of Beverly Hills, Sharona Nazarian, officially declared July 19 "Clueless Day."

== Comparison to Emma ==
Clueless is a loose adaptation of Jane Austen's 1815 novel Emma, and many of its characters have counterparts in the novel.

- Cher Horowitz/Emma Woodhouse: Cher is representative of the main character Emma Woodhouse. Spunky, carefree, entitled, perpetually single, and matchmaker extraordinaire, both Cher and Emma enjoy the satisfaction of helping those who are without love find a perfect match. This is first seen when she and Dionne pair Miss Geist and Mr. Hall. However, this is more prominently reflected when Cher does everything in her power to pair her newest friend, Tai. While both Emma and Cher mean well in their matchmaking attempts, neither of them realizes the depths of her actions nor her feelings towards Josh/Mr. Knightley until Tai/Harriet asks her to set her up with Josh/Mr. Knightley.
- Josh Lucas/Mr. Knightley: Cher's former stepbrother, whom she finds utterly repulsive. At the beginning of the movie, she states that she has no positive feelings towards Josh in the slightest. The two bicker continually. However, as the movie progresses, Josh is shown to be more caring and considerate towards Cher, becoming defensive towards her choices of men and in life. In the novel, Mr. Knightley is the brother of Emma's sister's husband and is Emma's only critic. Cher/Emma and Josh/Mr. Knightley eventually realize they are in love.
- Tai Frasier/Harriet Smith: Tai, representative of the young, fair, and socially awkward Harriet Smith, is a newcomer to Bronson Alcott High School. Soon after, she is swept off her feet by both Cher and Dionne as they help her (unintentionally) become the most popular girl in school, to Cher's dismay. At the beginning of the film, Tai is attracted to Travis, a well-meaning, skateboard-riding, pot-smoking social recluse. Harriet is likewise attracted to humble farmer Robert Martin. Each is pressured by Cher/Emma to reject her lower-status potential lover, instead being pushed towards Elton/Mr Elton. Disastrously for Cher, Tai then falls for Josh. Emma is likewise horrified when Harriet falls in love with Mr. Knightley. In both cases, this leads to the heroine examining her own true feelings.
- Mel Horowitz/Mr. Henry Woodhouse: Similarly to Emma, Mr. Horowitz is a well known and respected man within his circle of friends, though there is one major difference between both characters: while Mr. Horowitz is shown to have little to no care for his health, Mr. Woodhouse is considered to be a valetudinarian. Both characters are shown to love their daughters greatly while not always being so forward in their affection.
- Christian Stovitz/Frank Churchill: The initially appealing love interest of Cher, whom she convinces herself she must be in love with, similar to Frank Churchill in the book. In the book, Churchill is not available to Emma because he is secretly already engaged; in the film, Christian is not available to Cher because he is gay. Both characters engage in surface-level flirting with the heroine and make her consider her own feelings.
- Travis Birkenstock/Robert Martin: A stoner and skater who has a mutual attraction with Tai; however, their attempts at courtship are derailed for a time by Cher's attempt to set Tai up with Elton. Travis is an underachiever, is constantly late for class and often receives poor grades. In the book, Emma considers Martin, a farmer, to be beneath Harriet.
- Elton Tiscia/Mr. Elton: Elton is a popular student whom Cher attempts to fix up with Tai. As is the case with the Elton from the book, he is not interested in Tai/Harriet and mistakenly believes that Cher/Emma is interested in him.
- Amber Mariens/Mrs. Elton: Cher's antagonist, who is implied to be dating Elton after Cher turns down his advance, similar to Mr. Elton taking a wife after Emma rejects him.
- Miss Geist/Miss Taylor and Mr. Hall/Mr. Weston: The initial targets of Cher's matchmaking. In the book, Miss Taylor was Emma’s governess and married Mr. Weston.

== Home media ==
Clueless was released on VHS and LaserDisc on December 19, 1995, by Paramount Home Video. It ended up in the top 20 for both video rental and video sales for 1996 in the United States. It was released on DVD on October 19, 1999. The special features solely included two theatrical trailers.

The film was reissued in a special 10th-anniversary "Whatever! Edition" DVD on August 30, 2005. The new issue included featurettes and cast interviews, including:The Class of '95 (a look at the cast), Creative Writing (Amy Heckerling talks about the script), Fashion 101 (how filmmakers invented the trendsetting style of Clueless), Language Arts (the director and cast members give facts on the groundbreaking slang and how Clueless revived Valspeak slang), Suck and Blow (how to play the game depicted in the Sun Valley party scene), Driver's Ed, We're History (stories from cast and crew of Clueless), and two theatrical trailers.

It was released on Blu-ray on May 1, 2012. Special features from the "Whatever! Edition" of 2005 were carried over to the Blu-ray and included a new trivia track.

The film was remastered in 4K for its 30th anniversary and released on Ultra HD Blu-ray, digital download and a remastered Blu-ray on July 8, 2025, alongside a theatrical reissue from June 29–30.

== Soundtrack ==
Clueless: Original Motion Picture Soundtrack

Soundtrack album by David Kitay
- Released: 1995; December 7, 2006 (CD)
- Recorded: 1994–1995
- Length: 51:26
- Label: Capitol

Clueless: Original Motion Picture Soundtrack
| No. | Title | Length |
|---|---|---|
| 1. | "Kids in America" (The Muffs) | 3:24 |
| 2. | "Shake Some Action" (Cracker) | 4:25 |
| 3. | "The Ghost in You" (Counting Crows) | 3:30 |
| 4. | "Here (Squirmel Mix)" (Luscious Jackson) | 3:33 |
| 5. | "All the Young Dudes" (World Party) | 4:00 |
| 6. | "Fake Plastic Trees (acoustic version)" (Radiohead) | 4:45 |
| 7. | "Change" (Lightning Seeds) | 4:01 |
| 8. | "Need You Around" (Smoking Popes) | 3:42 |
| 9. | "Mullet Head" (Beastie Boys) | 2:53 |
| 10. | "Where'd You Go?" (The Mighty Mighty Bosstones) | 3:16 |
| 11. | "Rollin' with My Homies" (Coolio) | 4:06 |
| 12. | "Alright" (Supergrass) | 3:01 |
| 13. | "My Forgotten Favorite" (Velocity Girl) | 3:49 |
| 14. | "Supermodel" (Jill Sobule) | 3:07 |
| Total length: | | 51:26 |

=== Certifications ===
| Region | Certification | Certified units/sales |
|---|---|---|
| United States (RIAA) | Platinum | 1,000,000^{^} |
^{^} Shipments figures based on certification alone.

== Cultural impact and legacy ==
=== Cast ===
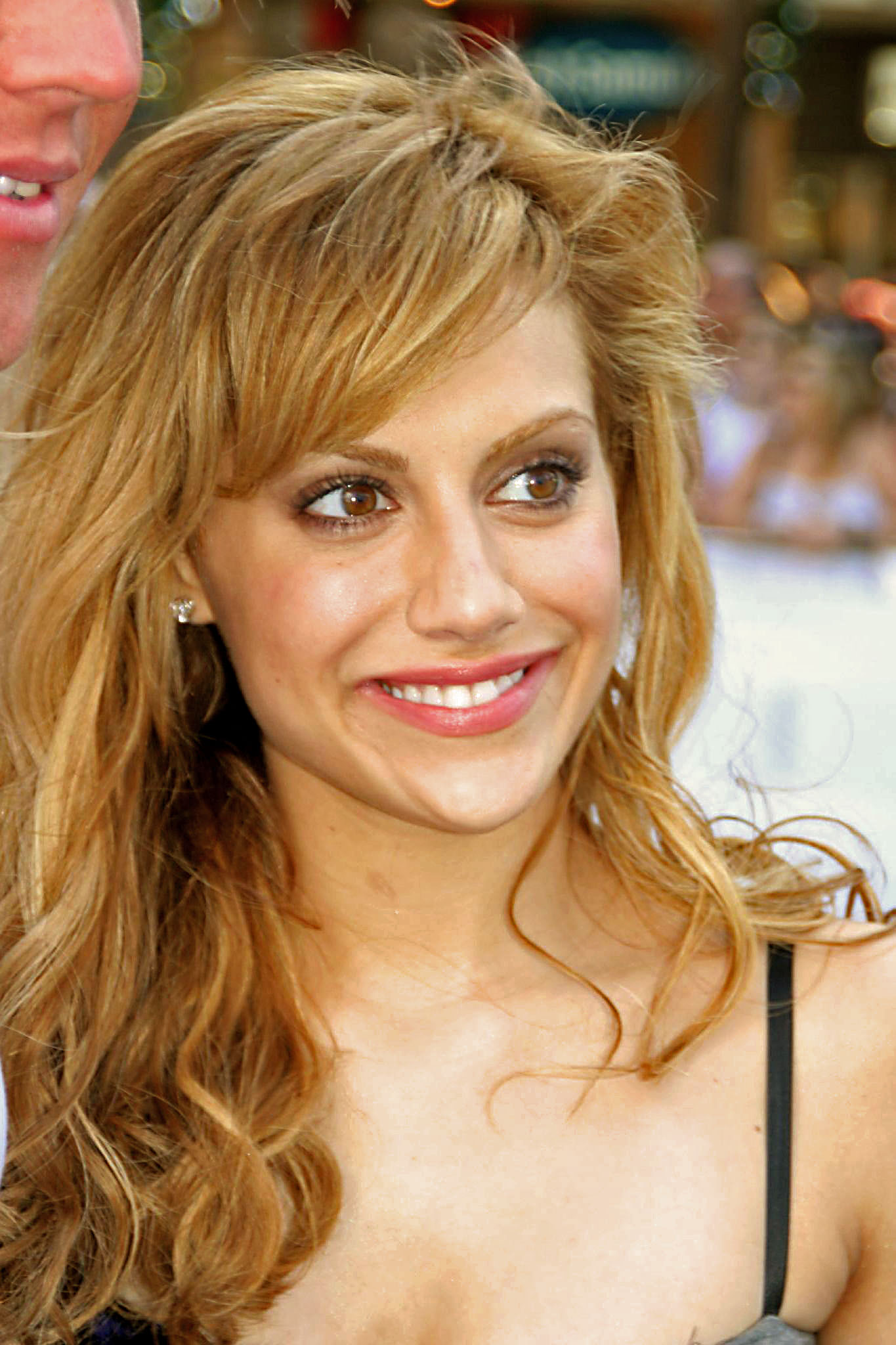
Brittany Murphy in 2006

After the death of Brittany Murphy, Silverstone stated that she "always felt connected to [Murphy] as [they] shared a very special experience in [their] lives together", and said, "I loved working with Brittany. She was so talented, so warm, and so sweet."

Heckerling later described Silverstone as having "that Marilyn Monroe thing" as a "pretty, sweet blonde who, in spite of being the American ideal, people still really like."

The surviving cast reunited in October 2012 for an issue of Entertainment Weekly.

Heckerling later reunited with both Silverstone and Wallace Shawn for the 2012 vampire comedy film Vamps.

=== Popular culture and society ===
The film was well known for the characters' catchphrases and vocabulary. Cher's verbal style is also marked by ironic contrasts between current slang and historical references, such as when she compares Tai to "those Botticelli chicks".

The film also had a strong influence on fashion trends. Fashion as a form of self-expression played an important role in the narrative and character development of the film, television series, and novels, which are topics examined by academic Alice Leppert.

Donatella Versace's fall 2018 collection was influenced by Clueless.

Clueless was the main inspiration for Australian rapper Iggy Azalea's music video for her 2014 song "Fancy" featuring Charli XCX. Many visuals and costumes inspired by the film were used in the video, which is filled with remakes of Clueless scenes. The outfits are also reinvented to channel the famous stylings of the film with a slightly modern edge. "Fancy" was shot in the same Los Angeles high school where Clueless was filmed. A June 2018 episode of Lip Sync Battle featured Silverstone miming to "Fancy", wearing Cher's yellow plaid skirt suit.

A reference to Cher's seduction of Christian is included in the music video for Simone Battle's "He Likes Boys" (2011).

In the second episode of the second season of the BBC America thriller series Killing Eve, "Nice and Neat" (2019), the Russian assassin Villanelle calls her agency and uses the codename Cher Horowitz to secretly inform her boss she is in trouble and needs to be rescued after being kidnapped.

A 2020 Discover Card commercial featured a clip from the film consisting of Cher Horowitz saying her famous phrase "Uh! As if!".

In 2023, Silverstone once again reprised the role of Cher Horowitz in a commercial for Rakuten which debuted during Super Bowl LVII.

The 2024 graphic novel Girlmode, by Magdalene Visaggio and illustrated by Paulina Ganucheau, was inspired by Clueless.

== Spin-offs and adaptations ==
=== Television ===
In 1996, the producers created a spin-off television series, serving as a sequel to the 1995 film. It followed parallel storylines of Cher and her friends. Several cast members from the film went on to star in the series, with the notable exceptions of Alicia Silverstone and Paul Rudd, whose film careers had begun to take off. Silverstone was replaced in the series with actress Rachel Blanchard. The series aired on ABC from 1996 to 1997, and later on UPN from 1997 to 1999, for three seasons.

In October 2019, it was announced that CBS would be adapting the film into a drama series and served a direct sequel to the 1995 film, disregarding the events of the 1996 series. It is said to be centered around Dionne Davenport after Cher goes missing, and is described by Deadline Hollywood as a "baby pink and bisexual blue-tinted, tiny sunglasses-wearing, oat milk latte and Adderall-fueled look at what happens when the high school queen bee Cher disappears and her lifelong number two Dionne steps into Cher's vacant Air Jordans." On August 14, 2020, the series was moved to NBCUniversal's streaming service Peacock. In May 2021, it was reported that the series would not be moving forward at Peacock and instead would be redeveloping at CBS Studios.

In April 2025, it was reported that the drama series was back on track for development for Peacock with Silverstone reprising the role. In April 2026, it was reported that the sequel series was no longer moving forward at Peacock. In July 2026, it was reported that Paramount+ greenlit the sequel instead, with Josh Schwartz, Stephanie Savage and Jordan Weiss serving as writers. The limited series is set to begin filming in Los Angeles in 2027. In November, Breckin Meyer stated that he would reprise his role as Travis and serve as one of the writers of the sequel series. He also revealed that it would consist six episodes.

=== Books ===
Simon Spotlight Entertainment spun off a collection of paperback books from 1995 to 1999 aimed at adolescent readers.

In 2015, to celebrate the film's 20th anniversary, pop culture writer Jen Chaney published a book titled As If!: The Oral History of Clueless. The book is based on exclusive interviews with Heckerling, Silverstone, and other cast and crew members. Excerpts from the book were published in Vanity Fair.

=== Comics ===
A comic book series was launched in 2017.

=== Stage musical ===
Clueless: The Musical opened in New York City on December 11, 2018, as part of The New Group's 2018–2019 season. The show was written by Heckerling and starred Dove Cameron as Cher and Dave Thomas Brown as Josh. It closed on January 12, 2019.

The musical was a jukebox musical featuring pop songs from the 1990s, though with lyrics mostly or entirely rewritten by Heckerling to fit the storyline. Songs adapted from the film's soundtrack included "Supermodel" and "Kids in America".

A new stage adaptation of Clueless opened at the Trafalgar Theatre in London's West End in February 2025. Directed by Rachel Kavanaugh, the production features a book by Amy Heckerling, music by KT Tunstall, and lyrics by Glenn Slater. Emma Flynn stars as Cher, alongside Keelan McAuley (Josh), Chyna-Rose Frederick (Dionne), and Romona Lewis-Malley (Tai).

=== Video games ===
The Clueless CD-ROM is an activity and mini game collection based on the Clueless film and television series released by Mattel Media in 1997 for Microsoft Windows and Macintosh. The CD-ROM is intended for girls age 8 and up, and includes a soundtrack, trivia, makeover and dress-up activities, and six video games.

Paramount announced in 2008 that they would release video games based on their films Clueless, Mean Girls, and Pretty in Pink. The games were planned to be released on both the PC and the Nintendo DS, but only the PC games were released. Clueless on PC was released in 2009. The cancelled Nintendo DS video game was found by YouTuber Ray Mona, and a full play-through of the game was released on her channel on April 1, 2021.

In 2017, Episode launched an interactive animated web story based on the film.
