= Jill Sobule =

American singer-songwriter (1959–2025)

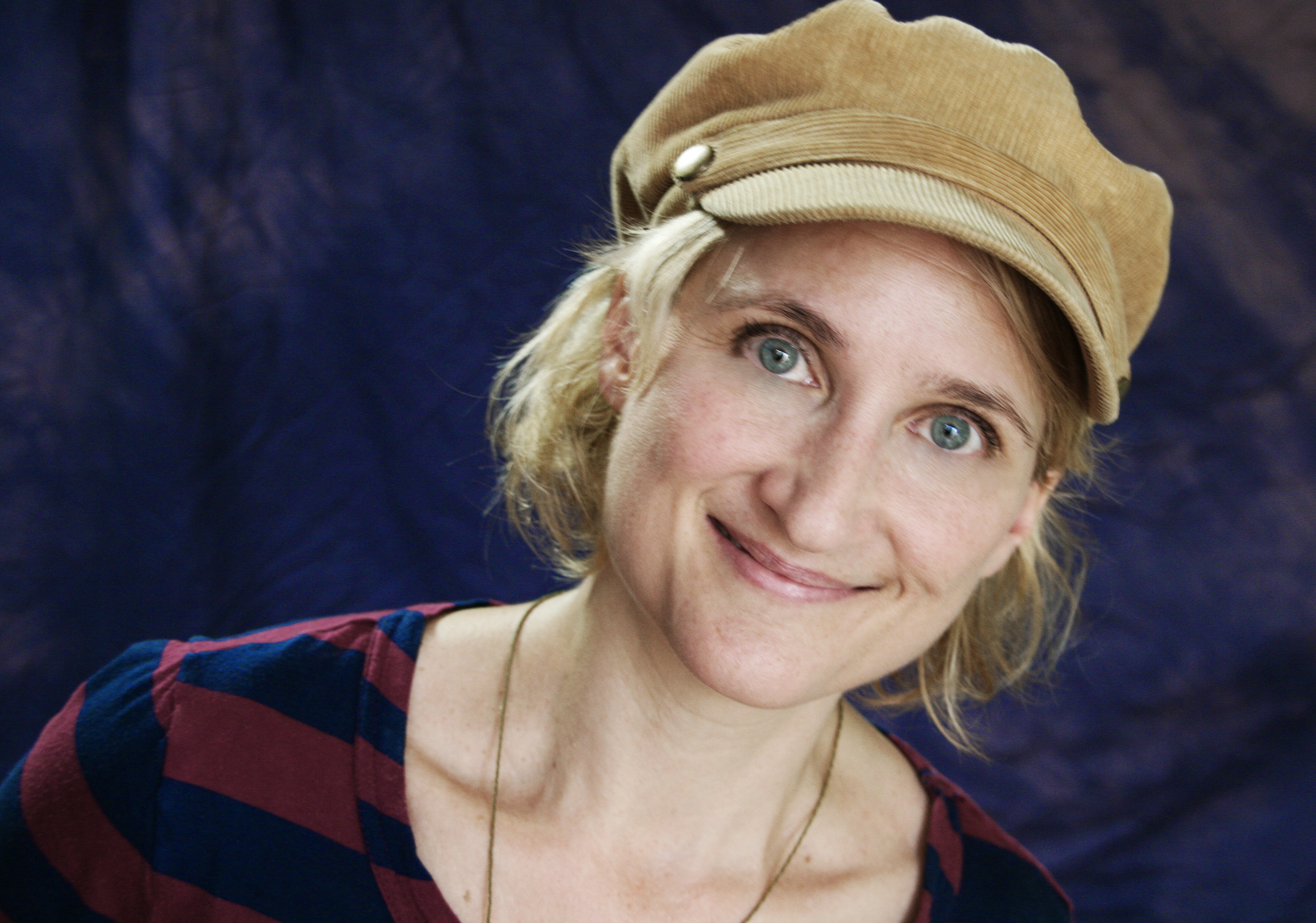
- Sobule in 2009

Background information
- Born: Jill Susan Sobule; January 16, 1959; Denver, Colorado, U.S.
- Died: May 1, 2025 (aged 66) Woodbury, Minnesota, U.S.
- Genre: Folk-pop
- Occupations: Singer; songwriter
- Instruments: Vocals; guitar
- Years active: 1986–2025
- Labels: MCA; Atlantic; Artemis; Beyond Music; Pinko
- Website: jillsobule.com

Jill Susan Sobule (/ˈsoʊbjuːl/ SOH-byool; January 16, 1959 – May 1, 2025) was an American singer-songwriter best known for the 1995 single "I Kissed a Girl", and "Supermodel" from the soundtrack of the 1995 film Clueless. Her folk-inflected compositions alternate between ironic, story-driven character studies and emotive ballads, a duality reminiscent of such 1970s American songwriters as Warren Zevon, Harry Nilsson, Loudon Wainwright III, Harry Chapin, and Randy Newman. Autobiographical elements, including Sobule's Jewish heritage and her adolescent battles with anorexia and depression, frequently occur in Sobule's writing.

In 2009, Sobule released California Years, an album funded entirely by fan donations, making her an early pioneer of crowdfunding.

== Early life ==
Sobule was born into a secular Jewish family in Denver, Colorado on January 16, 1959. Her father, Marvin Lee, was a veterinarian, and her mother, Elaine, was a musician. She had a brother, James.

Sobule attended St. Mary's Academy, while she was the only Jew there, she played the guitar during mass. She enrolled at the University of Colorado Boulder to study political science and spent her junior year in Seville, Spain, where she first performed her public gigs. Sobule later returned to the U.S. and dropped out from CU-Boulder to pursue a music career.

== Career ==
Sobule released eight studio albums of original songs, four EPs, and a greatest hits compilation album. Sobule's output also included original songs available only via the Internet, a cover of Robert Earl Keen's country holiday favorite "Merry Christmas from the Family," and a version of her late friend Warren Zevon's "Don't Let Us Get Sick", included on both Sobule's acoustic album The Folk Years 2003-2003 and on a posthumous Zevon tribute record, both released in 2004.

=== 1990s ===
Sobule's debut album, Things Here Are Different, was released by MCA Records in 1990. Produced by pop legend Todd Rundgren, the album failed to sell. She made a followup record produced by British New Wave rocker Joe Jackson (for whom she opened in 1991), but Sobule was dropped from her label and the second album was never released. She recorded another album's worth of songs, with Wendy & Lisa producing, in 1992; this was also shelved by MCA. Three of the songs from those sessions – "Trains," "Karen By Night" and "Margaret" – would be re-recorded when Sobule signed with Lava/Atlantic for her eponymous second album, released five years after her debut.

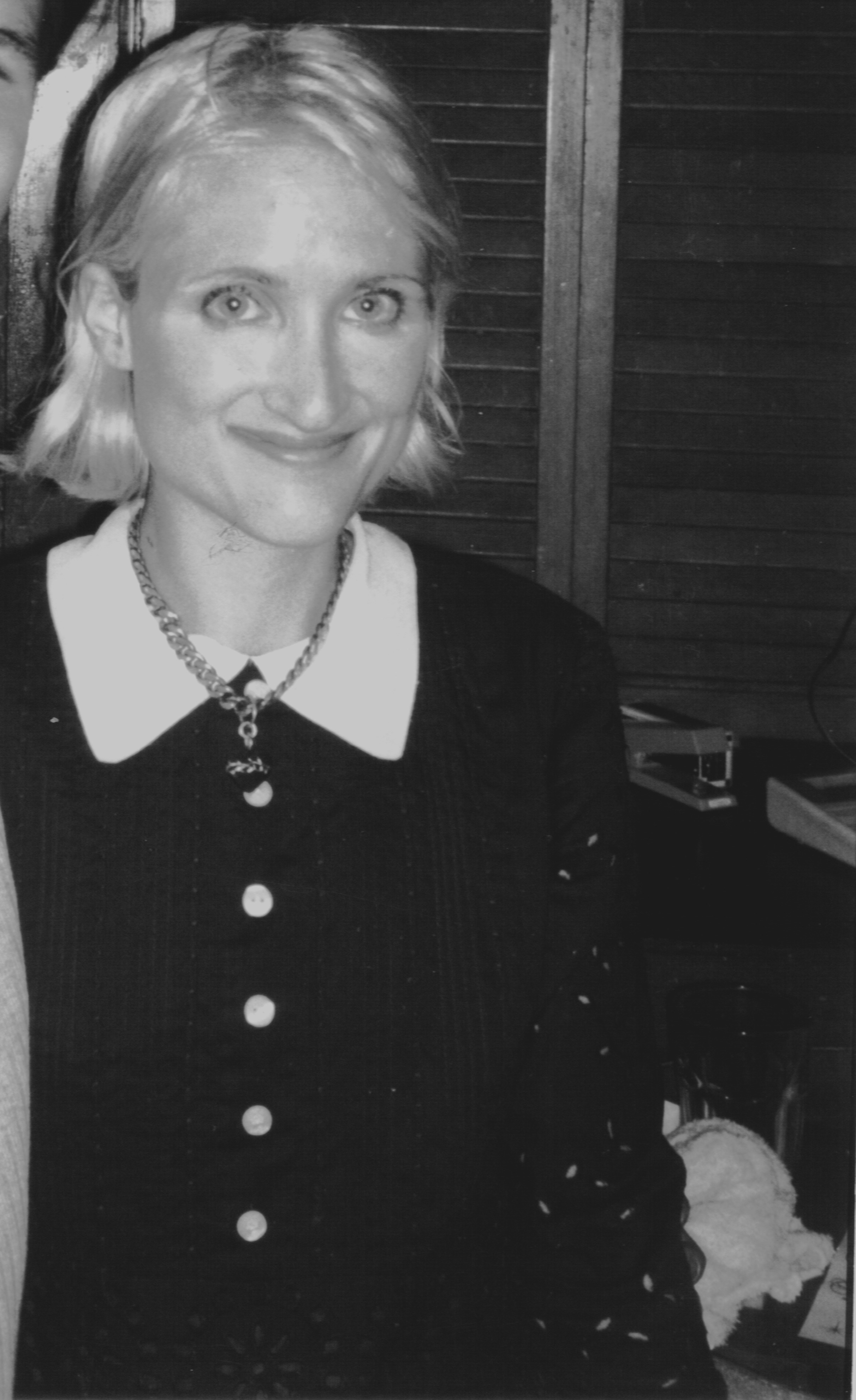
Sobule in 1995

Her 1995 album Jill Sobule established Sobule as part of a fruitful mid-90s movement of female singer-songwriters that included such artists as Lisa Loeb, Juliana Hatfield, and Alanis Morissette. The album contains Sobule's best-known composition and biggest hit, "I Kissed a Girl", a story-song about a lesbian flirtation between two suburban girlfriends which became an unlikely radio success thanks in part to a comedic music video featuring beefcake model Fabio Lanzoni. "Supermodel" (sample lyric: "I didn't eat yesterday ... and I'm not gonna eat today ... and I'm not gonna eat tomorrow ... 'Cause I'm gonna be a supermodel") managed to both send up and celebrate American teenage lifestyles, and became well known after its inclusion in 1995's hit teen comedy film Clueless.

The Jill Sobule album seemed to establish Sobule's commercial prospects, but her third album slowed that momentum while setting what was the musical and production patterns for the rest of her career. In 1997 Happy Town featured Sobule's most elaborate pop productions and contains songs about an eclectic range of topics including reactionary Christianity ("Soldiers of Christ"), the negative impact of antidepressant medication on the libido ("Happy Town"), and a track that uses Anne Frank's enforced Nazi-era hibernation as the metaphor for a love song ("Attic"). Though embraced by record reviewers from publications as diverse as The Advocate and Entertainment Weekly, Happy Town sold poorly, simultaneously solidifying Sobule's critical reputation while stalling her commercial momentum.

=== 2000s ===
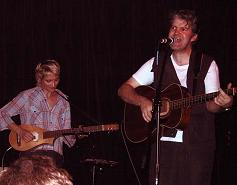
Sobule and Lloyd Cole during a concert in Seattle, Washington, in 2005

The 2000 record Pink Pearl may be Sobule's most characteristic set. It is anchored by three female character studies: "Lucy at the Gym", about an anorexic exercise addict; "Claire", about an aging lesbian aviator succumbing to Alzheimer's disease; and "Mary Kay", about Mary Kay Letourneau, the notorious real-life schoolteacher who became impregnated and was imprisoned as the result of the statutory rape of a 13-year-old male student, whom she married when he reached the age of consent.

Pink Pearl also contains some of Sobule's most directly confessional songwriting, especially the atheist's prayer "Somewhere in New Mexico" and the insomniac's lullaby "Rock Me To Sleep". Don Henley contributed a promotional quotation to the ad campaign for the album and selected Sobule to open for him during his solo tour that year.

In 2004, Sobule self-released an album of acoustic tracks titled The Folk Years 2003–2003. In the album, Sobule performed offbeat cover versions of such standards as the Doris Day theme song "Que Sera Sera" and "Sunrise, Sunset" from the Broadway musical Fiddler on the Roof.

The more elaborately recorded Underdog Victorious, also released in 2004, was one of the last albums distributed by legendary personal manager and media entrepreneur Danny Goldberg's now-defunct Artemis Records. Stalling album sales led Sobule to move to Los Angeles. She continued to write and perform prolifically and to compose original music for television, including for the popular Nickelodeon series Unfabulous.

Sobule also acted and performed her songs in writer-director Eric Schaeffer's 2004 film Mind the Gap, as a street musician in Astoria, Queens with a heart condition, who aspires to play in Manhattan.

In mid-January 2008, Sobule launched a website, jillsnextrecord.com, which sought to raise $75,000 through fan donations in order to produce, manufacture, distribute, and promote an upcoming studio album. In exchange for their donations, Sobule offered her patrons an assortment of rewards with values commensurate with the amount of the donation. These ranged from a free download of the album upon its release ($10) to the opportunity to attend a recording session and sing on the record ($10,000).

On March 8, 2008, 53 days after the public launch of the site, Sobule reached her target through donations from more than 500 people in 44 U.S. states and the District of Columbia, and 11 foreign countries. The subsequent album, California Years, was released on April 14, 2009 on Sobule's own label, Pinko Records.

=== 2010s–2020s ===
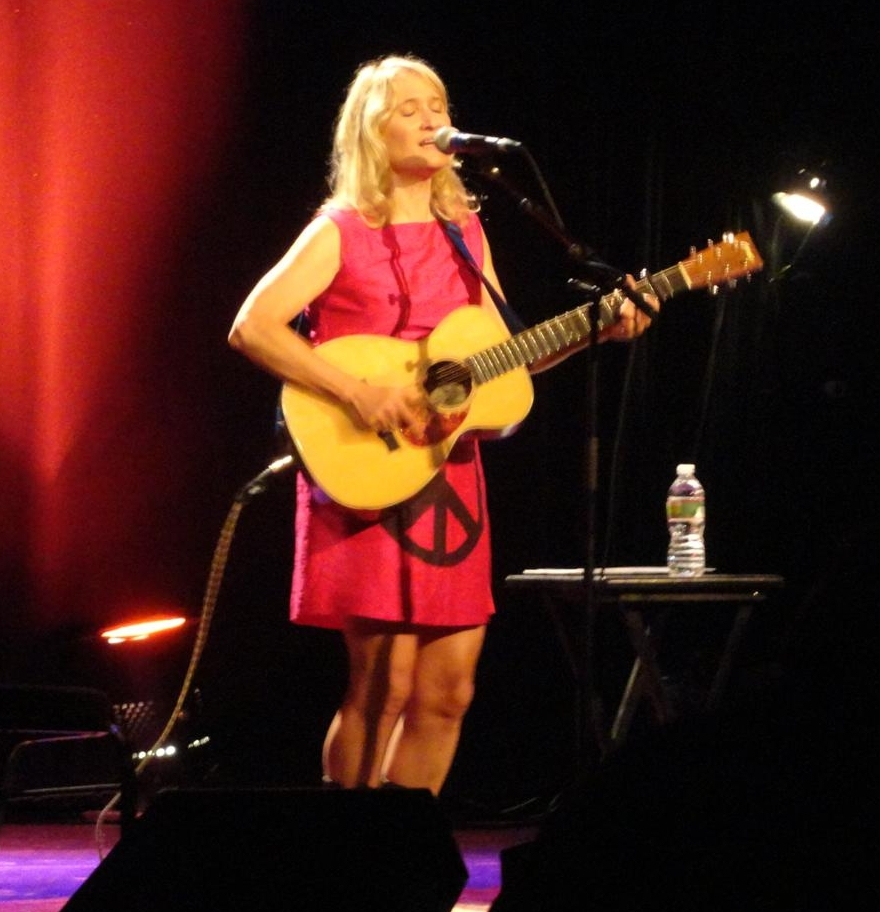
Sobule performing at the Somerville Theatre in 2013

On Sobule's next record Dottie's Charms in 2014, she put music to lyrics of her friends and favorite authors, including David Hajdu, Jonathan Lethem, Vendela Vida, and Lucy Sante, with each song relating to individual charms on an antique charm bracelet she had been given.

In 2018, Sobule again used crowdfunding to assist with the production of what would ultimately be her final album, Nostalgia Kills. Rolling Stone listed the first single from the album, "Island of Lost Things", among the 10 best new country and Americana songs.

Sobule's semi-autobiographical musical "Fuck 7th Grade" opened at the Wild Project theater in New York in October 2022 and had several runs there. It was nominated for a 2023 Drama Desk Award for Outstanding Musical. A New York Times review said the show was "for the nerds who grew up to be the cool people."

From 2020, Sobule acted as musician-in-residence at the Bayard Rustin Center for Social Justice, an LGBTQIA community center.

== Collaborations ==
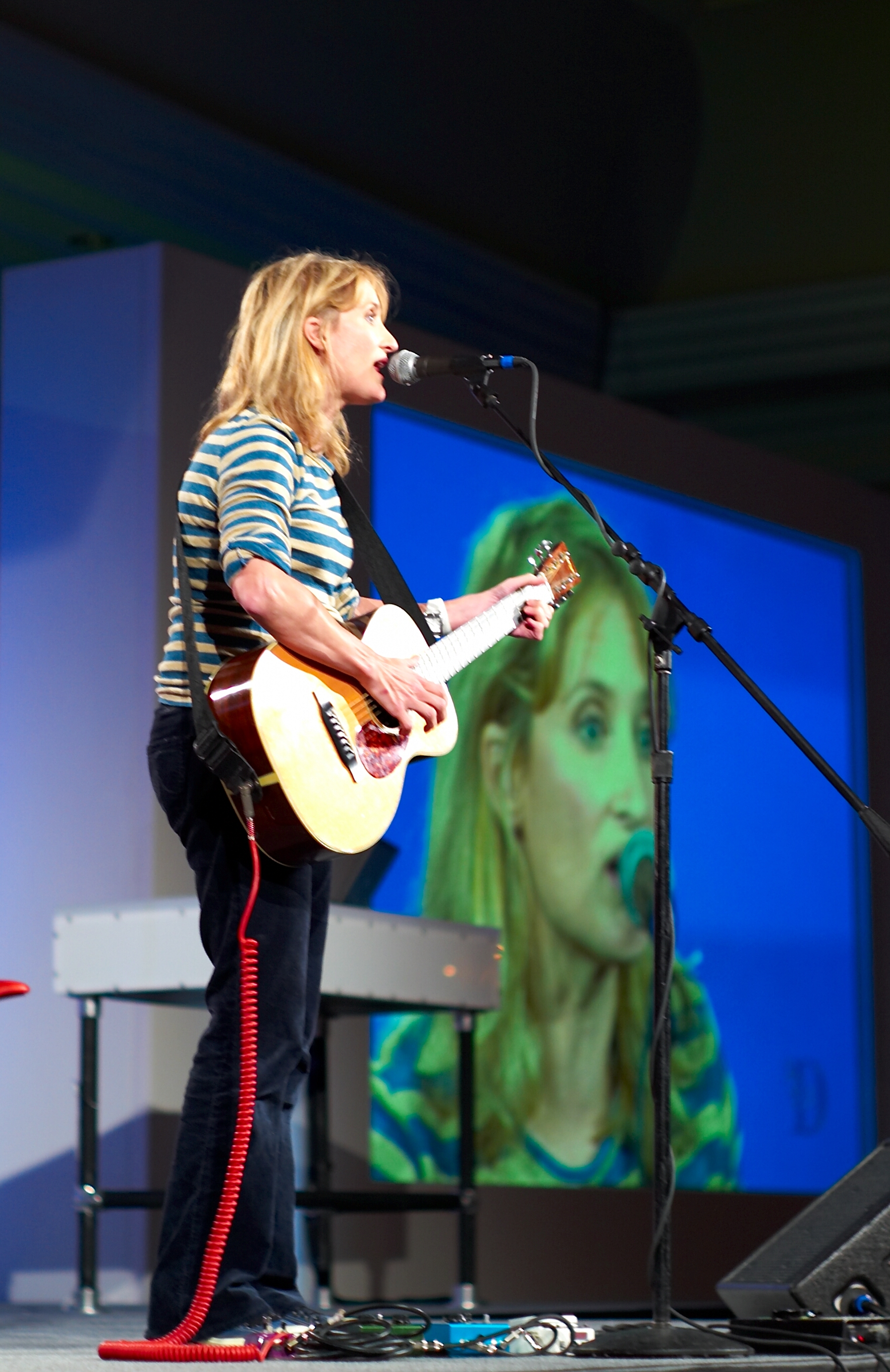
Sobule performing at D5 in Carlsbad Caverns in 2007

In the late 1990s, Sobule toured with Richard Barone as "The Richard & Jill Show". Together they wrote "Bitter" on Happy Town, "Rock Me To Sleep" on Pink Pearl and "Waiting for the Train" on Barone's Clouds Over Eden album. They also appeared together (as Mr. and Mrs. Sobule) in the underground film Next Year in Jerusalem, which featured another of their compositions, "Everybody's Queer". The pair continued to collaborate, including writing "Odd Girl Out" for Barone's 2010 album, Glow (Bar/None Records), as well as continuing to perform together. Their songs have been used on The West Wing, Dawson's Creek, Felicity, South of Nowhere, and other television shows. In 2018, Barone produced and sang backing vocals on "Island of Lost Things" on Sobule's album Nostalgia Kills.

From 1997 until 1998, Sobule was a member of Lloyd Cole's short-lived band The Negatives.

In the fall of 2003, Sobule joined Steve Earle, Billy Bragg, Tom Morello, Janeane Garofalo and others for several dates on the Tell Us the Truth Tour, sponsored by the AFL-CIO and Common Cause. The tour aimed to raise awareness of issues including media consolidation and political bias during the George W. Bush administration, and to get out the vote.

In 2004, she acted in the film Mind the Gap with six of her songs featured on the soundtrack.

In 2005, Sobule contributed music to Unfabulous, a popular Nickelodeon TV series about a 13-year-old aspiring songwriter, including a title song performed by Sobule under the program's opening credits. Four Sobule compositions or co-compositions appear on the soundtrack album, performed by series star Emma Roberts, Unfabulous and More: a cover version of "Mexican Wrestler" from Sobule's album Pink Pearl; "Punch Rocker" and "94 Weeks (Metal Mouth Freak)," both written by Sobule for Roberts' character to "compose" on the program; and "New Shoes," a track co-written with Unfabulous series creator Sue Rose.

In 2006, Sobule met actress, writer and comedian Julia Sweeney by chance at a conference in Monterey, California, which led to them performing together as "The Jill and Julia Show", an autobiographical mix of music, stories and commentary. They would perform at the James Randi Educational Foundation meeting in Las Vegas on January 19, 2007, as well as at regular shows at the Groundlings Theater in Los Angeles. Also in 2006, Sobule created a theme song for blogger Arianna Huffington's self-help book On Becoming Fearless.

In 2007, Sobule teamed up with John Doe to produce and record a cover of Neil Young's "Down by the River" for the American Laundromat Records benefit CD Cinnamon Girl – Women Artists Cover Neil Young For Charity. Other contributing artists included Josie Cotton, Tanya Donelly, Kristin Hersh, Lori McKenna, Britta Phillips, and The Watson Twins.

Also in 2007, Sobule's song "San Francisco" became the first single released by Don Was as part of his Wasmopolitan Cavalcade of Recorded Music, an advertiser-sponsored means for the recording and distribution of new music, part of the multimedia website mydamnchannel.com. The pair also collaborated on a 16-minute concert video, directed by Margaret Cho and entitled "Jill Sobule's Dance Party," distributed for free in two parts on both mydamnchannel.com and YouTube. Sobule also collaborated with Cho on the 2010 song and video "The Bear Song."

In May 2008, Sobule released a CD of music from Prozak and the Platypus, a multi-media collaboration of Sobule, playwright Elise Thoron, and graphic artist KellyAnne Hanrahan. The play, written by Thoron (book, lyrics) and Sobule (music) and illustrated in a graphic novella by Hanrahan, tells the story of a fierce young woman, Sara (a musician), and her father Arvin, a neuroscientist, who relocates his family from Los Angeles to Brisbane, Australia, to study R.E.M. sleep in the platypus, a unique species native to Australia. Shattered by her mother's recent suicide and unhappy with the side effects of her own treatment for depression, Sara renames herself "Prozak," rages through her songwriting, and rebels. Meanwhile, in her father's lab, Sara finds an unexpected confidant in her father's current lab subject, a jaunty platypus who speaks to her and calls himself "Frankie". In the piece, according to its website, "Music club and science lab become testing grounds in which angry teen and scientist father pit aboriginal mythology against modern neuroscience research. The dreams of a platypus prove to be the link between the two."

After performing together at a 2008 TED conference, Sobule and Sweeney revived "The Jill and Julia Show", bringing it on the road in 2009 and 2010, performing in New York and Denver, among other locations. The show featured an original theme song they'd co-written. In 2013, a condensed half-hour version of their show, recorded in Grand Marais, Minnesota, was featured on the public radio program Mountain Stage, syndicated nationally by National Public Radio. (In all, Sobule appeared on Mountain Stage 11 times from 1995 to 2024.)

Sobule and John Doe would team again in 2010 to make a collaborative album, which they recorded live in one day at The Pass studio in Los Angeles on April 11, 2010. A Day at the Pass was released one year later for Record Store Day, April 16, 2011.

In 2015, Sobule co-wrote four songs and sang back-up on a collection of new songs with lyrics by the writer David Hajdu: "The Angel in the Attic," "Bad Idea," "Nothing," and "The Girl in the Grocery Box." The album title, Waiting for the Angel, came from one of the songs co-written by Jill, who also sang on the track.

== Personal life and death ==
Sobule identified as bisexual.

Sobule died in a house fire in Woodbury, Minnesota, on the morning of May 1, 2025, at the age of 66.

== Awards and nominations ==
Award	Year	Nominee(s)	Category	Result	Ref.
MTV Video Music Awards	1995	"I Kissed a Girl"	Best Art Direction in a Video	Nominated	
MTV Video Music Awards	1995	"I Kissed a Girl"	Best Editing in a Video	Nominated	

== Discography ==
=== Studio albums ===
- Things Here Are Different (1990)
- Jill Sobule (1995)
- Happy Town (1997) – AUS No. 83
- Pink Pearl (2000)
- The Folk Years 2003–2003 (2004)
- Underdog Victorious (2004)
- Jill Sobule Sings Prozak and the Platypus (2008)
- California Years (2009)
- A Day at The Pass (with John Doe) (2011)
- Dottie's Charms (2014)
- Nostalgia Kills (2018)
- F**k 7th Grade: Original Cast Recording (2025)

=== DVD ===
- Live in Pittsburgh (2003)

=== Compilations ===
- I Never Learned to Swim: Jill Sobule 1990–2000 (2001)

=== EPs ===
- Jill's Holiday Songs 2000 (2000)
- It's the Thought That Counts (2001) – re-issued in 2005
- Be Mine... Please (2001)
- It's the Thought That Counts (2005)
- The Pinko Record Junior Executive EP (2012)

=== Singles ===
List of singles, with selected chart positions
Title	Year	Peak chart positions				Album
Title	Year	US	US Radio	US Adult	AUS	Album
"Too Cool to Fall in Love"	1990	—	—	17	—	Things Here Are Different
"Living Color"	1990	—	—	—	—	Things Here Are Different
"I Kissed a Girl"	1995	67	74	—	36	Jill Sobule
"Supermodel"	1995	—	—	—	53	Jill Sobule
"Good Person Inside"	1996	—	—	—	—	Jill Sobule
"Bitter"	1997	—	—	—	74	Happy Town
"When My Ship Comes In"	1997	—	—	—	—	Happy Town
"One of These Days"	2000	—	—	—	—	Pink Pearl
"Rainy Day Parade"	2000	—	—	—	—	Pink Pearl
"Stoned Soul Picnic"	2001	—	—	—	—	I Never Learned to Swim: Jill Sobule 1990–2000
"Cinnamon Park"	2004	—	—	—	—	Underdog Victorious
"San Francisco"	2007	—	—	—	—	California Years
"Island of Lost Things"	2018	—	—	—	—	Nostalgia Kills

=== Soundtrack appearances ===
- 1987: "There is More to Love" from Mind Killer
- 1995: "Supermodel" from Clueless
- 1996: "Where Do I Begin" from The Truth About Cats & Dogs
- 1996: "Truth Is You Lied" from Grace of My Heart
- 1996: "The Secretive Life" from Harriet the Spy
- 1999: "Rainy Day Parade" from Mystery Men
- 2003: "Tel Aviv," "Nothing Natural," "Bitter," "Somewhere in New Mexico," "Freshman," and "Vrbana Bridge" from Mind the Gap
- 2005: "Love Is Never Equal" from Jenny McCarthy's Dirty Love

=== Various artist compilations ===
- 1992: "Too Cool to Fall in Love" on An Elpee's Worth of Productions
- 1995: "The Jig Is Up" on Grooves Volume 8
- 1995: "Good Person Inside" and "The Man in the Boat" on Spew
- 1995: "Merry Christmas from the Family" on You Sleigh Me
- 1997: "Stoned Soul Picnic" on Time and Love: The Music of Laura Nyro
- 1997: "I Will Survive" on In Their Own Words and Hard Rock Live
- 1998: "The Saddest Day of the Year" on A Christmas to Remember
- 1999: "Just a Little Lovin'" on Forever Dusty
- 1999: "Sunrise, Sunset" on Knitting on the Roof
- 2000: "Rainy Day Parade" on New Talent Spotlight Volume 2
- 2000: "I Kissed a Girl" on K-TEL Pop Alternative
- 2004: "Texas" and "War Correspondent" on Tell Us The Truth (The Live Concert Recording); also backing vocals
- 2004: "Don't Let Us Get Sick" on Enjoy Every Sandwich: The Songs of Warren Zevon
- 2006: "For the Good Times" (with Lloyd Cole) on The Pilgrim − A Celebration of Kris Kristofferson
- 2007: "Down by the River" (with John Doe) on Cinnamon Girl – Women Artists Cover Neil Young For Charity
- 2015: "The Angel in the Attic," "Bad Idea," "Nothing," and "The Girl in the Grocery Box" on Waiting for the Angel: Songs with Words by David Hajdu
- 2016: "America Back" on Monster Protest Jamz (Volume One) (also album producer)

=== B-sides ===
- 1995: "Queen of Spades" (from the "Supermodel" single)
- 1997: "Loveless Motel" (from the "Bitter" single, later included on the album Pink Pearl)
- 2000: "Lucy at the Gym" (from the "When My Ship Comes In" single, later included on the album Pink Pearl)
- 2004: "Almost Fell" (bonus track on the Borders edition of Underdog Victorious)

=== Other ===
- Clouds Over Eden (1994) – Richard Barone album (cowriter, vocals, electric guitar, "Waiting For The Train")
- "So Jill" (1997) – Tribute song to Sobule, written and performed by Jane Wiedlin, Lloyd Cole and Charlotte Caffey
- The Negatives (2000) – Lloyd Cole and The Negatives album (guitars, vocals)
- "Another Thing Goin'" (2000) on The Brian Woodbury Songbook (performer; "as sung by")
- Unfabulous and More (2005) – Emma Roberts TV soundtrack album (songwriter; acoustic guitar, background vocals)
- Glow (2010) − Richard Barone album (backing vocals, "Odd Girl Out")
- "Sweet Penny and the Lion" (2018) - Jill Sobule and the Middle Witches (composer, guitar, lead vocals)
- "Lumberjill" (2019) – Written and performed for The Simpsons episode "Marge the Lumberjill"
