= List of animated television series of 1996 =

This is a list of animated television series first aired in 1996.

Animated television series first aired in 1996
Title	Seasons	Episodes	Country	Year	Original channel	Technique
Action League Now!	1	51	United States	1996–2002	Nickelodeon	Stop-Motion; Live-action
Adventures from the Book of Virtues	3	39	United States	1996–2000	PBS	Traditional
Albert Says... Nature Knows Best	2	13	Germany	1996–97	ZDF	Traditional
All Dogs Go to Heaven: The Series	3	40	United States	1996–98	Syndication (1996–98); Fox Family Channel (1998)	Traditional
Amazing Animals	4	52	United Kingdom	1996–99	Disney Channel	CGI; Live action
The Ambiguously Gay Duo	1	12	United States	1996–2011	ABC (1996); NBC (1996–2011)	Traditional
Arthur	25	253	United States; Canada	1996–2022	PBS Kids	Traditional (seasons 1–15); Flash (season 16–19); Toon Boom Harmony (seasons 20–25)
Badaboum et Garatoi	1	8	France	1996	La Cinquième	Traditional
Beast Wars: Transformers	3	52	Canada; United States; Japan	1996–99	Syndication; YTV; TXN	CGI
Billy the Cat	2	52	France; Belgium; Canada; Germany	1996–2001	France 3 RTL-TVI; ZDF; Family Channel; S4C	Traditional
Blazing Dragons	2	26	United Kingdom; Canada; France	1996–98	Teletoon; France 3 Canal+ M6; ITV	Traditional
The Blobs	1	26	United Kingdom	1996	ITV	Traditional; Live action (intro only)
Blue's Clues	6	143	United States	1996–2006	Nickelodeon	Flash; Live action
Les Bons Conseils de Célestin	7	360	France	1996–2008	France 3, France 5, Gulli	Traditional
Bruno the Kid	1	36	United States; United Kingdom	1996–97	Syndication; Nickelodeon	Traditional
Bureau of Alien Detectors	1	13	United States	1996	UPN	Traditional
C Bear and Jamal	2	13	United States; Germany	1996–97	Fox Kids	Traditional
Captain Simian & the Space Monkeys	1	26	United States	1996–97	Syndication	Traditional
Carland Cross	1	26	Belgium; Canada; France	1996–97	BRTN; RTBF; Canal+ Télétoon; TF1; Super Écran and TVA	Traditional
Cave Kids	1	8	United States	1996	Syndication	Traditional
Crocadoo	2	52	Australia	1996–98	Nine Network	Traditional
Dennis and Gnasher	2	26	United Kingdom	1996–98	BBC One; TCC (season 1); Fox Kids (season 2)	Traditional
Dexter's Laboratory	4	78	United States	1996–2003	Cartoon Network	Traditional
Dog Tracer	1	26	France	1996	TF1	Traditional
Dragon Flyz	1	26	France; United States	1996–97	France 3 Syndication	Traditional
Duchi and Puku	1	26	South Korea	1996	KBS2	Traditional
Eagle Riders	1	65	United States; Japan	1996–97	Syndication (1996); Network Ten (1997)	Traditional
The Enchanted World of Brambly Hedge	1	8	United Kingdom	1996–2000	BBC One	Stop-Motion
The Fantastic Voyages of Sinbad the Sailor	1	26	United States	1996–98	Cartoon Network	Traditional
Flash Gordon	1	26	United States; France; Canada	1996–97	Syndication; Channel 4 and TCC; YTV; France 3 Canal+ Canal J	Traditional
Hey Arnold!	5	100	United States	1996–2004	Nickelodeon	Traditional
The Incredible Hulk	2	21	United States	1996–97	UPN	Traditional
Inspector Gadget's Field Trip	2	22	United States	1996–98	The History Channel	Traditional
Jumanji	3	40	United States	1996–99	UPN (1996–98); Syndication (1998–99)	Traditional
Jungle Cubs	2	21	United States	1996–98	ABC	Traditional
Jungle Show	1	26	France	1996	Canal+	Traditional
KaBlam!	4	48	United States	1996–2000	Nickelodeon	Traditional; Stop-Motion; Live action CGI
Kangoo	1	65	France	1996–99	TF1	Traditional
Little Mouse on the Prairie	1	26	United States; China	1996	CCTV	Traditional
The Magical Adventures of Quasimodo	1	26	Canada; France	1996	Family Channel; France 3	Traditional
Mi Familia es un Dibujo	3		Argentina	1996–98	Telefe	Traditional/Live action
Mighty Ducks: The Animated Series	1	26	United States	1996–97	ABC; Syndication	Traditional
Migraine Boy	1	12	United States	1996	MTV	Traditional
The Morph Files	1	13	United Kingdom	1996	CBBC	Stop-Motion
Mortal Kombat: Defenders of the Realm	1	13	United States	1996	USA Network	Traditional
The Mouse and the Monster	1	13	United States	1996–97	UPN	Traditional
Night Hood	1	26	Canada; France	1996–97	TF1; Canal+ YTV	Traditional
Nilus the Sandman	2	26	Canada	1996–98	Family Channel	Traditional; Live action
The Off-Beats	2	14	United States	1996–98	Nickelodeon	Traditional
Once Upon a Time... The Explorers	1	26	France	1996	France 3 Canal+	Traditional
Oups et Houpla	1	52	France	1996	France 3, Canal J	Flash
The Oz Kids	1	9	United States	1996–97	Direct-to-video	Traditional
Pelezinho	1	52	Spain	1996	Antena 3	Traditional
Pond Life	2	20	United Kingdom	1996–2000	Channel 4	Traditional
Princesse Shéhérazade	2	52	France	1996	France 2 France 3	Traditional
Project G.e.e.K.e.R.	1	13	United States	1996	CBS	Traditional
Quack Pack	1	39	United States	1996	Syndication	Traditional
Rasmus Klump	1	52	Denmark, Germany	1996–2000	DR; ARD	Traditional
Rattatui	1	13	Germany	1996	ZDF	Traditional
The Real Adventures of Jonny Quest	2	52	United States	1996–97	Cartoon Network	Traditional
Richie Rich	1	13	United States	1996	Syndication	Traditional
Road Rovers	1	13	United States	1996–97	Kids' WB	Traditional
Robin	2	30	Canada; Germany; Sweden	1996	SVT1	Traditional
Romuald the Reindeer	1	13	United Kingdom; France	1996	BBC1; TCC; CBBC	Traditional
Saban's Adventures of Oliver Twist	1	52	United States; France	1996–97	Fox Kids; Syndication; TF1	Traditional
Siegfried & Roy: Masters of the Impossible	1	4	United States	1996	Fox Kids	Traditional
Sky Dancers	1	26	France; United States	1996	France 2 Syndication	Traditional
Sniz & Fondue	3	23	United States	1996–97	Nickelodeon	Traditional
The Spooktacular New Adventures of Casper	4	52	United States	1996–98	Fox Kids	Traditional
Stickin' Around	3	39	Canada	1996–98	YTV	Traditional (seasons 1 and 3); Flash (season 2)
Superman: The Animated Series	4	54	United States	1996–2000	Kids' WB	Traditional
The Silver Brumby	3	39	Australia	1996–98	Network Ten	Traditional
Testament: The Bible in Animation	1	9	United Kingdom	1996	BBC2; S4C	Traditional; Stop-Motion; Paint-on-glass
The Tex Avery Show		99	United States	1996–2002	Cartoon Network	Traditional
Toy Story Treats	1	54	United States	1996	ABC	CGI
The Treacle People	2	27	United Kingdom	1996–97	ITV	Stop-Motion
Urmel	1	26	Germany	1996–97	Das Erste	Traditional
Usop Sontorian	3	50	Malaysia	1996–97	RTM	Traditional
Vor-Tech: Undercover Conversion Squad	1	13	United States; Canada; France	1996	Syndication	Traditional
Waynehead	1	13	United States; Canada	1996–97	Kids' WB; YTV	Traditional
The Why Why Family	1	26	France; United States	1996	Fox Kids; France 3	Traditional
Wing Commander Academy	1	13	United States	1996	USA Network	Traditional
Winnetou	1	10	Myanmar	1996	SWR Fernsehen	Traditional

Anime television series first aired in 1996

Title	Seasons	Episodes	Country	Year	Original channel	Technique
After War Gundam X	1	39	Japan	1996	ANN	Traditional
B't X	1	25	Japan	1996	JNN	Traditional
Baby & Me	1	35	Japan	1996–97	TXN	Traditional
Bakusō Kyōdai Let's & Go!!	1	51	Japan	1996		Traditional
Boys Over Flowers	1	51	Japan	1996–97		Traditional
Brave Command Dagwon	1	48	Japan	1996–97		Traditional
Case Closed	28	1083+	Japan	1996–present		Traditional
Cinderella	1	26	Japan	1996		Traditional
Dragon Ball GT		64	Japan	1996–97		Traditional
Famous Dog Lassie	1	26	Japan	1996		Traditional
First Human Gon	1	39	Japan	1996–97		Traditional
Gambalist! Shun	1	30	Japan	1996–97		Traditional
Jigoku Sensei Nūbē	1	49	Japan	1996–97		Traditional
Kiko-chan's Smile	1	51	Japan	1996–97		Traditional
KochiKame: Tokyo Beat Cops		373	Japan	1996–2004		Traditional
Kodocha	1	102	Japan	1996–98		Traditional
The Legend of Zorro	1	52	Japan	1996–97		Traditional
Magical Project S	1	26	Japan	1996–97		Traditional
Martian Successor Nadesico	1	26	Japan	1996–97		Traditional
Midori no Makibaō	1	61	Japan	1996–97		Traditional
Mizuiro Jidai	1	47	Japan	1996–97		Traditional
Raideen the Superior	1	38	Japan	1996–97		Traditional
Remi, Nobody's Girl	1	26	Japan	1996–97	Animax	Traditional
Rurouni Kenshin		95	Japan	1996–98		Traditional
Saber Marionette J	1	25	Japan	1996–97		Traditional
Sailor Moon Sailor Stars	1	34	Japan	1996–97		Traditional
Shōnen Santa no Daibōken	1	24	Japan	1996		Traditional
Slayers Next	1	26	Japan	1996		Traditional
Those Who Hunt Elves	1	12	Japan	1996		Traditional
Violinist of Hameln	1	25	Japan	1996–97		Traditional
The Vision of Escaflowne	1	26	Japan	1996		Traditional
VS Knight Ramune & 40 Fire	1	26	Japan	1996		Traditional
YAT Anshin! Uchū Ryokō	1	50	Japan	1996–97		Traditional
You're Under Arrest	1	47	Japan	1996–97		Traditional

== See also ==
- List of animated feature films of 1996
- List of Japanese animation television series of 1996
