= List of animated feature films of 1996 =

This is a list of animated feature films first released in 1996.

== List ==
Title	Country	Director	Production company	Animation technique	Format	Notes	Release date	Duration
The 3 Little Pigs: The Movie	Canada	Jules Alain de Test; Eric Bayle; Karl Anders Holman (English version)	PolyGram Video (distributor); Master Films; Odec Kid Cartoons; Innovision Communications PVT, Ltd.	Traditional	Direct-to-video		?	70 minutes
Advancer Tina	Japan	Kan Fukumoto	Beam Entertainment; Dandelion Animation Studio; Green Bunny; Shindeban Film	Traditional	Direct-to-video; OVA		August 21, 1996	45 minutes
The Adventures of Toad	United Kingdom	Martin Gates	Martin Gates Productions; BMG Entertainment; Channel 4 (distributor)	Traditional	Television film		December 24, 1996	52 minutes
Against the Eagle and the Lion; Contra el águila y el león	Cuba; Spain	Juan Padrón	Instituto Cubano del Arte e Industria Cinematográficos	Traditional	Theatrical		?	78 minutes
Aladdin and the King of Thieves	United States	Tad Stones	Walt Disney Television Animation	Traditional	Direct-to-video	Third and final installment in the Aladdin film series; also serves as the series finale to the television series based on the 1992 film.	August 13, 1996	81 minutes
Alì Babà	Italy	Zlata Potancokova Belli	Airone Cinematografica	Traditional	Theatrical		July 26, 1996	78 minutes
All Dogs Go to Heaven 2	United States	Paul Sabella; Larry Leker	MGM/UA Family Entertainment; Metro-Goldwyn-Mayer Animation	Traditional	Theatrical	Sequel to All Dogs Go to Heaven (1989).	March 29, 1996	84 minutes
Angel ga Tonda Hi エンジェルがとんだ日 (Enjeru ga tonda hi)	Japan	Hisako Yamada	Gendai Productions	Traditional	Theatrical		July 27, 1996	80 minutes
Apo Apo World: Giant Baba 90-bun 1-hon Shoubu; APO APOワールド ジャイアント馬場90分一本勝負 (Apo Apo Wārudo Jaianto Baba 90-bu Ipponshōbu)	Japan	Tetsuo Yasumi	Shochiku (distributor); Sedic International	Traditional	Theatrical	Fictionalised tribute to Giant Baba (January 23, 1938 – January 31, 1999), a Japanese professional wrestler.	June 15, 1996	90 minutes
Armitage III: Poly-Matrix アミテージ POLY-MATRIXポリマトリックス (Amitēji Pori Matorikkusu)	Japan	Hiroyuki Ochi	AIC	Traditional	Direct-to-video; Compilation film	Compilation film of the four-part OVA series that ran from February 25, 1995 to November 25, 1995.	April 20, 1996	92 minutes
The Ballad of the Viking King, Holger the Dane; Balladen om Holger Danske	Denmark	Laila Hodell	Frejas Børn	Stop motion	Theatrical		August 30, 1996	82 minutes
Beauty and the Beast	Australia	Richard Slapczynski (animation director)	Burbank Animation Studios	Traditional	Television film		?	50 minutes
Beavis and Butt-Head Do America	United States	Mike Judge	MTV Productions; Geffen Pictures; Rough Draft Studios; Judgemental Films	Traditional	Theatrical		December 20, 1996	81 minutes
Black Jack: The Movie ブラック・ジャック (Burakku Jakku)	Japan	Osamu Dezaki	Shochiku (distributor); Tezuka Productions	Traditional	Theatrical	Extension of the OVA series based on the manga of the same name by Osamu Tezuka that ran from December 21, 1993 to December 16, 2011 for twelve 47–53 minute episodes.	November 30, 1996	105 minutes
Cassiopéia	Brazil	Clóvis Veira	NDR Filmes	Computer	Theatrical	First computer animated feature film made outside of the United States.	April 1, 1996	80 minutes
Chocchan Monogatari チョッちゃん物語 (Chotchan monogatari)	Japan	Hiroko Tokita	T&K Telefilm (distributor); Triangle Staff	Traditional	Theatrical	Fictionalisation based on the life of Chō Kuroyanagi (1910–2006), a Japanese essayist and mother of Tetsuko Kuroyanagi.	March 20, 1996	76 minutes
Christmas in Cartoontown	United States	Lon Moore	UAV Entertainment; Schwartz & Company; Suzhou Hong Ying Animation	Traditional	Direct-to-video		December 15, 1996	60 minutes
Cinderella	Australia	Richard Slapczynski	Burbank Animation Studios	Traditional	Direct-to-video		March 4, 1996	51 minutes
City Hunter: The Secret Service シティーハンタースペシャル ザ・シークレット・サービス (Shitī Hantā Supesharu Za Shīkuretto Sābisu)	Japan	Kenji Kodama	Sunrise	Traditional	Television special		January 5, 1996	90 minutes
Crayon Shin-chan: Adventure in Henderland クレヨンしんちゃん ヘンダーランドの大冒険 (Kureyon Shin-chan: Hendārando no Dai Bōken)	Japan	Mitsuru Hongo	Shin-Ei Animation	Traditional	Theatrical		April 19, 1996	97 minutes
Doraemon: Nobita and the Galaxy Super-express ドラえもん: のび太と銀河超特急(エクスプレス) (Doraemon: Nobita to Ginga Ekusupuresu)	Japan	Tsutomu Shibayama	Asatsu; Shin-Ei Animation; Toho	Traditional	Theatrical		March 2, 1996	97 minutes
Dragon Ball: The Path to Power ドラゴンボール 最強への道 (Doragon Bōru: Saikyō e no Michi)	Japan	Shigeyasu Yamauchi	Toei Animation	Traditional	Theatrical		March 2, 1996	80 minutes
Dragon Quest Saga: Emblem of Roto ドラゴンクエスト列伝 ロトの紋章 (Dragon Quest Retsuden: Roto no Monshō)	Japan	Tsukasa Sunaga	Nippon Animation; Enix; Pony Canyon; Shochiku (distributor)	Traditional	Theatrical		April 20, 1996	45 minutes
Empress Esther 왕후 에스더 (Wanghu Eseudeo)	South Korea	Kim Cheong-gi		Traditional	Theatrical		July 20, 1996	68 minutes
The File of Young Kindaichi 金田一少年の事件簿 (Kindaichi Shōnen no Jikenbo)	Japan	Daisuke Nishio	Toei Animation	Traditional	Theatrical		December 14, 1996	94 minutes
The Five Suns: A Sacred History of Mexico	United States	Patricia Amlin	?	Traditional	Television film		?	54 minutes
Gulliver's Travels	United States	Diane Eskenazi	Golden Films; Sony Wonder (distributor)	Traditional	Direct-to-video		March 19, 1996	48 minutes
Hansel and Gretel	Australia	Richard Slapczynski (animation director)	Burbank Animation Studios	Traditional	Television film		?	50 minutes
The Hard: Bounty Hunter ザ・ハード BOUNTY HUNTER (Za Hādo Baunti Hantā)	Japan	Shunji Ōga	J.C.Staff	Traditional	Direct-to-video; OVA		May 1, 1996	47 minutes
Heisei Harenchi Gakuen 平成ハレンチ学園 ("Heisei Shameless School")	Japan	Toshō Noma	Pink Pineapple; Wise Guy	Traditional	Direct-to-video; OVA		March 1, 1996	47 minutes
How the Toys Saved Christmas; La Freccia Azzurra (The Blue Arrow)	Italy	Enzo D'Alò	Alpha-Film; Lanterna Magica; Monipoly Productions	Traditional	Theatrical		December 5, 1996	83 minutes
The Hunchback of Notre Dame	United States	Gary Trousdale; Kirk Wise	Walt Disney Feature Animation	Traditional	Theatrical		June 21, 1996	91 minutes
The Hunchback of Notre Dame	United States	Diane Eskenazi	Golden Films; Sony Wonder (distributor)	Traditional	Direct-to-video		April 16, 1996	45 minutes
The Hunchback of Notre Dame	United States; Japan	Toshiyuki Hiruma; Takashi Masunaga	Cayre Brothers; Goodtimes Entertainment; Jetlag Productions	Traditional	Direct-to-video	Seventeenth and final installment of the "Children's Classics" series produced by Jetlag Productions, as well as the final production and release overall from the studio.	April 30, 1996	49 minutes
The Hunchback of Notre Dame	Australia	Richard Slapczynski (animation director)	Burbank Animation Studios	Traditional	Television film		April 10, 1996	50 minutes
The Hunchback of Notre Dame; Der Glöckner von Notre Dame	German	Roswitha Haas	Dingo Pictures	Limited	Direct-to-video		July 22, 1996	65 minutes
Itsuka no Main: Kaminari Shōnen Tenta Sanjō! いつかのメイン 雷少年・天太参上! (Somebody's Main: Thunder Boy – Tenta Visits!)	Japan	Hiromichi Matano	J.C.Staff; Toei Video (distributor)	Traditional	Direct-to-video; OVA		February 21, 1996	45 minutes
Hugo: The Movie Star a. k. a. Hugo 2: The Movie Star; Jungledyret 2 – den store filmhelt	Denmark; Sweden; Norway; Finland	Stefan Fjeldmark; Jørgen Lerdam; Flemming Quist Møller	A. Film A/S	Traditional	Theatrical	Sequel to Jungledyret Hugo (1993).	December 20, 1996	72 minutes
James and the Giant Peach	United States; United Kingdom	Henry Selick	Allied Filmmakers; Skellington Productions	Stop motion/Live action	Theatrical; Live-action animated film		April 12, 1996	79 minutes
Jigoku Sensei Nūbē 地獄先生ぬ〜べ〜 (Hell Teacher Nūbē)	Japan	Junji Shimizu	Toei Animation	Traditional	Theatrical		July 6, 1996	48 minutes
Kenji's Trunk 賢治のトランク (Kenji no Trunk)	Japan	Hiroshi Fukutomi; Ryūtarō Nakamura	Animaruya; Triangle Staff	Traditional	Theatrical; Anthology film	Anthology adapted from three short stories by Kenji Miyazawa, "The Cat's Office" (1926), "The Twin Stars" (1934) and "The Coat of a Glacier Mouse" (1923).	August 24, 1996	72 minutes
Kimera キメラ (lit. "Chimera")	Japan	Kazu Yokota	Artland	Traditional	Direct-to-video; OVA		July 31, 1996	48 minutes
Kings and Cabbage; Короли и капуста (Koroli i kapusta)	Russia	Mariya Muat	Anima-Film	Stop motion	?	The film used a mixture of stop motion puppets and cutout elements.	?	52 minutes
The Land Before Time IV: Journey Through the Mists	United States	Roy Allen Smith	Universal Cartoon Studios	Traditional	Direct-to-video	Fourth installment in The Land Before Time film series.	December 10, 1996	74 minutes
Little Dinosaur Dooly 아기공룡 둘리 – 얼음별 대모험 (Agigongnyong dulli – eoreumbyeol daemoheom)	South Korea	Kim Su-jeong; Lim Kyung-won	Doolinara; Seoul Movie	Traditional	Theatrical		July 24, 1996	80 minutes
Lupin III: Dead or Alive ルパン三世 DEAD OR ALIVE (Rupan Sansei: Deddo oa Araibu)	Japan	Monkey Punch	TMS Entertainment	Traditional	Theatrical		April 20, 1996	97 minutes
Lupin III: The Secret of Twilight Gemini ルパン三世『トワイライト☆ジェミニの秘密』 (Rupan Sansei: Twilight Gemini no Himitsu)	Japan	Gisaburō Sugii	Tokyo Movie Shinsha; Nippon TV (distributor)	Traditional	Television special		August 2, 1996	90 minutes, 92 minutes
Maya's Life マヤの一生 (Maya no Isshou)	Japan	Seijirô Kôyama	Mushi Production	Traditional	Theatrical		August 20, 1996	70 minutes
M.D. Geist II: Death Force; M.D.ガイスト2 DEATH FORCE (M. D. Gaisuto 2 Desu Force)	Japan	Koichi Ohata	Zero-G Room	Traditional	Direct-to-video; OVA	Sequel to M.D. Geist (1986).	March 1, 1996	45 minutes
Miki Mol and the Terrible Cloak; Miki Mol i Straszne Płaszczydło	Poland	Ryszard Antoniszczak; Krzysztof Kiwerski	Studio Filmów Animowanych (Kraków); Telewizja Polska	Traditional	Direct-to-video		June 1, 1996	83 minutes
The Nintama Rantarō Movie 映画 忍たま乱太郎 (Eiga Nintama Rantarō)	Japan	Tsuneo Kobayashi; Tsutomu Shibayama (chief director)	Ajia-do Animation Works; Eiga "Nintama Rantarō" Production Committee; Shochiku (distributor)	Traditional	Theatrical	Based on the manga Rakudai Ninja Rantarō, written and illustrated by Sōbe Amako, and the animated television series Nintama Rantarō, currently running since April 10, 1993.	June 29, 1996	47 minutes
The Nome Prince and the Magic Belt	United States	Tom Decker	Hyperion Pictures	Traditional	Direct-to-video; Compilation film	First compilation film of the animated television series The Oz Kids (1996).	October 1, 1996	64 minutes
Odyssey Into the Mind's Eye	United States	Jan Nickman	Odyssey Productions	Computer	Direct-to-video		July 26, 1996	66 minutes
Pepolino and the Treasure of the Mermaid; Pepolino und der Schatz der Meerjungfrau	Germany; Hungary; Canada	János Uzsák	Infafilm Gmbh; Videovox Stúdió; Focusfilm Kft	Traditional	Theatrical		August 29, 1996	84 minutes
Pipi: Unforgettable Fireflies; PiPi とべないホタル (Pipi Tobenai Hotaru)	Japan	Shinichi Nakada	Mushi Production	Traditional	Theatrical		March 23, 1996	90 minutes
The Princess Castle	United States	Diane Eskenazi	Golden Films; Sony Wonder (distributor)	Traditional	Direct-to-video		June 23, 1996	48 minutes
Sanctuary サンクチュアリ (Sankuchuari)	Japan	Takashi Watanabe	OB Planning; PASTEL; Shogakukan-Shueisha Productions; Toho; VAP; Tokyo Kids	Traditional	Direct-to-video; OVA		May 1, 1996	50 minutes
Santa Claus and the Magic Drum; Jultomten och trolltrumman A Mikulás és a varázsdob	Finland; Hungary	Mauri Kunnas; Tamás Baksa; Tibor Hernádi	Yleisradio; Interpannonia Film Ltd	Traditional	Television film		December 24, 1996	51 minutes
The Secret of the Hunchback	United States	Mike Jones; Ken C. Johnson	The Stillwater Production Company; Schwartz & Company (uncredited); UAV Corporation; Suzhou Hong Ying Animation	Traditional	Direct-to-video	First film in the UAV The Secret of... series.	February 28, 1996	50 minutes
Shinran Shōnin to Ōsha-jō no Higeki 親鸞聖人と王舎城の悲劇 (The Tragedy of Shinran Shounin and the Royal Castle)	Japan	Hideaki Oba; Tomoyuki Matsumoto (animation)	AIC	Traditional	Direct-to-video; OVA	Side story spin-off of the OVA series Sekai no Hikari: Shinran Shōnin (The Light of the World: Shinran Shounin) that ran for six 32 minute episodes from June 1992 until at least March 5, 1999.	September 6, 1996	95 minutes
Slayers Return スレイヤーズ RETURN (Sureiyāzu ritān)	Japan	Kunihiko Yuyama; Hiroshi Watanabe	J.C.Staff	Traditional	Theatrical	Second installment in the Slayers film series.	August 3, 1996	61 minutes
The Snow Queen's Revenge	United Kingdom	Martin Gates	Martin Gates Productions; Carrington Productions	Traditional	Television film	Sequel to The Snow Queen (1995).	?	65 minutes
Soreike! Anpanman Soratobu Ehon to Garasu no Kutsu それいけ! アンパンマン 空とぶ絵本とガラスの靴 (Let's Go! Anpanman: The Flying Picture Book and the Glass Shoes)	Japan	Akinori Nagaoka	Tokyo Movie Shinsha	Traditional	Theatrical		July 13, 1996	60 minutes
Space Armageddon 아마게돈 (Amagaedon)	South Korea	Lee Hyun-se	Armageddon Production Committee; Armageddon Co., Ltd. Mirinae Software; Voice Enterprise; Shinbo Startup Investment Co., Ltd. Alex Computer Co., Ltd. LG Electronics Co., Ltd. Team Mania/Mr.Blue Hangul and Computer Co., Ltd. Yasulloc Pro	Traditional	Theatrical		January 20, 1996	87 minutes
Space Jam	United States	Joe Pytka	Warner Bros. Family Entertainment; Warner Bros. Feature Animation	Traditional/Live action	Theatrical; Live-action animated film		November 10, 1996 (Los Angeles); November 15, 1996 (United States)	88 minutes
Spring and Chaos イーハトーブ幻想 Kenjiの春 (Īhatōbu Gensō Kenji no Haru)	Japan	Shōji Kawamori	Group TAC; NNS (distributor)	Traditional	Television special		December 14, 1996	56 minutes
The Story of Santa Claus	United States	Toby Bluth	Arnold Shapiro Productions; Film Roman	Traditional	Television special		December 7, 1996	47 minutes
Tenchi the Movie: Tenchi Muyo in Love 天地無用 IN LOVE! (Tenchi Muyō in Rabu!)	Japan	Hiroshi Negishi	Anime International Company; Pioneer LDC; Toei Company	Traditional	Theatrical	First installment in the Tenchi Muyo! film series.	April 20, 1996	95 minutes
Tom Thumb Meets Thumbelina	United States	Diane Eskenazi	Golden Films; Philippine Animation Studio Inc. Sony Wonder (distributor)	Traditional	Direct-to-video		September 17, 1996	48 minutes
Toto, Lost in New York	United States	Stephen Anderson; Tom Decker; Rhoydon Shishido	Hyperion Pictures	Traditional	Direct-to-video; Compilation film	Second compilation film of the animated television series The Oz Kids (1996).	October 1, 1996	85 minutes
The Triumph of Time; Ο θρίαμβος του χρόνου (O thriamvos tou hronou)	Greece	Vassilis Mazomenos	Horme pictures	Traditional	Experimental film		November 1996	72 minutes
Ultraman: Super Fighter Legend – Comet Warrior God Tsuifon Appears ウルトラマン超闘士激伝 彗星戦神ツイフォン登場 (Ultraman: Chō Tōshi Gekiden – Suisei Senjin Tsuifon Tōjō)	Japan	Tetsuro Amino; Akira Nishimori (Unit Director)	Bandai; Bandai Visual; Tsuburaya Productions	Traditional	Direct-to-video; OVA		September 25, 1996	41 minutes
Virtual Oz	United States	Keith Ingham	Hyperion Pictures	Traditional	Direct-to-video; Compilation film	Third compilation film of the animated television series The Oz Kids (1996).	October 1, 1996	66 minutes
Werner: Eat My Dust!!! Werner – Das muß kesseln!!!	Germany	Udo Beissel; Michael Schaack	Neue Constantin Film; Hahn Film AG; Royal Film Produktion; TFC Trickompany Film Produktion	Traditional	Theatrical		June 27, 1996	85 minutes
Who Stole Santa?	United States	Bert Ring; Rhoydon Shishido; David Teague	Hyperion Pictures	Traditional	Direct-to-video; Compilation film	Fifth compilation film of the animated television series The Oz Kids (1996).	October 1, 1996	62 minutes
X エックス (Ekkusu)	Japan	Rintaro	Madhouse	Traditional	Theatrical		August 3, 1996	100 minutes
Yawara! Special – I've Always Been About You... YAWARA! Special ずっと君のことが…。 (Yawara! Supesharu – Zutto Kimi no Koto ga)	Japan	Morio Asaka	Madhouse; Nippon TV (distributor)	Traditional	Television special		July 19, 1996	110 minutes

== Highest-grossing animated films of the year ==
Rank	Title	Studio	Worldwide gross	Ref.
1	The Hunchback of Notre Dame	Walt Disney Feature Animation	$325,338,851	
2	Beavis and Butt-Head Do America	MTV Productions / Geffen Pictures	$63,118,386	
3	James and the Giant Peach	Allied Filmmakers / Skellington Productions	$28,946,127	
4	Doraemon: Nobita and the Galaxy Super-express	Asatsu	$15,508,800	
5	All Dogs Go to Heaven 2	Metro-Goldwyn-Mayer Animation	$8,620,678	
6	Dragon Ball: The Path to Power	Toei Animation	$6,326,451	

== See also ==
- List of animated television series of 1996
