= List of Stickin' Around episodes =

This is a list of episodes for the Canadian animated television series Stickin' Around.

== Series overview ==
Season	Episodes	Originally released	
Season	Episodes	First released	Last released
1	13	August 14, 1996	December 9, 1996
2	13	January 20, 1997	December 8, 1997
3	13	January 19, 1998	April 13, 1998

== Episodes ==
=== Season 1 (1996) ===
Every episode this season was directed by John Halfpenny. Wang Film Productions provided the animation services for this season.

No. overall	No. in season	Title	Written by	Original release date
1	1	"Aaand Action!"	Dale Schott	August 14, 1996
1	1	"Night of the Living Dumpster"	Chris Kelly	August 14, 1996
"Aaand Action!": Stacy and Bradley decided to make a movie for Uncle Saggy's Really Really Bad Home Videos Show, which results in chaos when they, Polly, Lance and Russell get inexplicably lost downtown. "Night of the Living Dumpster": Taking out the garbage turns into a volcanic experience!
2	2	"Disappearing Act"	Kate Barris	August 21, 1996
2	2	"And the Wiener Is..."	Nicole Keefler	August 21, 1996
"Disappearing Act": Stella orders Stacy to clean her messy room, and when Stacy discovers her mom's vanishing cream can make more than wrinkles disappear, she uses it to make her room look clean and she and Bradley use it to become invisible. "And the Wiener Is...": The kids go on a journey to prevent Lance and Russell from stealing their winning lottery ticket.
3	3	"Beware the Lunchwad"	Dan Redican	August 28, 1996
3	3	"Madam Know-It-All"	Simon Muntner	August 28, 1996
"Beware the Lunchwad": Stacy and Bradley face the disgusting lunchroom. "Madam Know-It-All": Stacy claims she is a psychic, like her favorite TV star Madam Know-It-All.
4	4	"Return Your Seats to an Uptight Position"	John May	October 14, 1996
4	4	"Yams Away!"	Kate Barris	October 14, 1996
"Return Your Seats to an Uptight Position": Stacy pretends to be an airplane pilot. "Yams Away!": Stacy's Thanksgiving might not be the best she's hoping for it to be.
5	5	"The Good, the Bad, and the Bradley"	Dale Schott	October 21, 1996
5	5	"Bye Bye, Baby Birdie"	John May	October 21, 1996
"The Good, the Bad, and the Bradley": Bradley becomes the new hall monitor, but it goes way too much in his head. "Bye Bye, Baby Birdie": Stacy and Bradley play outside and go on a safari, and encounter a dead baby bird and give it a proper funeral.
6	6	"Didn't'cha, Mr. D?"	Brad Birch	October 28, 1996
6	6	"The Amazing Rubber Guy"	Dan Redican	October 28, 1996
"Didn't'cha, Mr. D?": Mr. D reminisces the simple days when he was a child, also taking Stacy, Polly and Bradley on an adventure during the process. "The Amazing Rubber Guy": Stacy and Bradley play a game of baseball against Lance, Russell and Bradley's Superhero personas.
7	7	"If It Ain't Fixed, Break It"	John May	November 11, 1996
7	7	"The Mucus Touch"	John May	November 11, 1996
"If It Ain't Fixed, Break It": Frank runs away from home, when Stella wants to take him to the vet to "get fixed". "The Mucus Touch": When Bradley's illness makes him miss a surprisingly fun day at school, Stacy cheers him up by telling fairy tales.
8	8	"Jumbo Frank"	Kate Barris	August 14, 1996
8	8	"Owed to a Tree"	Bob Ardiel	August 14, 1996
"Jumbo Frank": Frank goes on a rampage after Stella notices he gets stuck in his doggy door too often and forces him to go on a diet. "Owed to a Tree": Bradley and Stacy try to prevent their favorite tree from being chopped down by the cityworks department.
9	9	"Lassie Go Home"	Erika O'Reilly	November 18, 1996
9	9	"Hit the Showers"	Brad Birch	November 18, 1996
"Lassie Go Home": All the kids at Middlestick Elementary bring their pets into the win best pet award. "Hit the Showers": As if gym class wasn't bad enough, Bradley and Stacy also have to suffer through the ever-gross school shower.
10	10	"This is a Hiccup!"	Nicole Keefler	November 25, 1996
10	10	"Disciplinary Action"	Graham Clegg	November 25, 1996
"This is a Hiccup!": Stacy's hiccups become contagious when it spreads the entire neighborhood. "Disciplinary Action": Bradley thinks Stacy was got to be interrogated about him putting whoopie cushions in Mr. Lederhosen's shoes when goes to Principal Coffin's dungeon.
11	11	"Buttnocchio"	Dan Redican	December 2, 1996
11	11	"Dill, Man of Letters"	Hugh Duffy	December 2, 1996
"Buttnocchio": Instead of getting muffin mix for Stella, Bradley and Stacy sneak into a movie theater and tell lies to grown ups. "Dill, Man of Letters": Dill takes Stacy and Bradley to the library to escape from Lance and Russell.
12	12	"Coat of Many Troubles"	Bob Ardiel	December 9, 1996
12	12	"Environmentally Frenzied"	Bob Ardiel	December 9, 1996
"Coat of Many Troubles": Stella gives Stacy a new coat, which makes her become the new popular girl in school. However, she soon discovers it has a dark secret. "Environmentally Frenzied": Stacy and Bradley are forced to, along with the other kids, make a pro-environmentalist project.
13	13	"Photo Oops"	Patrick Granleese & Hugh Nellson	September 25, 1996
13	13	"Casa Blank Stare"	Erika O'Reilly	September 25, 1996
"Photo Oops": Stacy, to prevent having the same bad dream over and over again, does picture day her way. "Casa Blank Stare": Stacy and Bradley argue over which types of movies are "classics".

=== Season 2 (1997) ===
This is the only season that was animated in Adobe Flash at Bardel Entertainment located in Vancouver, British Columbia, who had also provided the storyboards since its previous season. Every episode this season was directed by John Halfpenny and Doug Thoms.

No. overall	No. in season	Title	Written by	Original release date
14	1	"Lights Out"	Graham Clegg	January 20, 1997
14	1	"Do the Russell"	Bob Adriel	January 20, 1997
"Lights Out": When Stacy and Bradley discover Lance is afraid of the dark, they use this as an advantage to get back at him and Russell. "Do the Russell": The kids try to entertain themselves when a storm prevents them from having recess.
15	2	"Hold It!"	Jamie Tatham	January 27, 1997
15	2	"Journey to the Center of Stacy's Closet"	Ken Ross	January 27, 1997
"Hold It!": Bradley drinks six cans of Mr. Fizzy and desperately searches for a bathroom to pee in. "Journey to the Center of Stacy's Closet": Even though she's supposed to clean her closet, Stacy and Bradley go on a spelunking adventure. Note: Stacy's name is incorrectly spelled as "Stacey" in the title card.
16	3	"Gross Anatomy"	John May	February 3, 1997
16	3	"Stacy and Bradley Sittin' in a Tree"	Bonnie Chung	February 3, 1997
"Gross Anatomy": Stacy and Bradley journey into Dill's body. "Stacy and Bradley Sittin' in a Tree": After a rumor stating Stacy and Bradley are dating spreads, they quit being friends.
17	4	"Bar None"	Nicole Keefler	February 10, 1997
17	4	"All Washed Up"	Dave Dias	February 10, 1997
"Bar None": Selling chocolate bars for a school trip leads to an adventure in the ruthless world of big business. "All Washed Up": After having to constantly clean up after the kids at the Latchkey Complex, Stanley volunteers the gang in the Saturday Morning Garbage Patrol.
18	5	"It's My Parties"	Laura Kosterski	February 17, 1997
18	5	"Do the Hooky Pokey"	John May & Suzanne Bolch	February 17, 1997
"It's My Parties": Stacy finds herself in the middle of a war when Stella and Stanley are each throwing simultaneous birthday parties for her. "Do the Hooky Pokey": Stacy and Bradley skip school then eventually driven back for their own fear of trouble.
19	6	"What's the Flap, Jack?"	Ben Joseph	February 24, 1997
19	6	"Pool Party"	Dan Redican	February 24, 1997
"What's the Flap, Jack?": Stacy and Bradley spend their entire day trying to break world records by making the biggest pancake. "Pool Party": Bradley, Russell and Lance try to sneak into Melody's "girly" party once they hear that the party will have a good deal of Mr. Fizzy and cake at the swimming pool.
20	7	"Temper, Temper"	Kate Barris	September 19, 1997
20	7	"Aquachumps"	Rob Pincombe & Shelley Hoffman	September 19, 1997
"Temper, Temper": Stacy and Bradley's teasing of each other causes an accidental feud between themselves, their friends, enemies and families. "Aquachumps": Bradley uses "Aqua Chimps" to become famous. Meanwhile, Frank has gone desperately hungry over his own bowl that Bradley used for his "Aqua Chimps".
21	8	"Mouse in the Midst"	John May & Suzanne Bolch	November 3, 1997
21	8	"Texas Chainsaw-Ectomy"	Ben Joseph	November 3, 1997
"Mouse in the Midst": Stacy's home supply of food disappears when the mice overrunning the streets. "Texas Chainsaw-Ectomy": Bradley tries to avoid his tonsillectomy.
22	9	"Report Card of Doom"	Ken Ross	November 10, 1997
22	9	"Ring Toss"	Nicole Keefler	November 10, 1997
"Report Card of Doom": The kids receive very weird report card grades. As it turns out, the weird grades are printed errors when Bradley accidentally crashed the whole line of school computers earlier in the episode, leaving Russell mistakenly chosen for the youngest genius program as he builds a stink bomb. "Ring Toss": Stacy accidentally throws away Stella's diamond wedding ring while pretending to be a princess, and Lance and Russell want to cash it in for money.
23	10	"Doll Day Afternoon"	Laura Kosterski	November 17, 1997
23	10	"Send in the Clones"	Frank Young	November 17, 1997
"Doll Day Afternoon": Bradley's overpowering desire to own a megadestroyer action figure serves as a catalyst for him and Stacy to organize a used toy sale. "Send in the Clones": When Stacy and Bradley photocopy themselves, the photocopies come to life and they do Stacy and Bradley's work. They later get tired of doing the work and later become rogue.
24	11	"What's the Scoop?"	Bonnie Chung	November 24, 1997
24	11	"Doddler's List"	Hugh Duffy	November 24, 1997
"What's the Scoop?": Stacy and Bradley join the school newspaper, but things go terribly awry when their idea of a news headline results in Mr. Lederhosen and Mrs. Mobley getting suspended from Middlestick Elementary. "Doddler's List": It's summer vacation, and when the kids have nothing to do, Mr. D sends them out on a scavenger hunt.
25	12	"Have a Cow, Man"	Graham Clegg	December 1, 1997
25	12	"Ice Cream, You Scream"	Rob Pincombe & Shelley Hoffman	December 1, 1997
"Have a Cow, Man": Bradley and Stacy must consult Mr. D on the matters of farming, when a serious shortage of Cheez Poopers in the Latchkey Gardens area occurs. "Ice Cream, You Scream": Stacy and Bradley rush to get ice cream from an ice cream truck, but it disappears the moment they get there. When Mr. D tells them that the owner of the ice cream truck froze to death after he fell off a cliff, they investigate to see if the truck's ghost is haunting them.
26	13	"The Great Outside"	Laura Kosterski	December 8, 1997
26	13	"The Treasure of Sierra Latchkey"	Gary Wheeler	December 8, 1997
"The Great Outdoors": Stacy and Bradley both disagree on the definition of "roughing it". "The Treasure of Sierra Latchkey": Stacy and Bradley find a winning token in a bag of Cheez Poopers. But when Frank takes it, they must get it back.

=== Season 3 (1998) ===
The show switches back to traditional animation, provided by Hanho Heung-Up in Seoul, South Korea, alongside with Canuck Creations in Toronto.

No. overall	No. in season	Title	Directed by	Written by	Original release date
27	1	"Battle of the Band"	John Van Bruggen	Ben Joseph	January 19, 1998
27	1	"The Scarlet Pimple"	Chad Hicks	Laura Kosterski	January 19, 1998
"Battle of the Band": Stacy and Bradley watch a rock music video, but Stella prefers if they could spend some time outside. So they form a rock band, but have trouble finding members. "The Scarlet Pimple": Stacy awakens to find that she has a pimple on her face and worries that people will run away from her.
28	2	"We're Doomed!"	Chad Hicks	Gary Wheeler	January 26, 1998
28	2	"It's Gone Baby, Wheel Gone"	Chad Hicks	Gary Pearson	January 26, 1998
"We're Doomed!": Bradley thinks the world will end after seeing a tabloid in the newspaper, and decides to spend his last day pranking Lance and Russell, spending all his money, and sending a spitball to Principal Coffin, but Stacy knows the world won't end. "It's Gone Baby, Wheel Gone": Bradley loses his bike. So he and Stacy try to find it.
29	3	"A Man Named Gym"	Chad Hicks	Shane MacDougall	February 2, 1998
29	3	"A Pizza Carol"	Chad Hicks	Ken Ross	February 2, 1998
"A Man Named Gym": Bradley becomes a sports jock. "A Pizza Carol": The kids are shocked when Bradley declares that he is going to be the first kid ever in the Latchkey Garden apartments to order a 32-slice mega pizza.
30	4	"Scared Stupid"	Doug Thoms	Jaimie Tatham	February 9, 1998
30	4	"Bad News"	Doug Thoms	Rob Pincombe & Shelley Hoffman	February 9, 1998
"Scared Stupid": Stacy and Bradley watch a horror movie. "Bad News": Stacy and Bradley begin a paper route.
31	5	"The Great Race"	Doug Thoms	Frank Young	February 16, 1998
31	5	"The Ghost and Mr. Coffin"	Doug Thoms	Mark Leiren-Young	February 16, 1998
"The Great Race": Stacy and Bradley compete in a go-kart race for Dill's birthday. "The Ghost and Mr. Coffin": Stacy and Bradley don't know what to wear for Halloween.
32	6	"Tree's Company"	Doug Thoms	Laura Kosterski	February 23, 1998
32	6	"Dear Diary"	Doug Thoms	Shane MacDougall	February 23, 1998
"Tree's Company": Stacy and Bradley form a treehouse club. "Dear Diary": Bradley wants Stacy to bring back his overdue library book.
33	7	"Slime-a-Bean"	Doug Thoms	Scott Kraft	March 2, 1998
33	7	"Voice of Doom"	Doug Thoms	Nadine van der Velde	March 2, 1998
"Slime-a-Bean": Bradley comes over to Stacy's for dinner. "Voice of Doom": Stacy and Bradley compete to see who can throw their voices farther.
34	8	"Mission: Implausible"	Doug Thoms	Ben Joseph	March 9, 1998
34	8	"Saturday Afternoon Fever"	Doug Thoms	Laura Kosterski	March 9, 1998
"Mission: Implausible": Stacy and Bradley become secret agents. "Saturday Afternoon Fever": Stacy and Bradley lose all sense of decorum in their quest for the most elusive of all collectible action figures: Arm Sling Andy.
35	9	"Little Barbershop of Horrors"	Doug Thoms	Brad Birch	March 16, 1998
35	9	"Hippity Hop to the Top"	Doug Thoms	Ben Joseph	March 16, 1998
"Little Barbershop of Horrors": To avoid missing the season finale of his favorite show, Bradley skips a haircut that his mom assigned him to do. "Hippity Hop to the Top": Lance and Russell seek revenge on Bradley's pet frog after Bradley feeds him Lance's pet fly.
36	10	"Wimbled-uh"	Doug Thoms	Rob Pincombe & Shelley Hoffman	March 23, 1998
36	10	"Naptitude, Dude"	Doug Thoms	Scott Kraft	March 23, 1998
"Wimbled-uh": Stacy breaks her arm, preventing her from playing a school table tennis tournament with Bradley. "Naptitude, Dude": Bradley studies for an aptitude test.
37	11	"We're Outta Here"	Doug Thoms	Dave Dias	March 30, 1998
37	11	"Night of the Living Doddler"	Doug Thoms	Bonnie Chung	March 30, 1998
"We're Outta Here": Fed up with life at the Latchkey Garden apartments, Stacy and Bradley leave home. "Night of the Living Doddler": Scary noises come to be heard in the Latchkey apartments.
38	12	"Christmas of Doom!"	Doug Thoms	Hugh Duffy	April 6, 1998
Stanley regretfully tells Stacy and Bradley that the Latchkey Garden apartments will be demolished.
39	13	"Lo-o-o-ong Weekend"	Doug Thoms	Scott Kraft	April 13, 1998
39	13	"Goodbye, Adios, Sayonara Bradley"	Doug Thoms	Ken Ross	April 13, 1998
"Lo-o-o-ong Weekend": Bradley is desperate for Mr. Lederhosen's Friday afternoon gym class to end, so he and Stacy can go to the Soaked-till-Sick Waterpark. But something weird happens every time they try to duck out just five teeny weenie minutes early. "Goodbye, Adios, Sayonara Bradley": In the series finale, Bradley is moving away from Latchkey Garden Apartments and even Lance and Russell get a little teary-eyed.
