= List of Kodocha episodes =

This is a list of episodes of the anime Kodocha.

== Series overview ==
Season	Episodes	Originally released	
Season	Episodes	First released	Last released
1	51	April 5, 1996	March 28, 1997
2	51	April 4, 1997	March 27, 1998

== Episodes ==
=== Season 1 (1996–1997) ===
No.	Title	Original release date
1	"I'm an Elementary School Student with a Pimp/I'm an Elementary School Student with an Agent"; Transliteration: "Watashi, Himo Iru Shōgakusei" (Japanese: 私、ヒモいる小学生)	April 5, 1996
Sana Kurata, a Grade 6 elementary school student at Jinbou School, becomes the star of a variety show called "Child's Toy". Her classroom is messed by a troublemaker named Akito Hayama. When Sana tries to confront Akito, he ignores her, leading her to get angry. Out of frustration, she complains about Akito live on her TV show. The next day at school, Sana is confronted by the Akito's goons for her actions. While getting ready to fight them off, Akito shows up and tells the boys to leave her alone, leaving Sana wondering why he would do that after what she said about him on TV.
2	"The Whole Classroom is a Monkey Mountain"; Transliteration: "Kyōshitsu Marugoto Saru no Yama" (Japanese: 教室まるごとサルの山)	April 12, 1996
Sana continues to confront Akito, and the girls in the class join her. Akito kidnaps a classmate named Mami and has his goons dump her in a pond for calling him a monster. This infuriates Sana even more, and she slaps Akito in retaliation. The two proceed to talk in private and exchange threats towards each other, after which Sana becomes determined to find his weakness.
3	"Operation Eyeball, Toothball"; Transliteration: "Mendama Handama Sakusen da!" (Japanese: 目ン玉歯ン玉作戦だ!)	April 19, 1996
With the help of Akito's best friend, Tsuyoshi Ohki, Sana learns about Akito's weakness, a fear of heights. She then confidently tries to exploit it by challenging Akito to a bungee-jumping contest and ends up losing herself. However, Rei gives her an even better idea: to take an embarrassing picture of Akito as blackmail.
4	"Lone Wolf, Awooo!"; Transliteration: "Ippikiōkami Hyu-rururu" (Japanese: 一匹狼ヒュールルル)	April 26, 1996
Akito has stopped acting up because of the picture while another boy, Shinichi Gomi, declares himself as the school's new "boss monkey". Akito and Gomi challenge each other to a fight, but Sana threatens to release the picture of Akito if he fights back because Sana insists violence is not the answer. After Gomi insults her, a reluctant Sana changes her mind and allows one punch from Akito, who knocks out Gomi in one punch. Meanwhile, Sana seems concerned about Akito keeping to himself.
5	"Naughty Hayama, Where Are You Going? Where are You Going Mr. Dark and Gloomy?"; Transliteration: "Hayama Guregure Doko e Iku" (Japanese: 羽山グレグレどこへ行く)	May 3, 1996
While Sana get Akito open up, Sana gets a glimpse of a family very different from her own, the Hayama family. She learns that Akito's mom died giving birth to him and his sister Natsumi blames him for her death.
6	"An Oyakodon Fool, Too Yucky to Eat/Crazy Stew Family Crisis"; Transliteration: "Oyakodon Baka Mazukute Kuen" (Japanese: 親子丼バカまずくて食えん)	May 10, 1996
Sana is determined to make an impression with her next job on a TV drama, which is about a family with problems similar to the Hayamas. She even drags Akito's father home to watch it, only to fail to get the whole family to watch it together as Akito disappears. When Sana finds Akito, she pretends to be his mom and realizes he has a fever. For the first time, Akito's father walks up and takes him home, leaving Sana watching them go happily.
7	"Kurumi and the Round and Round Love Rivalry/Asako Kurumi... Rival in Love!"; Transliteration: "Kurumi Kurukuru Koigataki" (Japanese: 来海クルクル恋敵)	May 17, 1996
Whenever Sana meets her drama co-star Asako, her manager Rei always disappears. Asako asks Sana to do a "chat" with her, to which Sana agrees. Rei tries to get out of driving her by pretending to have a stomachache but is caught. During the "chat", Sana reveals that she found Rei as a homeless bum before he became her manager.
8	"A Juice-drenched First Kiss/A Fruit Juice Soaked First Kiss"; Transliteration: "Jūsu-mamire no Hatsu Kissu" (Japanese: ジュースまみれの初キッス)	May 24, 1996
Sana learns why Rei has been acting weirdly as she heard Asako is his ex-girlfriend from high school, so she thinks that the field trip will help her forget out them. On the top floor, Akito starts feeling sick. Sana overhears how juice helped relieve her friend, Hisae, during the elevator ride and runs to get some juice for Akito. On her way back to Akito, she trips and spills the juice all over him. While Sana is wiping the juice off Akito, he leans forward and kisses her.
9	"Pinch Pinch, Sana's Love/Double Double Sana's Love Trouble"; Transliteration: "Pinchi Pinchi no Sana no Koi" (Japanese: ピンチピンチの紗南の恋)	May 31, 1996
After her freak-out, Sana copes with her surprising first kiss. Meanwhile, Misako forces Rei to summon Akito to get to know him better while Asako visits Rei in an attempt to finally patch things up.
10	"Tweet Tweet, Love Flew Away/Love Flew Out the Window Like a Chicken!"; Transliteration: "Koi wa Piyopiyo Tondetta" (Japanese: 恋はピヨピヨとんでった)	June 7, 1996
Sana meets Aono, Tsuyoshi's younger sister, who believes that an egg bought from a store can hatch into a chicken. Much to Akito's objections, decides to swap Aono's egg with a pleasant surprise, a chick. Sana's argument is that kids do not have to know the truth about everything, but she is later forced to face her own reality when she finds out that Rei is not in love with her.
11	"Father, You Are His Father/Mr. Hayama, You're a Real Dad"; Transliteration: "Chichi yo, Anata wa Chichi Datta" (Japanese: 父よ、あなたは父だった)	June 14, 1996
Sana becomes a little more grown-up about the situation with Asako and Rei, and goes back to focusing more on her work, taking on several commercials with her Child's Toy co-star, Zenjiro. Meanwhile, the Hayama family has a family emergency when their father is rushed to the hospital. Akito calls Sana and she goes to the hospital to confort him. As an easy way to reach out to each other, Sana gives Akito a Burutcha buzzer.
12	"This Time, Sana is the Lonely Wolf/This Time, Sana is the Lone Wolf"; Transliteration: "Kondo wa Sana ga Ronrī Urufu" (Japanese: 今度は紗南がロンリーウルフ)	June 21, 1996
Rei has been signing Sana up for too many commercials. After working too hard, Sana forgets a promise she made to her friend Hisae about attending her birthday party. She and her other friends get very mad and refuse to speak to her. However, as Akito and Tsuyoshi stand up for her, Hisae and the others forgive Sana.
13	"My Name's Going to Change"; Transliteration: "Boku no Namae ga Kawarimasu" (Japanese: 僕の名前が変わります)	June 28, 1996
Tsuyoshi misses school one day, and Akito and Sana get together to help their friend. Tsuyoshi's parents have gotten a divorce, and Tsuyoshi's mother needed help moving. Once they all get back to school, Tsuyoshi's family name is now Sasaki and another one of Sana's friends, Aya reveals her feelings about Tsuyoshi.
14	"The Summer of Promise: Part 1/The Promised Summer: Part 1"; Transliteration: "Yakusoku no Natsu: Sono Zenpen" (Japanese: 約束の夏・その前編)	July 5, 1996
Everyone is excited about a class camping trip. While Sana looks cheerful as usual, Akito notices that she is worried. Sana is worried about the promise she and her mother Misako made to each other, which if fulfilled, might ruin the happy life they had. The school's vice principal, Ms. Sumire Andoh consistently nags the teachers and students to keep peace and order during the trip, but once Zenjiro and the rest of "Child's Toy" crew crash the trip, Ms. Ando discovers the joy of limbo-dancing.
15	"The Summer of Promise: Part 2/The Promised Summer: Part 2"; Transliteration: "Yakusoku no Natsu: Sono Tsuzuki" (Japanese: 約束の夏・その続き)	July 12, 1996
Akito does his best to comfort a distraught Sana, who is still fearing the potential aftermath of Misako's book getting published. He thanks Sana for repairing his homelife and sticking by his side, then put her through in the past. Sana returns from the class trip and learns that her next job will be a commercial with the popular child actor, Naozumi Kamura.
16	"Heart-pounding Twice Over/Two Pounding Hearts"; Transliteration: "Doki-doki Futatsu Atta to sa" (Japanese: ドキドキふたつあったとさ)	July 19, 1996
Sana performs in a play and invites her classmates, teachers, and Naozumi. Akito gets jealous after Naozumi gives her flower on stage and makes a big decision about his life.
17	"Ah, What a Surprise! Mother's Book/Mother's Book of Surprises"; Transliteration: "Ah to Tamageta, Haha no Hon" (Japanese: アッとたまげた母の本)	July 26, 1996
Misako has released her book, My Daughter and I, which reveals that Sana was found abandoned. Both Akito and Naozumi try to help Sana through the pressures of intense media attention. After hearing about Sana's childhood, Akito rushes over there, barges in, and drags her to his house to avoid the media.
18	"Two Hungry People Playing Hide and Seek"; Transliteration: "Harapeko Ni-nin ga Kakurenbo" (Japanese: 腹ペコ二人がかくれんぼ)	August 2, 1996
Sana stays the night with the Hayama family, but she gets hungry in the middle of the night. Sana in disguise and Akito walk to the nearest convenience store to pick up some ingredients for ramen. Later that night, Sana has a moment of vulnerability when thinking about her mother wanting to give her to her birth mother, in which Akito vows to protect her.
19	"Daughter Cries, Mother Cries too/Daughter Cries, Mother Cries"; Transliteration: "Musume Naku-naku Haha mo Naku" (Japanese: 娘泣く泣く母も泣く)	August 9, 1996
Sana meets her biological mother, Keiko Sakai, and her half-sister, Mariko. Sana has fun with her little sister at the amusement park, but when her biological mother asks her to come live with her, Sana turns her down and tells her she will never see her again. Afterwards, Misako and Sana have a heart-to-heart talk.
20	"Feeling Good with Sana-chan Quiz/Sana's Super Happy Quiz Show"; Transliteration: "Sana-chan Kuizu de Ī Kanji" (Japanese: 紗南ちゃんクイズでイー感じ)	August 16, 1996
This is a recap episode about quiz show hosted by series mascot, Babbit, and Kodocha host, Zenjiro, recapping from the start of the story to the end of the love-triangle arc. The contestants are Sana, Akito, Zenjiro's manager, and a caricature of series creator, Miho Obana. During the quiz show, Akito beats Sana at her own game, while Babbit is having fun messing with Sana at her expense.
21	"It Could be a Small-Size Hayama/Look Out! It's a Pint-Sized Akito!"; Transliteration: "Sumōru Saizu no Hayama Kamo" (Japanese: スモールサイズの羽山かも)	August 23, 1996
Sana visits Kamura Academy with Naozumi. She meets a small boy, who seems to be like Akito. Once Sana reaches her limit with the boy, she summons Rei to get some supplies so she goes through a chain of events to defeat him. However, the real Akito along with Tsuyoshi hitch a ride with Rei and witness the events unfold.
22	"Heart of Karate and Announcement of Retirement/Karate Heart, Quitting Blues"; Transliteration: "Karate na Kokoro to Intai Sengen" (Japanese: カラテな心と引退宣言)	August 30, 1996
Akito begins studying karate but is unhappy with his first lessons. Meanwhile, Sana considers dropping out of show business which could potentially put Rei out of a job.
23	"Sunny, With Occasional Disappearing"; Transliteration: "Hare Tokidoki Yukue Fumei" (Japanese: 晴れときどき行方不明)	September 6, 1996
Sana helps find Mariko, who sneaks into the set of Child's Toy to find Sana. She encounters Zenjiro, who is now stuck with the little girl until he can find her parents.
24	"Math Life Drives Me Batty/Math Mess"; Transliteration: "Sansū Jinsei Bokerattā" (Japanese: 算数人生ボケラッター)	September 13, 1996
Principal Narunaru goes on a business trip, and Ms. Andoh takes this opportunity to threaten Class 3 of failing them and preventing them from advancing to junior high school. Sana freaks out over her poor mathematics skills, and Akito sturs up troubles again with another photo, demanding that the proficiency test be canceled.
25	"A Band-Aid for the Heart?/A Bandage for a Broken Heart"; Transliteration: "Kokoro no Kizu no Bansōkō?" (Japanese: 心の傷のバンソーコー？)	September 20, 1996
Due to the pond incident earlier in the school year, where Mami was almost drowned by Akito and his old goons, she is now traumatized and scared of him. Meanwhile, Sana tries to help Akito fix this, only to fail their attempts.
26	"Cockadoodledoo! Morning is Coming/Every Chicken Has Its Day"; Transliteration: "Kokekokkō no Asa wa Kuru" (Japanese: コケコッコーの朝は来る)	September 27, 1996
Sana's gift to Aono, the little baby chick, has now become a full-grown rooster. Now that the Sasaki family is living in an apartment, the chicken – named Piyoko – has become an inconvenience to the family and their neighbors. Sana offers to keep the chicken at her house but proves to be equally too much to handle for the Kurata household.
27	"Give Me Sympathy and Lend Me Money/Pity Me and Cough Up Some Dough"; Transliteration: "Dōjō mo Shite Kane Kashite" (Japanese: 同情もしてカネかして)	October 4, 1996
Misako's ex-husband, Ryousuke Kashima, asks Sana for a favor, Akito and Tsuyoshi become worried about her and decide to follow them around.
28	"Love Love Father Hayama's Song/The Romantic Love Song of Mr. Hayama"; Transliteration: "Rabu-rabu Hayama Chichi no uta" (Japanese: らぶらぶ羽山父の歌)	October 11, 1996
Sana and Tsuyoshi visit Akito's mother's grave with the Hayama family, which is also Akito's Birthday. Sana, Tsyoshi, and Natsumi meet a mysterious woman and think that she is Mr. Hayama's new girlfriend.
29	"Here She Comes, Mama's Mama"; Transliteration: "Yattekimashita Mama no Mama" (Japanese: やって来ました母の母)	October 18, 1996
Misako's mother Shizuka visits Misako and Sana in Tokyo. Grandma Shizuka brings with her quite a few other visitors. When Misako refuses to cooperate with Shizuka's schemes, she turns her attention to Sana.
30	"My Boyfriend has to Grin and Bear It/Rei and the Jolly Green-Eyed Monster"; Transliteration: "Watashi no Kare Hayase gaman" (Japanese: 私の彼はやせ我慢)	October 25, 1996
Asako stars in a romantic drama with popular performer Takuya Kimochi, and rumors begin. Rei gets jealous and distracted because of a love scene.
31	"The Snake Stomps in with His Shoes Still On/A Snake Came Slithering in Muddy Shoes"; Transliteration: "Hebi ga Dosoku de Zūka-zuka" (Japanese: へびが土足でヅーカヅカ)	November 1, 1996
A tabloid photographer named Kurosaki is determined to get a scoop on Sana. He brings Akito into the middle.
32	"Dad, You've Been Arrested/Daddy, You're Busted!"; Transliteration: "Chichi yo, Anata wa Tsukamatta" (Japanese: 父よ あなたはつかまった)	November 8, 1996
Tsuyoshi's father is thrown in jail, and Tsuyoshi and his sister are picked on by their classmates. When it's time for Tsuyoshi's father to get out of jail, he wants to go see him when he gets out.
33	"Love Tasted Like a Curry/Love Tastes Like Curry"; Transliteration: "Ai wa Karē no Ajigashita" (Japanese: 愛はカレーの味がした)	November 15, 1996
The students of Class 3 battle it out over after-school cleaning chores and is escalated further once Ms. Mitsuya and Mr. Tanaka argue about their upcoming wedding and their life after marriage. Ms. Mitsuya takes the girls' side and Mr. Tanaka takes the boys' side. Aya and Tsuyoshi cannot stand being apart during the fighting. Sana proclaims war, while Akito just sits back and refuses to participate.
34	"A Singing Heart Goes 3, 2, 1/Three, Two, One: Sing!" "A Singing Heart Goes 3, 2, 1"; Transliteration: "Utau Kokoro wa 3, 2, 1" (Japanese: 歌う心は3，2，1)	November 22, 1996
Sana plans to host a party for Zenjiro's birthday. She on the way meets two fellow child stars, with one of them being a total diva named Mayu, who hates her. Eventually, Sana's ability to have instant happiness begins to rub off on Mayu.
35	"There's a Reason for These Presents/There's a Reason for the Gift" "There Is a Reason For These Presents"; Transliteration: "Puresento ni wa Wake ga aru" (Japanese: プレゼントにはワケがある)	November 29, 1996
Tsuyoshi receives an anonymous gift. He avoids Aya because he falls in love with any girl who gives him a present and is too he's ashamed to speak to her.
36	"Take Me To Kusatsu"; Transliteration: "Watashi o Kusatsu ni Tsuretette" (Japanese: 私を草津につれてって)	December 6, 1996
Winter vacation brings a trip to the Kurata Hot Springs Inn in Kusatsu. The Hayama family are surprise guests, invited by her matchmaking grandmama, Shizuka. Akito and Sana overhear another family threatening to take over the inn because no one wants to inherit it from Sana's family, and Sana begins to consider moving there.
37	"Kiss, Fight, Karate and Trumpet/Karate and Trumpet Compete for a Kiss"; Transliteration: "Kisu da Tatakae Karate to Rappa" (Japanese: キスだ戦えカラテとラッパ)	December 13, 1996
Akito stresses about trying to buy a gift for Sana, and Sana stresses about a job. Rei is distracted while looking forward to his Christmas Eve date with Asako. Out of nowhere, Naozumi confronts Akito with the intention of canceling Sana and Akito's upcoming middle birthday party, and the two challenge each other. While Sana worries about a kissing scene she and Naozumi have to do for a commercial scene, it turns out to be a simple peck on the cheek. This marks the only time Naozumi ever kisses Sana.
38	"A Heart-pounding Kiss on Christmas/The Special Christmas Kiss"; Transliteration: "Doki-doki Kisu na Kurisumasu" (Japanese: どきどきキスなクリスマス)	December 20, 1996
Sana hosts both birthdays of Akito and hers on Christmas. Akito was not sure what to get for Sana so he asks Tsuyoshi and Natsumi. They tell him that anything is good and to give her something from his heart, so he goes to the party empty-handed while Sana gives him a gift. At the end, he makes her a snowman which she loves, followed by a kiss. A shocked Sana left when Akito runs away right after their lips separate. Later, she wonders why she did not push him away or freak out like she did before. Sana quietly starts to develop genuine feelings for him.
39	"100 Haya-Months and the Scales of Fury/100 Haya-Moths"; Transliteration: "100-biki Hayagārin Pun-pun" (Japanese: 100匹ハヤガーりんぷんぷん)	January 3, 1997
39	"Babin-ga-bibin-ga-bonba-bibo/Ooga Booga Boo" (Japanese: ばびんがびびんがぼんばびぼー)	January 3, 1997
This episode is composed of two different segments in the vein of the American cartoons that were airing at the time. The first part focuses on moth versions of Akito, known as Haya-moths, turning everyone into moth versions of themselves. The second part is essentially a Flintstones-esque re-telling of the first couple of episodes in prehistoric times.
40	"Suddenly, One Day, I'm a Homeless Girl/Suddenly, I'm Homeless Sana!"; Transliteration: "Aru Hi Totsuzen Uchi-naki-ko" (Japanese: ある日突然家なき子)	January 10, 1997
The Kurata household copes with a major setback. While Sana and Misako remain optimistic, Rei faces greater obstacles as Sana's manager.
41	"He Got Me Blacklisted"; Transliteration: "Hosarechatta no Ano Hito ni" (Japanese: ホサレちゃったのあの人に)	January 17, 1997
Sana cannot find work but it seems to be bigger than people around her expected.
42	"The Delirious Nick-of-Time Deadline/Deadline's Here!"; Transliteration: "Shimekiri Giri-giri Kiri-kiri Mai" (Japanese: しめきりギリギリきりきりまい)	January 24, 1997
Onda had asked Sana to write a book. She puts it off until there is only about one week left. A frantic Sana tries to finish the book before the deadline.
43	"My Boyfriend is Like a Father to Me/Age Difference, Shmage Difference"; Transliteration: "Oyaji no yō na Kare Datta" (Japanese: オヤジのような彼だった)	January 31, 1997
Reporters believe Sana and Takeshi to be father and daughter, but Sana says that it is false and declares that they are lovers. Gomi's parents pressure him to apply to an advanced middle school. When the other students tease Gomi, he blames Akito for telling them and starts to beat Akito up together.
44	"Gomi, Gomi, Where Are You Going?"; Transliteration: "Gomi-kun, Gomi-kun, Doko Iku no" (Japanese: 五味くん五味くんどこ行くの)	February 7, 1997
Gomi does some shoplifting, and then he runs away. But, runs into Akito leaving the stolen loot. Akito gets blame for it. Gomi learns later that Akito wasn't the one that told about Gomi going to advance middle school. Gomi realizes what he has done. Gomi confesses to his crime.
45	"Mixed Feelings About Valentine Day/Bittersweet Valentine's Day"; Transliteration: "Hikikomogomo no Barentain" (Japanese: 悲喜こもごものバレンタイン)	February 14, 1997
Takeshi misses work, leading everyone to believe he drops out. Sana then searches for him.
46	"Am I Wrong For Running Away?/Am I Wrong?" "Am I Wrong For Running Away?"; Transliteration: "Nigeta Watashi ga Warui no ka?" (Japanese: 逃げた私が悪いのか)	February 21, 1997
Sana's book hit the store shelves, but Mami wasn't mentioned anywhere in the book.
47	"Under the Same Roof with You"; Transliteration: "Anata to Onaji Yane no Shita" (Japanese: あなたとおなじ屋根の下)	February 28, 1997
The apartment that Sana stayed in gets torn down, and for another week, the Kurata family is homeless. Misako takes a trip to study for her new book, and Rei plans to stay at a hotel with Sana, but Sana makes other plans.
48	"Father, You Were My Father"; Transliteration: "Chichi yo, Anata ga Chichi Datta" (Japanese: 父よ、あなたが父だった)	March 7, 1997
Misako learns something about Takeshi. Later Sana and Takeshi go to shoot a scene in their drama, and then Takeshi collapses during the shooting and ambulance takes him to a hospital.
49	"This is Our Last Scene/The Final Scene"; Transliteration: "Kore ga Futari no Rasuto Shīn" (Japanese: これがふたりのラストシーン)	March 14, 1997
Takeshi find outs that Sana is actually his daughter. He leaves the hospital to go shoot the drama with Sana. He dies at the end from a chronic disease with Sana in his arms.
50	"Spring Comes in an Avalanche of Tears/Through the Tears, Spring Comes"; Transliteration: "Namida na Darete Haru ga Kuru" (Japanese: 涙なだれて春が来る)	March 21, 1997
Depressed by Takeshi's death, Sana leaves for the mountains and Akito convinces her to come home.
51	"Up to Today and As of Tomorrow/Goodbye Yesterday, Hello Tomorrow"; Transliteration: "Ima made, Soshite Ashita kara" (Japanese: 今日まで、そして明日から)	March 28, 1997
This episode focuses on Zenjiro recruiting several of Sana's friends to discuss the relationship between Sana and Akito. They wear masks to conceal their identities.

=== Season 2 (1997–1998) ===
No.	Title	Original release date
52	"The Best Friend I Met in the Toilet/I Made a New Friend In the Bathroom"; Transliteration: "Toire de Deatta Dai Shin'yū" (Japanese: トイレで出会った大親友)	April 4, 1997
On her first day of middle school, Sana meets a new girl named Fuka in the bathroom. The two girl discover they have much in common and quickly become good friends, but Fuka slaps Akito.
53	"My Life Plan Went Kaput All Because of a Kiss"; Transliteration: "Jinsei Keikaku Kissu de Buttsun" (Japanese: 人生計画キッスでブッツン)	April 11, 1997
Fuka tells Sana why she slapped Akito and about how he ruined her life by stealing her first kiss in kindergarten.
54	"Sana Wasn't Ready For Love"; Transliteration: "Koi ni wa Hanpa na Sana Datta" (Japanese: 恋にはハンパな紗南だった)	April 18, 1997
Sana tells Tsuyoshi that she does not believe in love anymore due to what happened with Rei.
55	"The Actress is Holing Up in the Mountains"; Transliteration: "Joyū wa Oyama ni Komorimasu" (Japanese: 女優はお山にこもります)	April 25, 1997
Sana leaves to film a movie in a secluded mountain area.
56	"I'm Seriously, Seriously, For Real, Serious"; Transliteration: "Honto ni Honto ni Honki ni Honto" (Japanese: ホントにホントにホン気にホント)	May 2, 1997
They arrive at the shooting location, where Naozumi stops and just stares at Sana while shooting. He tells Sana that he is starting to fall in love with her.
57	"A Fakey Boyfriend Lured in by Sushi"; Transliteration: "Sushi ni Tsurarete Usongo Kareshi" (Japanese: スシにつられてウソンコ彼氏)	May 9, 1997
Fuka asks Akito to be her boyfriend by asking him to eat sushi so she will not lose in a face-off with her old friends.
58	"Love Love Times in the Mountains"; Transliteration: "Oyama ni Rabu-rabu Atta to sa" (Japanese: お山にラブラブあったとさ)	May 16, 1997
Naozumi confesses his feelings to Sana, only to get rejected.
59	"Getting Over Injuries and Storms"; Transliteration: "Kega mo Arashi mo Norikoete" (Japanese: ケガも嵐も乗り越えて)	May 23, 1997
Sana gets attacked by Naozumi's fans, since Naozumi likes her.
60	"Sometimes You Realize You're in Love Once You've Been Rejected"; Transliteration: "Furarete Kizuita Koi mo aru" (Japanese: フラれて気づいた恋もある)	May 30, 1997
Sana finds out that Akito is going out with her best friend, Fuka. She realizes that she is in love with him with Asako's help, but gets her heartbroken.
61	"I'm Not Going to Cry Just Because My Heart is Broken"; Transliteration: "Furarete Naiteru Watashi ja nai yo" (Japanese: フラれて泣いてる私じゃないよ)	June 6, 1997
Sana's mother visits her on the film set and tries to cheer her up.
62	"This Summer Literally Burned Up"; Transliteration: "Moetsukichatta no Kotoshi no Natsu wa" (Japanese: 燃えつきちゃったの今年の夏は)	June 13, 1997
In the scene where Sana is supposed to emerge from the burning mansion, she had started dancing inside, but her leg where Naozumi's fans hit her starts to hurt, so she is not able to move.
63	"You Can't Believe the Rumors"; Transliteration: "Uwasa wa Shinjichadamenanoyo" (Japanese: 噂は信じちゃダメなのよ)	June 20, 1997
The tabloids have been printing that Sana and Naozumi are going out, which her friends all believe. Sana gets upset that her friends all believed the media and did not ask her first. As she runs away, Akito calls her by her first name and asks her what she is upset about. Sana slaps him for not knowing and runs away again, leaving him surprised.
64	"The Truth Has to Be Somewhere"; Transliteration: "Dokka ni aru desho Honto no Koto ga" (Japanese: どっかにあるでしょホントのことが)	June 27, 1997
Naozumi reveals the facts about his relationship with Sana on live broadcast, and how the person Sana really likes was someone else. Naozomi says it was his revenge for Sana dumping him, but admits that because he wants her and Akito to be happy togethern, and knows Sana will never confess herself. The next day, Sana avoids Akito all day at school, she gets a minor injury and uses the excuse to hide in the infirmary. She finds that Akito is sleeping on the bed next to her and escapes just as he is waking up. Akito catches her in the corridor next to the infirmary and wants an explanation.
65	"And Now, Those Two Face a Long Bye-bye"; Transliteration: "Soshite, Ni-jin wa Rongu Baibai" (Japanese: そして二人はロングバイバイ)	July 4, 1997
After mutual confessions, Sana and Akito argue, but they are interrupted by a nurse. Overhearing their conversation, Fuka came to find out why Sana was gone for so long. Sana does not want to lose her best friend and tries to convince Fuka that her feelings for Akito are already in the past. As Akito approaches them, the situation gets more confused as Sana decides not to see both of them anymore. She waits for Akito, who is returning from training, and says that their relationship is now in the past. A crying Sana bids goodbye to Akito and tries to forget him, only to throw herself into work.
66	"Run Away, Run Away, Across the Sea"; Transliteration: "Nigechae, Nigechae, Umi Koete" (Japanese: 逃げちゃえ逃げちゃえ海越えて)	July 11, 1997
Sana cannot forget Akito, who also thinks about her all the time, getting into various troubles. A film with the participation of Sana and Naozumi is released on the screens and succeeds. Sana and Naozumi receive a letter from America, with an invitation to participate in one of the Broadway Musicals. Naozumi sees Sana's depression and suggests that she needs to accept this offer. The show Child's Toy, in which Sana began her career as an actress, is changing its format and becomes a program for women. Without telling any of her friends, she and Naozumi go to the airport, where Sana's friends catch up with her and try to find out when she will return. However, Sana herself does not know the answer to this question. As Akito eventually approaches the others, Sana sees that he has chosen Fuka. Naozumi notices it too and tries to comfort Sana.
67	"New York Is Filled With Suspense"; Transliteration: "Nyū Yōku-ttara Sasupensu" (Japanese: ニューヨークったらサスペンス)	July 18, 1997
When Sana and Naozumi arrive in New York, strange things keep on happening. They meet a boy named Brad, who looks identical to Hayama. A chandelier almost fell on them and a huge truck almost ran them over, with Sana and Naozumi believing that they are targeted. At night, Sana believes that she had seen a ghost.
68	"The World is Filled with Mysteries"; Transliteration: "Wataru Segen wa Nazo Bakari" (Japanese: 渡る世間は謎ばかり)	July 25, 1997
Rei goes to Hollywood to find Mr. Hamilton while Sana and Naozumi start rehearsal. Sana ends up getting hurt and Naozumi is pushed to his limit, after which the former gets a warning from Brad that they have been targeted.
69	"You Also Have Emerald Eyes"; Transliteration: "Anata no Hitomi mo Emerarudo" (Japanese: あなたの瞳もエメラルド)	August 1, 1997
Sana and Naozumi discover the "ghost", which turns out to be Michelle's daughter, Sicil. When she points her emerald eyes, her mom gets really mad for some odd reasons. As Rei returns from Hollywood, she finds out that Sana and Naozumi have been attacked again and all of them decide to move out of the mansion, after which they ended up in a hotel instead.
70	"Lunchtime Seems Dangerous"; Transliteration: "Ranchitaimu wa Kiken na Kanji" (Japanese: ランチタイムは危険な感じ)	August 8, 1997
Sana, Rei, and Naozumi spend their first night at the hotel. Naozumi encounters the strange man from before and just before he reveals the secret, Rei and Sana interrupt. During Sana and Naozumi's rehearsal, Rei looks for an apartment. Sicil runs away to be with Naozumi and Brad is jealous. They soon find out that Brad is the one terrorizing them. Mr. Hamilton then makes an appearance for the first time. As Sana and Naozumi are attacked, Mr. Gary Hamilton saves them.
71	"The Mother was a Complete Surprise"; Transliteration: "Nemimi ni Mizu no Haha Datta" (Japanese: 寝耳に水の母だった)	August 15, 1997
Brad reveals why he is terrorizing Sana and Naozumi. He wanted to push Naozumi away from Secil, since Secil was in love with Naozumi, but likes Secil. Naozumi meets his biological mother.
72	"You Found Out Too Much About My Secret"; Transliteration: "Shirisugichatta no Watashi no Himitsu" (Japanese: 知りすぎちゃったの私の秘密)	August 22, 1997
Brad tells Naozumi that Secil is actually his real sister, so Secil cannot love Naozumi. Naozumi runs away, crying because he did not know anything about Sicil being his sister, and was almost hit by a car.
73	"The Stupid American Parent and Child"; Transliteration: "Amerikan na Baka Oyako" (Japanese: アメーリカンなバカ親子)	August 29, 1997
Sicil thinks that nobody wants her and nobody loves her because she tore her leg tendon and can't dance, because at the hospital, Secil overheard her mom says that she doesn't want Sicil because she cannot dance. Sana cheers her up a bit and explains to Sicil why she should not be selfish and spoiled about such a reason. Meanwhile, Naozumi's mother, Yuko, is acting suspicious.
74	"The Mother is Happily Plotting Away"; Transliteration: "Haha wa Iso-isho Akudakumi" (Japanese: 母はいそいそ悪だくみ)	September 5, 1997
Yuko has decided to use Naozumi as a tool to get her fame. Yuko tells Gary that Naozumi's heart belongs to her, and she will only get away from Naozumi, as if Gary gives her one of the leading parts in one of the top ten Broadway shows.
75	"Where in Manhattan Is My Daughter?"; Transliteration: "Musume yo Doko ni Manhattan?" (Japanese: 娘よどこにマンハッタン)	September 12, 1997
Sicil overhears Yuko and Naozumi's conversation and discovers that Naozumi is her brother. She runs away and her parents are searching all over Manhattan for her. Every time they think they found Sicil, it turns out to be a different person, which leads to a comical situation.
76	"Should I Go Home? Maybe I Should"; Transliteration: "Kaecchaō kana? Kaero kana" (Japanese: 帰っちゃおーかな帰ろかな)	September 19, 1997
Naozumi finds out that his mom just used him to "be in the spotlight" and is shocked and Sana asks if he wants to go home. They decide to return to Japan.
77	"Papa, This Is Your Fault"; Transliteration: "Papa yo, Anata ga Warukatta" (Japanese: パパよ、あなたが悪かった)	September 26, 1997
Naozumi and Sana set up a meeting for the Hamilton family. Gary, Michelle, and Sicil talk out all their problems and become a closer family. They realize that everything is Gary's fault.
78	"First and Final Fight Between Parent and Child"; Transliteration: "Saisho de Saigo no Boshi de Kenka" (Japanese: 最初で最後の母子でケンカ)	October 3, 1997
Yuko's chance to shine is gone. Her crew gets mad at her and quits. The play is cancelled and she loses her mind. Rick does not know what to do, so he begs Naozumi to help her. However, Rick puts out all of his anger out on her instead, since she has done horrible things to him in the past and taken advantage of him currently too.
79	"There Are Fathers Who Just Can't Be Fathers"; Transliteration: "Chichi ni Narenai Chichi mo Ita" (Japanese: 父になれない父もいた)	October 10, 1997
Gary tells everyone that Naozumi is his son and that he is going to raise Naozumi as a big star. However, Naozumi does not want to stay in the United States, but wants to go back to Japan because he never thought of Gary as his father.
80	"Sing One More Time 3, 2, 1"; Transliteration: "Mō Ichido Utatte 3, 2, 1" (Japanese: も一度歌って3・2・1)	October 17, 1997
A crazy law passed prohibiting music in New York occurs. Sana and Naozumi continue to sing "Port City Charleston" then attempt to get this law repealed. Mayu and Tomomi, two other actors the same age as Sana, make another appearance as policeman.
81	"Hello, Goodbye, My Love"; Transliteration: "Harō, Gubbai, Watashi no Koi" (Japanese: ハロー・グッバイ・私の恋)	October 24, 1997
While Sana and Naozumi are returning to Japan on the plane, a flashback of everything that had happened so far during her middle school years is shown. However, the duo realize that they leave without Naozumi's manager.
82	"We've Been Getting Along Great Ever Since"; Transliteration: "Arekara Uchira wa Iikanji" (Japanese: あれからウチらはイー感じ)	October 31, 1997
After Naozumi and Sana went to New York, Akito and the others had continued their normal lives. As Akito seems to begin to like Fuka a little, they got a picture of them together in a magazine saying there a great couple.
83	"Only the Best Couples"; Transliteration: "Besuto Kappuru Bakari kamo" (Japanese: ベストカップルばかりカモ)	November 7, 1997
Sana's friends welcome her back and pay her a visit. She and Naozumi announce that they are officially a couple, but everyone can sense her discontent when she sees the photo of Akito and Fuka.
84	"The New Manager Is a PYT"; Transliteration: "Jaamanechan wa Piichipichi" (Japanese: ジャーマネちゃんはピーチピチ)	November 14, 1997
Naozumi is assigned a new manager called Riho, who seems to be nice on the outside but has ulterior motives.
85	"There Were Lines That Couldn't Be Said"; Transliteration: "Ienee Serifu mo Atta to sa" (Japanese: 言えねえセリフもあったとさ)	November 21, 1997
When overlooking her lines for a part in a movie, Sana sees that in a scene, she has to call another character a "devil". Fuka suffers an eye injury while trying to help Akito fight bullies in an arcade.
86	"Everything is Clearer Now That I Can't See"; Transliteration: "Mienakunattara Mietekita" (Japanese: 見えなくなったら見えてきた)	November 28, 1997
Now that Fuka is temporary blind, she realizes that Sana still likes Akito vice-versa. Fuka wants to break-up with Akito, knowing Sana and Akito's feelings for each other.
87	"Where are Fights and Separation?"; Transliteration: "Tatakare o Wakare, Doko e Iku" (Japanese: たたカレおわカレどこへ行く)	December 5, 1997
Fuka tells Akito not to come anymore, and that she wants to break up with him. Akito becomes somewhat sad and runs to the park, where he sees Sana again. They hug each other and almost confess their feelings for each other, but get interrupted. Riho learns from Rei why Sana had trouble saying "devil" and she tells Naozumi.
88	"So This Kind of Day Has Come"; Transliteration: "Itsuka Kita no Nekonda Hi ga" (Japanese: いつか来たのネこんな日が)	December 12, 1997
Sana does not have jobs anymore and takes a break and returns to school. When she visits Fuka, Fuka's mother tells Sana that Akito and Fuka have broken up because of her injury. Naozumi comes to Sana's house and says that they should break up since she still loves Akito.
89	"Hallelujah on Christmas Eve? My Heart"; Transliteration: "Ibu ni Hareruya? Waga Kokoro" (Japanese: イヴにハレルヤ？我がココロ)	December 19, 1997
Sana wonders whether or not she still has a chance with Akito. Naozumi calls Akito and tells him to watch the premiere of the series that Sana was fired from because she could not say her lines. Akito and Sana meet at a park and Akito made a snowman like last year. When they were about to say their feelings, Tsuyoshi and the others interrupt; everyone ended up having snowball fight.
90	"Mecha Hayama Mama is Mama Hayama"; Transliteration: "Meka Hayama Hahahahahahayama" (Japanese: メカハヤマハハハハハハヤマ)	December 30, 1997
90	"The Magical Curse is Uri Uri Urinal"; Transliteration: "Mahou no Noroi wa Beben no Benki" (Japanese: 魔法の呪いはベベンのベンキ)	December 30, 1997
Hayama's father builds a robot mother, who proceeds to destroy Tokyo. Magical Angel Sana tries to defeat Mecha-Hayama but is unexpectedly stopped by Akito. Sana is turned into a skunk, Akito is turned into a pig, Fuka is turned into a goat, and so on. Prince Naozumi is turned into a toilet seat and skunk Sana has to kiss him to undo the spell.
91	"The New Year Came and So Did a Fan"; Transliteration: "Akemashichattara Fan ga KIta" (Japanese: 明けましちゃったらファンが来た)	January 9, 1998
Sana's Fan Club contacts Sana because they are disappointed in her lack of work.
92	"The Easiest but Not Math Video"; Transliteration: "Chotto mo Kantan Busu Bideo" (Japanese: ちっともカンタン算数ビデオ)	January 16, 1998
Sana does not understand the fact that she is trying to teach for her new job.
93	"They're Appearing with the Same Name"; Transliteration: "Onnaji Namae de Deteimasu" (Japanese: おんなじ名前で出ています)	January 23, 1998
Sana gets a strange letter from someone using her name. The fake Sana sends letters to past directors and actors.
94	"If You Rock-and-Roll For a Kodocha Spring"; Transliteration: "Korogete Hajikeryako Kodocha na Haru yo" (Japanese: 転げてハジケりゃこどちゃな春よ)	January 30, 1998
After Zenjiro gets fired from his current series, Old Lady's Toy, he and Sana reunite and decide to relaunch Child's Toy under a new name.
95	"Things May Go Back to Normal"; Transliteration: "Osamarimashita ne Moto no Saya" (Japanese: おさまりましたね元のサヤ)	February 6, 1998
Takaishi and Fuka are now both single, can Sana and Zenjiro play cupid and help these two get together?
96	"Waiting but Rushing Adults in Love"; Transliteration: "Mottete Sugu Iku Otona no Koi" (Japanese: 待っててスグ行く大人の恋)	February 13, 1998
Asako is getting ready to leave for London, but Rei is not ready to give up his career for her.
97	"The Happiness Project: Now Lend Me Money"; Transliteration: "Shiawase Keikaku: Kane Kashite" (Japanese: しあわせ計画・金貸して)	February 20, 1998
Misako's ex-husband returns to ask for money seriously.
98	"Big Sis Seems to Be in Love"; Transliteration: "Oneechan Tara Koi-moyō" (Japanese: お姉ちゃんたら恋模様)	February 27, 1998
Akito's sister, Natsumi, falls in love with the perfect boy. However, she finds out that he is a massive playboy, who is dating many other girls.
99	"The Karate Club is Great. Come Check It Out."; Transliteration: "Karate-bu Yoitokochato Oide" (Japanese: カラテ部ヨイトコちょとオイデ)	March 6, 1998
Sana wants to form a karate club for Akito's sake, but they need at least five members and a faculty advisor. Nakao, a student in the same room as Akito, joins the club and Akito helps him with the Karate training. When they finish training, Sana, Ishida, and Akito go out to eat and they celebrate Sana's birthday. However, Nakao collapses at home.
100	"The Blackboard Erasers Disappeared"; Transliteration: "Kokuban Keshi ga Kiete ita" (Japanese: 黒板消しが消えていた)	March 13, 1998
Nakao, a karate club member, cannot find any meaning in his existence and chooses to rot away in the north wing with the blackboard erasers.
101	"All Three of Them Disappeared"; Transliteration: "San'nin Sorotte Kiete Ita" (Japanese: 三人そろって消えていた)	March 20, 1998
Fuka stands up for the students of Class 6-3 who start trash-talking about Akito and Sana. The pair are stuck in the window and cannot call for help, but their friends have noticed their disappearance and have informed the faculty. However, Nakao collapses while trying to help them out of the window.
102	""Kodocha" Continues Always and Forever"; Transliteration: ""Kodocha" wa Tsuzuku yo Doko-made-mo" (Japanese: 「こどちゃ」は続くよどこまでも)	March 27, 1998
Mr. Sengoku's evil revenge to expel Akito is revealed and decides to resign from his position. Later on the school's rooftop, Akito says that after he receives his black belt in Karate, he has something to tell Sana. Akito proceeds to kiss her for the last time. Upon giving Akito a comical beatdown, Sana says she has something to say and wishes him good luck on earning his black belt. The duo finally want to express their true feelings towards each other.
