= List of Hell Teacher: Jigoku Sensei Nube episodes =

This is a list of all Hell Teacher: Jigoku Sensei Nube episodes that have aired in Japan.

For the 1996 series, the opening theme is Baribari Saikyou No. 1 (lit. The No. 1 Greatest Hard-Worker) by Feel So Bad. From episodes 1-29, the first ending theme is Mienai Chikara ~Invisible One~ (lit. Unseen Power ~Invisible One~) by B'z. From episodes 30–47, the second ending theme is Spirit by Pamelah. For episode 48, the third ending theme is Baribari Saikyou No. 1. For the OVAs, the opening theme is News na Gakkou (lit. School News) by Sigetaka Takayama & Himawari Kids while the ending theme is Hurt by Cash.

For the 2025 series, the new anime television series adaptation was announced back in July 2024. It is produced by Studio Kai and directed by Yasuyuki Ōishi, with Yoshiki Ōkusa handling series composition, Yū Yoshiyama designing the characters, and Evan Call composing the music. The series, airing in split-cours, aired its first cours from July 2 to September 24, 2025, with the second cours premiered on January 7, 2026, on the brand new IMAnimation W programming block on TV Asahi and its affiliates. For the first cours, the opening theme song is "P0WER-AkuryoTaisan-" (P0WER-悪霊退散-), performed by Shintenchi Kaibyaku Shudan: Zigzag, while the ending theme song is "Sunflower" (ひまわり, Himawari), performed by Chilli Beans. For the second cours, the opening theme song is "Erase", performed by the Oral Cigarettes, while the ending theme song is "Magical", performed by Ayumu Imazu.

Remow licensed the series for streaming on the "It's Anime" YouTube channel in selected territories, including North America alongside other platforms, such as Netflix in Asian territories (except Japan and China), Aniverse (Germany and Austria), Anime Generation (Italy), Anime Onegai (Latin America), as well as MOD and Hami Video (Taiwan).

== Episodes ==
=== 1996 series ===
No.	Title	Original release date
1	"A Terrifying New School Term! The Mysterious Demon Hand"; Transliteration: "Kyōfu no Shingakuki! Nazo no Oni no Te" (Japanese: 恐怖の新学期! 謎の鬼の手)	April 13, 1996
A new school term begins; Hiroshi's heart is attacked by a Yōkai, so Nube must save his life.
2	"Hanako of the Toilet Has Appeared!"; Transliteration: "Toire no Hanako-san ga Detā!" (Japanese: トイレの花子さんが 出たぁ〜っ!)	April 20, 1996
Nube, Kyoko and Hiroshi investigate a ghost that appears in the bathroom.
3	"Rumors Won't Stop! The Five-Tongued Chatty Demon"; Transliteration: "Uwasabanashi wa Yamerarenai! Oshaberi-yōkai – Kyōfu no Go-mai-jita!" (Japanese: うわさ話はやめられない! おしゃべり妖怪·恐怖の五枚舌!)	April 27, 1996
A talkative youkai makes everybody hate Miki because of her harsh rumors. NOTE: In this episode, most of Nube's students find out about the oni no te, previously, only Kyoko and Hiroshi knew about it.
4	"Do Not Use!? The Kappa on the Horizontal Bars"; Transliteration: "Shiyō Kinshi!? Kappa no Deru Tetsubō" (Japanese: 使用禁止!? 河童の出る鉄棒)	May 4, 1996
A Kappa tries to stop the horizontal bars being used because there is a bomb.
5	"The School's Seven Mysteries – The Demon of the 13th Step"; Transliteration: "Gakkō no Nanafushigi Ma no Jūsan-kaidan" (Japanese: 学校の七不思議 魔の13階段)	May 11, 1996
Katsuya meets a troubled boy who makes him cross the 13th step.
6	"Nube Dies!? The Strongest Rival: Yōko Tamamo"; Transliteration: "Nūbē Shisu!? Saikyō no Raibaru – Yōko Tamamo" (Japanese: ぬ〜べ〜死す!? 最強の敵[ライバル]·妖狐玉藻)	May 18, 1996
A Kitsune, Yoko Tamamo, tries to kill Hiroshi to get his skull and become human. Nube attempts to save Hiroshi but falls in a dark warehouse and is slashed by Yoko Tamamo.
7	"Demon Hand vs. Flame Ring Tail Technique"; Transliteration: "Oni no Te VS Hiwao no Jutsu" (Japanese: 鬼の手VS火輪尾の術)	May 25, 1996
Nube fights Yoko Tamamo to save Hiroshi, despite his injury and blood loss. If Nube attempted to save Hiroshi, it is Hiroshi who will save and takes care of Nube with loving hug as the latter suffers in injury and blood loss. This is the sequel to episode 6 (ぬ〜べ〜死す!? 最強の敵[ライバル]·妖狐玉藻).
8	"UFO Invasion! Aliens Appear in Warabemori"; Transliteration: "Yufō Shūrai! Uchūjin Dōmori-chō ni Arawaru" (Japanese: UFO襲来! 宇宙人童守町に現る)	June 1, 1996
Shuichi meets Hiroshi, Kyoko, Miki and Katsuya to witness a UFO.
9	"Class 5-3 in Panic! The Busty Rokurokubi"; Transliteration: "Go-nen San-kumi Dai-Panikku! Kyonyū Rokurokubi" (Japanese: 5年3組大パニック! 巨乳ろくろ首)	June 8, 1996
Miki gains the ability to stretch her neck and spy on her friends.
10	"Evil Spirits Run Amok! Hardworking Students Beware"; Transliteration: "Akki Ōabare! Doryoku-suru Ko wa Goyōjin" (Japanese: 悪鬼大暴れ! 努力する子はご用心)	June 15, 1996
Akira is constantly attacked by a demon who ruins his works.
11	"Scoop! Nube Engaged to a Snow Woman!?"; Transliteration: "Sukūpu! Nūbē ga Yukionna to Kon'yaku!?" (Japanese: スクープ! ぬ〜べ〜が雪女と婚約!?)	June 22, 1996
Nube and Yukime meet again after a long time; she tries to freeze him and take him with her to the mountains.
12	"Terrifying Picnic! The Mystery of Kimon Pass"; Transliteration: "Kyōfu no Ensoku! Kimon-Tōge no Nazo" (Japanese: 恐怖の遠足! 鬼門峠の謎)	June 29, 1996
After a picnic, the school bus is attacked by a youkai.
13	"The Classroom Transforms into a Deadly Weapon!? Tamonba's Cursed Sword"; Transliteration: "Kyōshitsu ga Kyōki ni Henshin!? Yōtō Hatamonba no Noroi" (Japanese: 教室が凶器に変身!? 妖刀はたもんばの呪い)	July 13, 1996
Katsuya steals money from a shrine, now the sword from that temple turns into a youkai trying to kill sinful people, including Katsuya.
14	"Two Kyōkos!? Horror of the Doppelgänger"; Transliteration: "Kyōko ga Futari!? Dopperugengā no Kyōfu" (Japanese: 郷子が2人!? ドッペルゲンガーの恐怖)	July 20, 1996
Kyoko's doppelganger flees and Nube must find it before Kyoko dies.
15	"Yukime Returns! The Great Midsummer Freezing Plan"; Transliteration: "Yukime Ritānzu! Manatsu no Reitō Daisakusen" (Japanese: ゆきめリターンズ! 真夏の冷凍大作戦)	August 3, 1996
Yukime returns, but this time, with plans of live as a human, causing problems to Nube, and risking her life at the end trying to save the life of a girl trapped in a fire.
16	"Demon Hand Disabled!! Stranger in the Old School Building"; Transliteration: "Oni no Te Shiyō Funō!! Kyūkōsha no Kaijin" (Japanese: 鬼の手使用不能!! 旧校舎の怪人)	August 10, 1996
In an attempt to save Makoto, Nube ends up possessed by a powerful youkai making impossible for him to use his Oni no te.
17	"Poolside Romance... The Fourth-Course Ghost"; Transliteration: "Pūrusaido no Romansu...Dai-Yon-Kōsu no Yūrei" (Japanese: プールサイドのロマンス...第4コースの幽霊)	August 17, 1996
Kyoko gets swimming lessons from the pool ghost.
18	"Yōko Tamamo Returns! The Giant Fish in the Schoolyard"; Transliteration: "Fukkatsu no Raibaru Tamamo! Kōtei ni Hisomu Kyodai Kaigyo!!" (Japanese: 復活の妖狐[ライバル]·玉藻! 校庭に潜む巨大怪魚!!)	August 31, 1996
A giant fish youkai attacks the school and Nube and Youko Tamamo allies to defeat it.
19	"Slasher Demon! The Strongest Pair's Love Chase!!"; Transliteration: "Renzoku Kirisaki-ma! Saikyō Pea Ai no Dai-Tsuiseki!!" (Japanese: 連続切り裂き魔! 最強ペア愛の大追跡!!)	September 7, 1996
Nube and Yukime pursuit a demon who is killing the love pairs in Doumori.
20	"Time Slip to the Past! Nube's Secret Revealed!!"; Transliteration: "Kako e no Taimu Surippu! Mita zo Nūbē no Himitsu!!" (Japanese: 過去へのタイムスリップ! 見たぞぬ〜べ〜の秘密!!)	September 14, 1996
Nube travels into the past trying to prevent Minako-sensei's death.
21	"Clash with God! I Am the One to Face Judgment!!"; Transliteration: "Kami to no Gekitotsu! Sabaki o Ukeru No wa Ore da!!" (Japanese: 神との激突! 裁きを受けるのは俺だ!!)	October 12, 1996
After Katsuya accidentally kills a fish from God's lake, God's messenger tries to kill him as a punishment.
22	"Someone's Behind You! Terror of the Spirit Photograph!!"; Transliteration: "Kimi no Ushiro ni Dareka Iru! Kyōfu no Shinrei Shashin!!" (Japanese: 君のうしろに誰かいる! 恐怖の心霊写真!!)	October 19, 1996
Portions of a ghost appear in the photos of a trip of the 5-3 students.
23	"Mystery at 0:00:00!? Seven Mysteries: The Mirrors that Face Each Other"; Transliteration: "0 ji 0 hun 0 byō no Kai!? Awase kagami no Nanafushigi" (Japanese: 0時0分0秒の怪!? 合わせ鏡の七不思議)	October 26, 1996
Kyoko and Miki reflect themselves on an opposing mirrors on the school at midnight showing them olders, now each time they reflect themselves they see each time more and more older.
24	"The D-Cup Devil!! Legend of the Love Crow"; Transliteration: "Mashō no D Kappu!! Ai no Karasu Densetsu" (Japanese: 魔性のDカップ!! 愛のカラス伝説)	November 9, 1996
Miki use the love crow legend for spend all her time with Hiroshi, causing Kyoko to get jealous.
25	"Happy Panic! The Zashiki Warashi Who Vanished in Tears"; Transliteration: "Shiawase Panikku! Namida ni Kieta Zashiki-warashi" (Japanese: しあわせパニック! 涙に消えた座敷わらし)	November 16, 1996
26	"The Hair-Raising Second Generation! Mom is a Youkai, Dad is a Teacher!"; Transliteration: "Senritsu no Ni-sei Tanjō! Mama wa Yōkai, Papa wa Sensei!" (Japanese: 戦慄の2世誕生!! ママは妖怪、パパは先生!)	November 30, 1996
Yukime creates a baby that looks like her and Nube and they must stop Yukibe from wreaking havoc in the city.
27	"Dangerous Part-Time Job for a Teen!? Izuna, the Beautiful Girl Who Controls a Sacred Beast"; Transliteration: "Ko gyaru no Kiken na Arubaito!? Reijū o Ayatsuru Bishōjo Izuna" (Japanese: コギャルの危険なアルバイト!? 霊獣を操る美少女いずな)	December 7, 1996
Izuna has kudakitsunes that can perform almost anything. One day, an evil one is born and she needs Nube's help to stop it.
28	"A Very Strange Christmas...The Happiness Kesalan Patharan"; Transliteration: "Yonimo Kimyō na Kurisumasu...Shiawase no Kesaranpasaran" (Japanese: 世にも奇妙なXマス...幸せのケサランパサラン)	December 14, 1996
Miki finds a Kesalan Patharan and decides to breed them for her own use. While at the mall, she must decide whether to use them all to save Nube, Kyoko, Hiroshi, and Makoto from falling to their death.
29	"Youkai All-Stars Appear! The Cursed School Festival!!"; Transliteration: "Yōkai Ōrusutā Sōtōjō! Norowareta Gakuensai!!" (Japanese: 妖怪オールスター総登場! 呪われた学園祭!!)	January 11, 1997
Nube's class creates a haunted house for a school festival, but it gets scorned by a young gang group who always love to cause a lot of trouble to Domori's populace. Nube then decides to bring in the real spirits for their enjoyment.
30	"After-School Horror! The Running Ninomiya Kinjirō Statue!!"; Transliteration: "Hōkago no Kyōfu! Hashiru Ninomiya-Kinjirō-zō!!" (Japanese: 放課後の恐怖! 走る二宮金次郎像!!)	January 18, 1997
Makoto begins to be pursued by the Ninomia Kinjirou statue after he accidentally rips an ancient book.
31	"The Horrifying Eyeball No One Can Speak Of!! Sin of the Genius Violinist"; Transliteration: "Dare ni mo Ienai Medama no Kyōfu!! Tensai Baiorinisuto no Taizai" (Japanese: 誰にも言えない目玉の恐怖!! 天才バイオリニストの大罪)	January 25, 1997
Ai Shinozaki, a great violinist at Doumori begins to have eyeballs appearing on her body because she steals. She must decide to confess or be overtaken by the demon.
32	"And Then, Everyone Disappears! The Red Demon Girl in the Library!!"; Transliteration: "Soshite Dare mo Inakunaru! Toshoshitu no Akai Kai-Shōjo!!" (Japanese: そして誰もいなくなる! 図書室の赤い怪少女!!)	February 1, 1997
A girl's spirit begins attacking the students of 5-3 because of a missing book that used to be her favorite.
33	"Shoukera Appears at the Window! Ritsuko-sensei's Greatest Crisis!!"; Transliteration: "Shōkera ga Mado kara Nozoku! Ritsuko-sensei Saidai no Kiki!!" (Japanese: しょうけらが窓からのぞく! リツコ先生最大の危機!!)	February 8, 1997
Mamoru Kazama, a student of Ritsuko sensei's class is sent to the hospital after he sees a dancing demon on top of his house. Ritsuko sensei feels she must protect him and stays with him in the face of danger.
34	"The Forbidden Past Revealed! The Secret Birth of the Demon's Hand!!"; Transliteration: "Ima Akasareru Kindan no Kako! Oni no Te Tanjō no Himitsu!!" (Japanese: 今明かされる禁断の過去! 鬼の手誕生の秘密!!)	February 15, 1997
One day, Nube's demon hand begins to overtake his body and Tamamo, Hiroshi, and Kyoko must travel to the past to find the solution before Nube becomes an Oni.
35	"Daidarabochi Is My Captive! Miki-chan's Dream Town!!"; Transliteration: "Daidarabotchi wa Watashi no Toriko! Miki-chan no Dorīmu Taun!!" (Japanese: ダイダラボッチは私の虜! 美樹ちゃんのドリームタウン!!)	February 22, 1997
Miki realizes one day that buildings are being moved after she says where she wants them. No one else notices because they are already "accustomed" to the new arrangement. She ends up wishing Domori Elementary away and it's up to her to save the school.
36	"Secret Midnight Lesson! The Music Room's Dangerous Temptation!!"; Transliteration: "Mayonaka no Maruhi Ressun! Ongakushitsu no Kiken na Yūwaku!!" (Japanese: 真夜中の㊙レッスン! 音楽室の危険な誘惑!!)	March 1, 1997
Kyoko bets with Miki that she will learn to play the piano in one week. Kyoko ends up going to secret midnight lessons thinking it's a dream. Her weariness begins to show and it concerns Miki and Nube.
37	"Forgotten for 20 Years!? The Blood-Stained Prophecy Notebook!!"; Transliteration: "Nijū-nen Mae no Wasuremono!? Chi ni Somatta Yogen Nōto!!" (Japanese: 20年前の忘れ物!? 血に染まった予言ノート!!)	March 8, 1997
Makoto stumbles upon a 20-year-old agenda once owned by a student who forgot everything. The student ends up drowning and the spirit comes back to help Makoto. Shortly, the spirit begins to try to kill Makoto and have him discover his body.
38	"What!? First Date with the Rival? Yukime's Long, Hot Day!!"; Transliteration: "E! Raibaru ga Hatsu-Dēto? Yukime no Atsukute Nagai Ichinichi!!" (Japanese: エッ! ライバルが初デート? ゆきめの熱くて長い一日!!)	March 15, 1997
Yukime upsets Zashiki Warashi, so the Zashiki Warashi brings good luck to Nube by having Ritsuko sensei ask Nube on a date and making Yukime jealous.
39	"Revenge from the Depths of Death! Will the Oni and Youko Perform Their Fusion Secret Technique?"; Transliteration: "Shi no Soko kara no Fukushū! Deru ka? Oni to Yōko no Gattai-Ōgi!!" (Japanese: 死の底からの復讐! 出るか? 鬼と妖狐の合体奥義!!)	March 22, 1997
Shuichi's turtle that went down the drain comes back as a monster that Tamamo thinks will be satisfied if Shuichi is sacrificed.
40	"Burning Sailor Uniform! Izuna's Heart Cannot Be Hidden!!"; Transliteration: "Sērā-fuku ga Moechau! Kakushikirenai, Izuna no Hāto!!" (Japanese: セーラー服が燃えちゃう! 隠しきれない、いずなのハート!!)	April 19, 1997
Izuna begins to spontaneously burst into fire at random times. She must relieve her stress that has built up or else she will perish.
41	"I Want to Be Friends...The Terrifying True Form of the Mysterious Classmate!!"; Transliteration: "Tomodachi ni Naritai...Nazo no Dōkyūsei, Senritsu no Shōtai!!" (Japanese: トモダチニナリタイ...謎の同級生、戦慄の正体!!)	April 26, 1997
A model of the human body in a science class inherits a spirit and doesn't realize that he isn't a human being. He wants to become friends with Nube's classmates, but they are terrified of him.
42	"Mommy's a 4-Year-Old!? Past Life Memories Summon a Storm!!"; Transliteration: "Kāchan wa Yon-saiji!? Arashi o Yobu Zense no Kioku!!" (Japanese: 母ちゃんは4歳児!? 嵐を呼ぶ前世の記憶!!)	May 3, 1997
Hiroshi's mother is reincarnated as a 4-year-old school girl to see him, but Hiroshi doesn't believe it. She was reincarnated for Hiroshi to know the situation before she died.
43	"Yukime Dies!! Love Melts Like Snow Crystals..."; Transliteration: "Yukime Shisu!! Ai wa Yuki no Kesshō to Kiete..." (Japanese: ゆきめ死す!! 愛は雪の結晶と消えて...)	May 10, 1997
Yukime is fooled into thinking that taking a human's soul will turn her into a human. Yukime targets Ritsuko sensei because Yukime wants to have a relationship with Nube.
44	"Don't Look, Kids!! Forbidden Ghost Stories: One Hundred Tales"; Transliteration: "Kodomo wa Micha Dame!! Kindan no Kaidan: Hyaku-Monogatari" (Japanese: 子どもは見ちゃダメ!! 禁断の怪談·百物語)	May 17, 1997
A demon takes on the form of Nube and orders every student in the class to tell their scariest stories to aid in opening the portal to the spirit world.
45	"Dream? Illusion? Yukime Returns! Lover, Why Are You Trying to Kill Me!?"; Transliteration: "Yume? Maboroshi? Fukkatsu no Yukime Koibito yo, Naze Ore no Inochi o Nerau!!" (Japanese: 夢? 幻? 復活のゆきめ 恋人よ、なぜ俺の命を狙う!!)	May 31, 1997
46	"Targeted Heroines! Heart-Pounding Bath Panic!!"; Transliteration: "Nerawareta Hiroin-tachi! Dokidoki Ofuro Panikku!!" (Japanese: 狙われたヒロインたち! ドキドキおふろパニック!!)	June 7, 1997
47	"Strongest! Greatest! The Final Enemy! And His Name Is...The God of Poverty!!"; Transliteration: "Saikyō! Saidai! Saigo no Teki Sono Na wa...Binbōgami!!" (Japanese: 最強! 最大! 最後の敵 その名は...貧乏神!!)	June 14, 1997
The God of Poverty targets Nube and makes his money vanish so he becomes poor. What both of them don't realize is that everyone that knows Nube loves and cares for him.
48	"Dreams Are Forever!! Our Beloved Nube!"; Transliteration: "Yume o Itsu made mo!! Daisuki na Bokura no Nūbē!" (Japanese: 夢をいつまでも!! 大好きな僕らのぬ〜べ〜!)	June 21, 1997
Kyoko wakes up one day just to discover that she already becomes a mature woman and her life becomes entirely different than how it should be. She is also shocked by the fact that Hiroshi is already married to Miki. Then she seeks for Nube's help and finds that Nube is in such horrible condition after saving one of his pupil. Kyoko is told that the world she is staying in is a parallel world. Nube then successfully destroys the demon that brings Kyoko to the parallel world.
49	"Perfect Edition!! The Ultimate Jigoku Sensei Nube Encyclopedia"; Transliteration: "「Kanzen Hozon-ban!! Jigoku Sensei Nūbē Chō-Hyakka」" (Japanese: 「完全保存版!! 地獄先生ぬ〜べ〜超百科」)	August 7, 1997
A collection/recap of all the episodes (an encyclopedia of demons, spirits, the story of the Oni no te, the romances, etc.)
OVA–1	"Decisive Battle! Sun God Technique vs Wall Man"; Transliteration: "Jigoku Sensei Nūbē: Kessen! Yōjin no Jutsu VS Kabeo" (Japanese: 地獄先生ぬ〜べ〜 決戦! 陽神の術vs壁男)	September 21, 1998
Nube discovers the culprit is Kabeo (The Wall Man), a spirit that traps humans within solid structures. Because the spirit is elusive and merges with the architecture, Nube is forced to use the Sun God Jutsu (Yōjin no Jutsu) to create a spiritual clone of himself. This allows him to enter the "wall dimension" to engage the spirit in a high-stakes battle and rescue his students before they are permanently absorbed.
OVA–2	"Bukimi-chan: The Mystery of the Seven Mysteries"; Transliteration: "Jigoku Sensei Nūbē: Nazonazo Nana Fushigi – Bukimi-chan" (Japanese: 地獄先生ぬ〜べ〜 なぞなぞ七不思議・ブキミちゃん)	October 21, 1998
When students at Domori Elementary begin encountering Bukimi-chan, they are forced to answer her cryptic questions. If they fail or answer incorrectly, they face a gruesome supernatural fate. The stakes get personal when Nube's students are targeted, forcing him to intervene. Unlike typical spirits he can simply punch with the Demon's Hand, Bukimi-chan's power is tied to the rules of her "game", requiring Nube to use both his spiritual strength and his wits to break her curse and save the children.
OVA–3	"Zekki Strikes! The Greatest Battle Ever!!"; Transliteration: "Shijō saidai no gekisen! Zekki raishū!!" (Japanese: 地獄先生ぬ〜べ〜 史上最大の激戦! 絶鬼来襲!!)	October 21, 1998
The peace of Domori Elementary is shattered by the arrival of Zekki, a powerful and sadistic demon who is the younger brother of Baki (the demon sealed inside Nube's hand). Zekki's goal is to "liberate" his brother by killing Nube and destroying the seal, viewing humans as nothing more than insects. Unlike previous spirits, Zekki is an overwhelming force who easily overpowers Nube in their first encounter. To save his students and the city, Nube is forced to take a desperate gamble: he allows Baki's demonic power to partially consume him to match Zekki's strength. The OVA concludes with a massive battle where the bond between Nube and his students becomes his ultimate weapon, allowing him to regain control of his soul and defeat Zekki, who ultimately acknowledges the warmth of Nube's spirit before his end.

=== 2025–2026 series ===
No.	Title	Directed by (Note: Production staff information is taken from the ending credits of each episode.)	Written by	Storyboarded by	Original release date
Part 1
1	"The 99-Legged Bug"; Transliteration: "Tsukumo no Ashi no Mushi" (Japanese: 九十九の足の蟲)	Yasunori Gotō	Yoshiki Ōkusa	Yasuyuki Ōishi	July 2, 2025 (Note: Episodes 1 and 2 premiered back-to-back.)
In Doumori City a breakdown between Yin and Yang energies has drawn it close to Twilight, part of the dangerous Spirit World. As such, the area is overrun with harmful spirits. Principal of Doumori Elementary protects his students by hiring Japan's only psychic teacher, Meisuke Nueno, aka Nube, to teach class 5-3. Student Hiroshi has a traumatic experience of exorcisms and insists Nube is a liar. Hiroshi later loses his temper and attacks a classmate, losing his place on the football team. His classmate Kyoko worries after seeing a spirit on Hiroshi's shoulder. Hiroshi loses his temper again and attacks Kyoko. Nube shows Hiroshi a Tantrum Worm exorcised from a crying baby and explains such worms cause babies to cry but are usually harmless, but a rare few grow into yokai called 99 Legged Bugs, which he believes is possessing Hiroshi. The Bug causes Hiroshi to attack Nube. Hiroshi recalls hurting his father, who is still in hospital. Nube reveals beneath the glove on his left hand he possesses a powerful oni demon in place of his missing left hand. With the oni and his exorcist powers he removes the Bug from Hiroshi and crushes it. Hiroshi apologises for everything he did. Hiroshi is suddenly attacked by his father's doctor from the hospital, Doctor Tamama.
2	"Rampage of the Fox Demon"; Transliteration: "Yōko Chōryō Bakko" (Japanese: 妖狐・跳梁跋扈)	Fumito Yamada	Yoshiki Ōkusa	Minoru Ōhara	July 2, 2025
Tamama disappears with Hiroshi. Nube tracks them but Tamama uses illusion jutsu to make Nube hallucinate. After breaking the jutsu Nube realises Tamama is leaving spiritual kanji markings in the shape of the Seven Northern Stars constellation, most likely for a ritual. Nube heads to the star location; an amusement park. Tamama stabs Nube in the back and explains he is performing Humanification, a ritual to turn yokai like himself into a more powerful yoko, though the ritual requires Hiroshi's skull. He explains to ensure the skull was free from anger he infected Hiroshi with the Tantrum Worm to absorb his anger and leave the skull purified. Tamama removes his own skull, revealing himself to be a Fox yokai, then begins the ritual. Nube interrupts by activating his demon hand to fight Tamama. Hiroshi and Kyoko switch on a nearby piece of construction equipment that holds a large magnet, stealing Tamama's spear. Nube punches his demon hand through Tamama's chest, who disappears but promises to return. Hiroshi is forced to admit spirits are real and dangerous. Nube explains yokai are more complicated than just "good or evil" so sometimes exorcisms can be less effective than just working out how to have a functional relationship. With Nube's help Hiroshi gets back on the football team and his father finally leaves hospital.
3	"The Midnight Honor Student"; Transliteration: "Mayonaka no Yūtōsei" (Japanese: 真夜中の優等生)	Teru Ishii	Rinrin	Teru Ishii	July 9, 2025 (Note: This episode aired at 11:55 p.m. JST, 10 minutes after the original air time on TV Asahi.)
Nube's students tell him about the Midnight Honour Student; a ghost that does chores at night. Nube investigates with Hiroshi, Kyoka and other students and ends up discovering the Student is a Tsukumogami; the soul of an anatomical doll that developed a personality after years of use and now believes it is a human student. Nube hopes to help it realise what it really is without scaring it. Kyoka suggests pretending they are all in class, so hopefully the Tsukumogami will realise the truth in a safe environment. Instead, the Tsukumogami panics on seeing itself in a mirror and becomes traumatised. Hiroshi offers to be its friend, but the Tsukumogami insists friends should all be equal, so it plans to remove their skin so everyone looks like him. Nube captures the Tsukumogami and as he cannot make it human all he can do is seal the soul back inside the doll. However, the next morning the doll confronts Nube in public, having become a human overnight and planning to find just the right skin to cover up the exposed flesh on its left side. It then disappears before Nube can capture it, with Nube regretting it actually became a dangerous half-yokai.
4	"The Rokurokubi"; Transliteration: "Rokurokubi" (Japanese: ろくろ首)	Kiyoshi Murayama	Hiroko Fukada	Minoru Ōhara	July 16, 2025
Nube invites Ms Ritsuko on a date, but she refuses as the restaurant is next to a cemetery. Nube's student Miki becomes obsessed with gaining psychic powers. After following an online tutorial she falls asleep and has a dream of her neck stretching impossibly far and passing through walls, allowing her to peek on the answers to a maths exam. Ms Ritsuko sees her and ends up traumatised while Miki is scared awake. Nube concludes the school is haunted by the yokai Rokurokubi. Miki is amazed she dreamed the answers to the exam and believes she has gained clairvoyance. That night she stretches her neck to spy on all her classmates at home, planning to impress them. However, everyone accuses her of being the Rokurokubi. Terrified Nube will exorcise her she runs away and ends up fainting in the gym. Asleep, she sees her impossibly long neck reflected in a mirror and tries to fight Nube off, but her friends beg Nube not to exorcise her. Nube explains she isn't a yokai so she doesn't need exorcising. It is not her real neck that is stretching but her spiritual one, a partial ability gained by performing the suspicious tutorial inside the Twilight. Everyone is relieved when he uses his demon hand to easily return Miki to normal.
5	"The Curse of Hatamonba"; Transliteration: "Hata-mon Baba no Noroi" (Japanese: 旗門婆の呪い)	Seiki Takuno	Kenzen	Seiki Takuno	July 23, 2025
Katsuya wants to treat his sister Manami to a crepe but doesn't have the money. He is surprised when the nearby Hatamonba shrine, which contains an evil sword, blesses him with the money. Nube upsets Ritsuko by taking a picture of her with ghosts in the background. Miki takes a class picture of everyone that shows Katsuya without his head. He asks Nube about Hatamonba and learns it was an executioner's sword that became a yokai, dispensing money to people and labelling them thieves if they accept it, cursing them to lose their heads. Manami receives a cut to her neck from a broom, which Katsuya discovers is somehow as sharp as a sword. Everyone returns to the shrine to repay the money, but Hatamonba attacks them. They make it to the school where Nube scolds Katsuya for taking the money, but praises him for trying to return it. Nube is forced to fight Hatamonba but his demon hand is injured. Katsuya uses himself as bait, tricking Hatamonba with his reflection in a mirror and Hatamonba's blade becomes stuck in a desk, allowing Nube to punch him and turn him back into a sword. Nube continues to feel pain in his demon hand. Nube reseals Hatamonba in his shrine, since the previous seal had been damaged by animals.
6	"The Teketeke Ghost"; Transliteration: "Teketeke no Kai" (Japanese: てけてけの怪)	Kiyoshi Murayama	Rinrin	Hiroyuki Kakudō	August 7, 2025 (Note: This episode aired at 12:15 a.m. JST, 30 minutes after the original air time on TV Asahi.)
Kurita watches a video on the Teketeke ghost, a woman cut in half by a train who searches for her missing legs and rips the legs from her victims. Kurita fears she will come for him unless he learns the spell to banish her. Nube upsets Ritsuko by talking about Teketeke in the hallway. Kurita's fear spreads to other students despite Nube assuring him Teketeke is a myth. In reality, he reveals to Hiroshi and Kyoka that Teketeke does exist, but if Kurita continues being afraid of her then his fear might be what summons her. Teketeke attacks Kurita in his home but Nube appears. Kurita begs for the spell that will banish her, but instead Nube links Kurita psychically to Teketeke so he can ask her why she attacks people. He learns the fear of people like Kurita who listened to her ghost story keeps her bound to the earth; as long as they fear her, she cannot rest. At Nube's direction, Kurita promises Teketeke not to be afraid of her and prays she finds peace. Teketeke disappears after Nube promises to put her to rest properly when no one remembers her anymore. Later, Teketeke visits Mr Horrific, the online influencer who made the video about her, and murders him on camera.
7	"The Unseasonable Yuki-Onna"; Transliteration: "Kisetsuhazure no Yuki On'na" (Japanese: 季節外れの雪女)	Fumiaki Usui	Hiroko Fukada	Toshihiko Masuda	August 14, 2025
Snow begins falling out of season. Nube is irritated when Miki uses fortune telling to predict he has zero romantic compatibility with Ritsuko. A woman named Yukime visits, claiming to be Nube's fiancée. Nube vaguely remembers meeting her at a ski resort years ago, with Yukime revealing she is a Yuki-onna. As the snow won't stop unless she goes home Nube tries to deter her from staying by taking her to hot places, but she uses her powers to freeze everything. The snow begins to inconvenience the whole city. Nube recalls meeting Yukime when she was a young Yukinko and saving her from a local demon hunter. After healing her, she decided she would marry Nube once she was old enough. Nube realises this means freezing him solid so she can marry him and tries to run, but she catches him. Before she can freeze him Hiroshi and the others distract her with snowballs. Nube manages to stop her killing them and threatens to exorcise her. Yukime agrees to return to the mountains and wait for him to love her back, then steals a kiss from him. The students are shocked to discover this has frozen Nube's head, so they rush to defrost him before it is too late.
8	"The Great Inventions and the Translator of the Spiritual World"; Transliteration: "Idaina hatsumei to Seishin Sekai no Hon'yaku-sha" (Japanese: 偉大な発明と精神世界の翻訳者)	Tetsuaki Mita	Kenzen	Minoru Ōhara	August 20, 2025
Akira enjoys building gadgets and while searching for parts he finds a sinister looking tablet computer. The next day he invents a device to talk to class rabbit Shiro. Nube senses something about Akira's inventions. Akira builds a device that can find ghosts faster than Nube. Akira's friends worry his personality is changing. It is shown the blueprints for his latest inventions all came from the tablet, which talks to him in secret. Shiro dies and the tablet compels Akira to build a Soul Restoration machine. The machine captures Shiro's soul for everyone to interact with, but the machine attacks the students to drain their life force as a power source. Nube destroys the machine, freeing Shiro's soul to heaven. The tablet reveals it contains souls of past inventors who resented that death would stop them inventing, so they found ways of extending their lives and harnessing spirit energy. Now, they search for young inventors to add to their collection. Akira insists their machines are harmful, whereas he wants to help people. The souls decide Akira is unsuitable and leave to find another young inventor, after which the tablet stops working. Akira apologises to his friends and returns to inventing, though his next malfunctioning machine cases Nube to lose his wallet.
9	"The Girl Who Brings Happiness"; Transliteration: "Shiawase o Motarasu Shōjo" (Japanese: 幸せをもたらす少女)	Teru Ishii	Hiroko Fukada	Teru Ishii	August 27, 2025 (Note: This episode aired at 11:51 p.m. JST, 6 minutes after the original air time on TV Asahi.)
Nube encounters a Zashiki-warashi, a spirit that brings happiness to humans, so he gives her a snack and lets her go. She moves into his classroom where his students start getting perfect exam scores. He realises to make them happy, Zashiki-warashi has increased their luck. He later realises things have gone too far when Ritsuko asks him on a date, since if humans are artificially happy all the time, they stop putting in any effort at all. He kindly asks Zashiki-warashi to find a home where she is needed, but she runs away upset. Everyone follows her to the home of an elderly woman who owns a photograph of Zashiki-warashi. She explains she is over 100 years old and the photograph is her daughter Haruko who died of starvation during the war. Nube realises Haruko was such a caring person she gained Zashiki-warashi abilities after death, dooming herself to always be invisible and alone. Makoto decides they should make Haruko happy, so Nube casts spells to return Haruko's human memories and to let her mother see her. After an emotional reunion and goodbye Haruko moves on to another home. Nube regrets as a yokai Haruko will never be able to rest peacefully in heaven with her mother.
10	"The Night Parade of the Yokai"; Transliteration: "Yōkai no Yakō" (Japanese: 妖怪の夜行)	Kiyoshi Murayama	Rinrin	Tetsuya Watanabe	September 3, 2025
Rich snob Shuichi resents having to attend the school's yearly flea market where students sell things they don't need, since his father is so wealthy he buys anything he wants brand new. Ritsuko is proud of the market as it teaches students to value their belongings. Shuichi carelessly sells his belongings cheaply as his parents have already bought expensive replacements. Rain cancels the market so Shuichi borrows an old umbrella. The umbrella reminds Shuichi of his childhood. The umbrella turns out to be a yokai that kidnaps Shuichi to a junk yard filled with similar yokai. Nube recognises them as the Tsukumogami Night Parade. Legend says items people treasure can sometimes become yokai. Nube psychically links Shuichi to the umbrella, which turns out to be the umbrella Shuichi's mother bought him for pre-school. He loved the umbrella enough that it gained its own soul, but unfortunately he lost it and never saw it again. During the Night Parade these yokai visit their former owners to thank them for loving them so much. The next morning they awake in the junk yard with the yokai returned to inanimate objects waiting to be destroyed or recycled. Nube explains all possessions are discarded one day, so it is important to love them as long as you can. Shuichi says goodbye to the broken umbrella, having learned a valuable lesson.
11	"Demon Hand Vs. Firetail Jutsu"; Transliteration: "Oni no Te Vs. Hiwao no Jutsu" (Japanese: 鬼の手 VS. 火輪尾の術)	Seiki Takuno	Yoshiki Ōkusa	Toshihiko Masuda	September 10, 2025
Fox yokai Tsuwabukimaru locates the discarded skull of her master Tamama and restores him. Tamama is angry to be alive again but decides to use the opportunity for revenge on Nube. Resuming his role as a doctor he infiltrates the school during health check week but assures Nube he is no longer interested in Hiroshi. Instead, he starts learning as much about Nube as he can from the students and is surprised in their opinion he is an average teacher, rather weird and unreliable, except for when he saves them with his demon left hand and becomes super reliable. Meanwhile, a dog infected after an encounter with a yokai, dies at the school gate, releasing the yokai infecting it. Tamama attacks the students, hoping to draw out the power Nube used to defeat him, so he can understand it. Nube defeats him again, making Tamama determined to gain Nube's power for himself. The other yokai attacks the school and is revealed as Remugyo, a fish yokai that swims through a fog made of spirit energy. It begins infecting the students with eggs to hatch thousands of offspring. Nube tries to kill it but it recovers quickly inside the fog with Tamama explaining the harder Nube fights the more energy Remugyo will absorb from him.
12	"Spirit Beast Vs. Spirit Fish"; Transliteration: "Reijū・Reimugyo" (Japanese: 霊獣・霊霧魚)	Miichiro Kamenosono	Yoshiki Ōkusa	Hiroaki Takagi	September 17, 2025
Nube restrains Remugyo, allowing students infected with eggs to be taken to the roof above the fog layer. Nube cannot remove the eggs without permanently damaging the students' souls. Tamama reveals the eggs will hatch at sunset, killing the students. Seeing Nube's frustration he reveals since the fog makes Remugyo immortal he needs to get Remugyo into direct sunlight. Nube infuses nets from the gym with spirit energy. Hiroshi demands Tamama help Nube, since if even one student dies Nube's spirit will be permanently broken, he will never be able to use his powers again and Tamama will never learn their secret. With the students all begging him, Tamama disappears. With Remugyo sleeping Nube begins setting up nets beneath it, but it awakens and attacks him. Tamama reappears and burns away the fog with Fire Jutsu while Nube lifts Remugyo into the sunlight, removing its immortality so he can destroy it. The eggs also vanish just as the sun sets. Tamama considers himself a disgraced yoko for saving humans but Nube reveals it is humans that give him his power; the gratitude and love he gets from his students. The students swarm Tamama to thank him, who remains just as confused as before.
13	"The Human Faced Tumor"; Transliteration: "Jinmenken" (Japanese: 人面疽)	Fumito Yamada	Kenzen	Hiroyuki Kakudō	September 24, 2025
Nube goes absent with a serious illness, worrying the students as Nube would never willingly miss the free school lunch. Katsuya's sister Manami sees a terrifying creature in a disused school building. As Nube is not there Miki, Hiroshi, Kyoka, Kurita and Katsuya decide to investigate instead and when they sneak inside they find Nube covered in growths with faces on them. Nube explains he messed up an exorcism and is now possessed by the demon Jinmenso, aka the Human Faced Tumour. He needs to use his demon hand to remove it, but Jinmenso has paralysed his left arm. The students decide they need a tool that can cut spirits, so Katsuya makes the risky decision to borrow Hatamonba's sword. Despite the risk, Nube astral projects his soul out of his body but Hatamonba transforms into a yokai again before Katsuya can cut Jinmenso off. As Hatamonba cannot sense any thieves it tries to leave, so Hiroshi steals Nube's wallet. Miki uses her neck stretching ability to restrain Jinmenso and while chasing Hiroshi Hatamonba accidentally cuts off Jinmenso's head. Nube quickly destroys Jinmenso and punches Hatamonba, turning it back into a sword, so everyone celebrates. A lightning storm appears, making Nube, Tamama and all the yokai in the city nervous.
Part 2
14	"The Pillow-Flipping Dimensional Yokai"; Transliteration: "Jigen Yōkai・Makuragaeshi" (Japanese: 次元妖怪・まくらがえし)	Tetsuaki Mita	Rinrin	Hayato Date	January 7, 2026
Kyoko awakens as a 26 year old woman but experiences memory confusion as she has adult memories but is certain she was 11 years old only yesterday. Walking around town she learns her other classmates all grew up and got jobs. She visits Miki, now a mother of triplets, and explains about her memory. Kyoko suddenly remembers she dated Hiroshi until high school, but he is now married to Miki. Miki suddenly reveals Kyoko is not from this world and urges her to go and see Nube. She finds him as a disabled patient in hospital with Ritsuko caring for him. She learns 15 years ago Nube fought a white tiger yokai to protect the students, but was left disabled. She becomes certain the last time she was 11 was the same day they defeated Jinmenso. With great effort Nube recites an exorcism and suddenly grabs an invisible yokai sitting on Kyoko's shoulder; a Pillow-turner, which swapped her 11 year old soul with her 26 year old soul from the future. As she does not belong in this version of the future, Nube urges her to go back and find the future that is hers, then forces the Pillow-turner to send her home. Kyoko awakens as an 11 year old and makes sure to thank Nube for everything he does for them.
15	"The Exorcist Who Leapt Through Time"; Transliteration: "Toki wo Kakeru Nube" (Japanese: 時をかけるぬ〜べ〜)	Seiki Takuno	Yoshiki Ōkusa	Toshihiko Masuda	January 14, 2026 (Note: This episode aired at 12:10 a.m. JST, 25 minutes after the regular air time on TV Asahi.)
16	"The Yuki-onna Returns"; Transliteration: "Yuki-onna Futatabi" (Japanese: 雪女ふたたび)	Kiyoshi Murayama	Hiroko Fukada	Tetsuya Watanabe	January 21, 2026
17	""A" is Here!"; Transliteration: ""A" ga Kita!" (Japanese: 「A」がきた!)	Shinichi Fukumoto	Rinrin	Masaharu Okuwaki	January 28, 2026
18	"The Earth-Shifting Daidara-bocchi!"; Transliteration: "Daidarabotchi" (Japanese: ダイダラボッチ)	Teru Ishii	Kenzen	Teru Ishii	February 4, 2026
19	"The Divine Beast: Kirin"; Transliteration: "Shinjū · Kirin" (Japanese: 神獣・麒麟)	Kiyoshi Murayama	Kenzen	Masaharu Okuwaki	February 12, 2026
20	"The Yuki-onna on the Beach"; Transliteration: "Hamabe no Yuki-onna" (Japanese: 浜辺の雪女)	Shinichi Fukumoto	Hiroko Fukada	Aimi Yamauchi	February 18, 2026
21	"The Yokai Shoukera Peeks Through the Window"; Transliteration: "Yōkai Shōkera ga Mado kara Nozoku" (Japanese: 妖怪しょうけらが窓から覗く)	Kiyoshi Murayama & Mitsuo Hashimoto	Rinrin	Hayato Date	February 25, 2026
22	"The Seven Misaki"; Transliteration: "Shichinin Misaki" (Japanese: 七人ミサキ)	Fumito Yamada	Kenzen	Toshihiko Masuda	March 4, 2026
23	"Requiem for a Promise"; Transliteration: "Yakusoku no Rekuiemu" (Japanese: 約束のレクイエム)	Fumito Yamada	Seiki Takuno	Seiki Takuno	March 11, 2026
24	"Miss Mary"; Transliteration: "Merī-san" (Japanese: メリーさん)	Shinichi Fukumoto	Hiroko Fukada	Teru Ishii	March 18, 2026
25	"The Secret of the Demon Hand (Part 1)"; Transliteration: "Oni no te no Himitsu (Zenpen)" (Japanese: 鬼の手の秘密 （前編）)	Tetsuaki Mita	Yoshiki Ōsuka	Tetsuaki Mita	March 25, 2026
26	"The Secret of the Demon Hand (Part 2)"; Transliteration: "Oni no te no Himitsu (Kōhen)" (Japanese: 鬼の手の秘密 （後編）)	Fumito Yamada, Shinichi Fukumoto & Mitsuo Hashimoto	Yoshiki Ōsuka	Hayato Date	March 25, 2026
