= Pelezinho (TV series) =

- Genre: Children's television series
- Country of origin: Spain
- Original language: Spanish
- No. of seasons: 1
- No. of episodes: 52

Production
- Running time: 22 minutes
- Production companies: Anima Dream and Worldwide Cartoons

Original release
- Network: Antena 3

Pelezinho is a Spanish animated cartoon series co-produced in 1996 by Antena 3, Anima Dream, Worldwide Cartoons, Anima Dream, Worldwide Cartoons. The series is based on the popular Brazilian footballer Pelé as a child, having the same concept as the 1977 comic book of the same name, although having no relation to it.

The cartoon was aired in Brazil in 1998 by the children's TV show Angel Mix on Rede Globo.

== Plot ==
The show focuses on the fictional adventures of Pelé as a 12-year-old boy who was born in the Brazilian favelas, in addition to playing on the national team's football team, also travels the world having adventures facing villains with his best friend Neusa and his pet dog Rex.
