= Stickin' Around =

Canadian animated television series

- Genre: Slapstick; Comedy
- Created by: Robin Steele; Brianne Leary
- Developed by: Robin Steele; Brianne Leary
- Starring: Ashley Taylor (Tickell); Ashley Brown; Daniel Goodfellow; Andrew Craig; Marianna Galati; Nicholas Rice; Philip Williams; Catherine Disher; Melleny Melody; Allegra Fulton; Benedict Campbell; Ron Rubin; Leah Cudmore; Lisa Yamanaka
- Opening theme: "Stickin' Around Theme Song" performed by Ashley Taylor (Tickell)
- Ending theme: "Stickin' Around Theme Song" (instrumental)
- Composer: John Tucker
- Country of origin: Canada
- Original language: English
- No. of seasons: 3
- No. of episodes: 39 (77 segments) (list of episodes)

Production
- Executive producers: Michael Hirsh; Patrick Loubert; Clive A. Smith; Gerard Mital; For YTV: Michelle McCree; Alan Gregg
- Running time: 22 minutes (11 minutes per segment)
- Production company: Nelvana

Original release
- Network: YTV
- Release: August 14, 1996 – April 12, 1998

Stickin' Around is a Canadian animated children's television series co-produced by Nelvana and created and developed by Robin Steele and Brianne Leary which originated as a series of one-minute interstitials on the US network CBS in 1994. In Canada, the regular series originally aired on YTV from August 14, 1996, until April 12, 1998. The series ran for three seasons for two years.

According to Nelvana, it uses "the advanced computer graphics of 'Boiler Paint', virtually convincing us that kids are creating their own animated series."

== Overview ==
The series focuses on two gradeschool-aged, stick-figure best friends named Stacy and Bradley; their hand-drawn adventures with their friends and family; along their fantasies, both encountering many problems they must face as they continue to grow up – with school, bullies, friends, along their parents – and always coming up with imaginative ideas to eliminate these obstacles, such as becoming a superhero and putting themselves in a different environment where they have no trouble in defeating their enemies.

== Episodes ==
Season	Episodes	Originally released	
Season	Episodes	First released	Last released
1	13	August 14, 1996	December 9, 1996
2	13	January 20, 1997	December 8, 1997
3	13	January 19, 1998	April 13, 1998

== Characters ==
- Stacy Stickler: (voiced by Ashley Taylor Tickell, Andrew Craig in the interstitials) One of the main protagonists. An 8-year-old (later 9) quiet-but-bossy and sarcastic girl dressed in orange who liked to imagine many things with Bradley. She often says "For your big fat information" and her catchphrase "Real mature, Bradley". She sometimes serves as the voice of reason for Bradley's silliness and carelessness. In the interstitials, she shared the same voice actor with Lance before Ashley took over her role.
- Bradley: (voiced by Ashley Brown) The other main protagonist is Stacy's 9-year-old (later 10) best friend. He is African-Canadian and wears thick black-framed glasses along a red backwards cap. He often imagines himself as a superhero, secret agent, robot, or a vampire, namely as "Rubber Guy", "Cap Crusader"," 00 Bradley", "Robo Bradley", or "Count Vladley". His favourite fantasy is "Aliens from Uranus" are behind whatever problem they are facing, much to Stacy's annoyance.
- Frank: Stacy's obese pet Dachshund dog who sometimes shares in their adventures and liked to eat something different. Due to his insatiable appetite, he often sees things as food. He is very lazy and does not exercise much apart from chasing Stacy on the way to school. He is named after a term of meat.
- Lester: Bradley's pet chameleon who mixes into the background and causes a lot of trouble.
- Lance: (voiced by Andrew Craig) An evil bully who loves to pick on everyone in school, especially Bradley, whom he nicknames "Scradley".
- Russell: (voiced by Amos Crawley) Lance's dimwitted best friend and sidekick (minion of Stacy and Bradley) and carries around with him a horrible odour. He always says "What?" when everyone says "Whoa Man! What's that funky smell?" and he repeats everything that Lance says. He actually says "Yeah... [either what Lance said, or a synonym/variant]". He does surprisingly well in the classroom.
- Polly: (voiced by Marianna Galati) Lance's friendly, intelligent younger half-sister who always gives words of knowledge and wisdom. She is often seen walking her lifeless pet poodle, Pepperoni, whom she refuses to believe is dead; she dislikes being called a baby, though.
- Pepperoni: Pepperoni, as mentioned above, is Polly's lifeless pet dog. Polly is normally seen dragging Pepperoni around by his leash. He is named after an Italian meat topping.
- Dill: (voiced by Daniel Goodfellow) Loudest friend of Stacy and Bradley who has an ear-splitting voice. Often, uses the words "HOLY MACKEREL!".
- Stella Stickler: (voiced by Catherine Disher) Stacy's caring but also hot-headed mother. She loves fashion, she works hard, and dislikes being annoyed by Stacy and Bradley sometimes. She is divorced from her husband Stanley. She is very annoyed when Stanley is trying to "fix" things.
- Stanley Stickler: (voiced by Philip Williams) Stacy's ambitious father. His inventions go wrong and he is bad at cooking. A running gag is that he's always trying to fix appliances. He is divorced from his wife Stella. As mentioned in the first episode entitled "Aaand Action!", he lives in "his own place" in the same apt building (located at Latchkey Gardens). He also seems to be kind of forgetful, because in the episode "Madam Know-It-All" it's a running gag that he thinks that his family has a lawn, but it's green gravel. He still doesn't seem to get that this "lawn" is never made out of grass because in the episode "We're Doomed" from the third (and final) season, he still thinks that it is grass; and on the episode "It's My Parties" from the second season, in which he didn't realize it was Stella's turn to throw a surprise birthday party for Stacy.
- Ms. Mobley: (voiced by Melleny Brown) Stacy and Bradley's cheerful-but-crazy teacher. She frequently says "Won't that be fun?" to one of them.
- Principal Coffin: (voiced by Benedict Campbell) A creepy school principal who looks like a hybrid between a zombie and a vampire. He speaks in a slow, spooky accent.
- Mr. Lederhosen: (voiced by Ron Rubin) The class' tough, European gym teacher who acts like a military sergeant major.
- Mr. Doddler: (voiced by Nicholas Rice, unknown in the interstitials) A senior citizen who wears a fez with a crescent moon on it. He is a farmer who often grows the ingredients to make the kids' favourite snack, Cheez Poopers, that are similar to Wotsits. Stacy usually calls him "Mr. D".
- William: (voiced by Daniel DeSanto) A chubby boy who liked eating.
- Melody: (voiced by Leah Renee Cudmore) Stacy and Bradley's disabled classmate who uses a wheelchair. She occasionally teams up with Stacy against Bradley and Dill.
- Ashley: (voiced by Lisa Yamanaka) Stacy's rival and the wealthiest girl in school. She always wears a beret and is normally seen acting as somewhat of a snob and a spoiled brat.
- Mrs. Salazar: (voiced by Allegra Fulton) A Hispanic woman who is Stacy and Bradley's kind-hearted neighbour.
- Pickle: Dill's pet parrot. His name is a pun on a dill pickle (a food).
- Scooter: William's pet hamster.
- Freddy: Melody's pet maggot.

== Production and reception ==
The series was executive produced by Michael Hirsh, Patrick Loubert, Gerard Mital and Clive A. Smith, supervising produced by Vince Commisso and Stephen Hodgins, and coordinating produced by Patricia R. Burns. Laura Kate Wallis, Marianne Culbert and Tom McGillis served as producers, with the series being directed by John Halfpenny, John Van Bruggen and Chad Hicks. Dale Schott and Hugh Duffy served as story editors and Michelle McCree and Alan Gregg served as YTV's executive producers. Dan Hennessey and Merle Anne Ridley served as voice directors and Karyn Bonello-Tester served as a casting administrator.

Stickin' Around won the Gemini Award for "Best Animated Program or Series" in Spring 1998, while being nominated once again during the Autumn 1998, for the Gemini of the same award.

== Telecast and home media ==
In 1994, the series originated as a set of one-minute interstitials on CBS in the U.S. The series originally aired from 1996 until 1998 on YTV and Quebecois Teletoon in Canada and on ABC in Australia, with repeats airing prominently on YTV until 2004 and again from 2006 until 2008. In Australia, it also aired on Disney Channel from 2002 to 2004. In Latin America & Brazil, it aired on Nickelodeon under the title Los Grafitos, which translates to "The Graphites" in Spanish, and as Os Rabiscos Ariscos, or "The Skittish Doodles" in Portuguese, also on Nickelodeon. In the UK, it aired on Nickelodeon in 1996 and Channel 4 in 2004; and also on Disney Channel in Japan and on TVNZ 2 in New Zealand. It aired in the U.S. on Fox Kids from 1997 until 1998, on Fox Family Channel from 1998 until 2000 (packaged as part of The Three Friends and... Jerry Show), and on Nickelodeon for a short time in 2000, it would also later air in repeats on Ion's now-defunct, 24/7 Qubo from March 28, 2016 until July 24, 2020. It also aired on the Spanish-language Telefutura (currently UniMas), as part of the Toonturama block, from July until November 2002.

In North America, the series ever released on VHS by Cinepix/Lionsgate in the late 1990s, but not on DVD years later.

In Australia, the series ever released on VHS by Village Roadshow and later on DVD by MRA.

As of 2022, the entirety of Stickin' Around is available to stream on FilmRise and also on Tubi.
