= List of KaBlam! episodes =

This is a complete listing of episodes from the Nickelodeon animated television series KaBlam!

The titles for all episodes of these series are named after the ads on the back cover of the "comic book", which closes at the end of each episode.

== Series overview ==
Season	Episodes	Originally released	
Season	Episodes	First released	Last released
1	13	October 11, 1996	January 31, 1997
2	13	September 26, 1997	January 16, 1998
3	11	September 4, 1998	March 12, 1999
4	11	December 31, 1999	May 27, 2000

== Episodes ==
=== Season 1 (1996–97) ===
No. overall	No. in season	Title	Directed by	Written by	Original release date	Households (in millions)
1	1	"Your Real Best Friend"	Mark Marek (Henry & June); Frank Gresham (Sniz & Fondue); Mark Osborne (Action League Now!); Stephen Holman (Life with Loopy); Cote Zellers (Prometheus & Bob)	Robert Mittenthal & Will McRobb & Chris Viscardi & Rick Groel (Henry & June); Michael Pearlstein (Sniz & Fondue); Tim Hill (Action League Now!); Stephen Holman & Clam Lynch (Life with Loopy); Cote Zellers (Prometheus & Bob)	October 11, 1996	
Henry and June explain how KaBlam! is different from other comic books.; In Sniz & Fondue, Fondue buys a scorpion to keep Sniz out of his room, but the scorpion escapes.; Henry gets webbed by a black widow spider.; In Action League Now!, the League must stop the Mayor from littering.; Henry explains what chuckimation is.; In Life with Loopy, Loopy literally makes a new friend, who is great at first...; Henry and June stuff their heads with melon.; In Prometheus and Bob, Prometheus tries to teach Bob art and bowling.; Henry and June say the Pledge of KaBlam!-legiance.
2	2	"It's Flavorific!"	Mark Marek (Henry & June); Frank Gresham (Sniz & Fondue); Tim Hill (Action League Now!); Cote Zellers (Prometheus & Bob); Stephen Holman (Life with Loopy)	Robert Mittenthal & Will McRobb & Chris Viscardi (Henry & June); Michael Pearlstein (Sniz & Fondue); Tim Hill (Action League Now!); Cote Zellers (Prometheus & Bob); Stephen Holman & Clam Lynch (Life with Loopy)	October 18, 1996	
Henry and June read fan mail, which tells them to go away.; In Sniz and Fondue, Sniz starts to do dangerous motorcycle stunts, in the end, he ends up in the hospital, but still excited about his past stunts.; June races a chair and apparently wins.; In Action League Now!, the Mayor kidnaps two kids and Thunder Girl is the only one who can save them, too bad she lost her ability to fly.; June thinks up of a cool superhero, which Henry laughs at.; In Prometheus and Bob, Prometheus tries to teach Bob how to clothe and move a wheel.; Henry and June try on different helmets, but June makes a mistake choosing a piano.; In Life with Loopy, Loopy tries to stop her dad's bills coming in the mail, and she fails but sends her dad a heartwarming letter in the mail.; Henry tricks June into turning the last page, and afterwards, she beats him up.
3	3	"Comics for Tomorrow Today"	Mark Marek (Henry & June); Frank Gresham (Sniz & Fondue); Reginald Groff III & Howard Hoffman (Action League Now!); Cote Zellers (Prometheus & Bob); Federico Vitali (Lava); Stephen Holman (Life with Loopy)	Robert Mittenthal & Will McRobb & Chris Viscardi & Anne Bernstein (Henry & June); Uncredited (Sniz & Fondue); Robert Mittenthal & Will McRobb & Chris Viscardi and Magda Liolis (Action League Now!); Cote Zellers (Prometheus & Bob); Federico Vitali (Lava); Stephen Holman & Clam Lynch (Life with Loopy)	October 25, 1996	
June demonstrates her "super-powers", which is touching her tongue with her nose and turning her eyelids inside out.; In Sniz and Fondue, Sniz accidentally goes bald while using a new hair product, and after all of the treatments fail, Fondue shaves his head and goes bald to cheer Sniz up.; June shows that she has actual super-powers, telekinesis, as she lifts Henry with it.; In Action League Now!, the League accidentally releases "Spot-Zilla", that eats Stinky Diver. (This episode ends on a cliffhanger and continues in Not Just for People Anymore).; June worries about how the ending to Action League Now! won't be until the next show.; In Prometheus and Bob, Prometheus tries to teach Bob how to play music.; Henry tries to prove he has a super-power to open a bag of potato sticks, but fails.; In Life with Loopy, Loopy turns into an egg and a chicken comes to take her. After she burps, the chicken leaves and Loopy turns back to normal.; With the encouragement from June, Henry finally sees his power, the power to turn the page.; Only KaBlam! episode with a cliffhanger.
4	4	"Not Just for People Anymore"	Mark Marek (Henry & June); Frank Gresham (Sniz & Fondue); Reginald Groff III & Howard Hoffman (Action League Now!); Cote Zellers (Prometheus & Bob); Federico Vitali (Lava); Stephen Holman (Life with Loopy)	Robert Mittenthal & Will McRobb & Chris Viscardi & Anne Bernstein (Henry & June); Uncredited (Sniz & Fondue); Robert Mittenthal & Will McRobb & Chris Viscardi and Magda Liolis (Action League Now!); Cote Zellers (Prometheus & Bob); Federico Vitali (Lava); Stephen Holman & Clam Lynch (Life with Loopy)	November 1, 1996	
June tries to do a report outside Sniz and Fondue's house, but loses the directions.; Sniz and Fondue: Fashionably Fondue: Fondue wants to be a fashion designer.; June shoots Henry with a laser.; In Action League Now!, the episode continues where it started in the episode Comics for Tomorrow Today; Henry and June are happy about the ending to Action League Now.; In Prometheus and Bob, Bob tries to fish.; Surprising Shorts: In Lava, two snails show off for each other.; June throws a party after she has to stay on her side of the panel.; Life with Loopy: Goop on the Loose.; Henry joins in on June's party.
5	5	"All Purpose KaBlam!"	Mark Marek (Henry & June); Frank Gresham (Sniz & Fondue); Tim Hill (Action League Now!); Cote Zellers (Prometheus & Bob); Federico Vitali (Lava); Stephen Holman (Life with Loopy)	Robert Mittenthal & Will McRobb & Chris Viscardi & Vince Calandra (Henry & June); Michael Pearlstein (Sniz & Fondue); Tim Hill (Action League Now!); Cote Zellers (Prometheus & Bob); Federico Vitali (Lava); Stephen Holman & Clam Lynch (Life with Loopy)	November 15, 1996	
The episode starts out with June finishing an automatic page turner, much to Henry's dismay.; They turn the page to Sniz and Fondue where Sniz is taught a "timely" lesson after he annoys his roommates.; Henry and June then are shown running but get caught by a man playing drums.; In Action League Now!, Meltman gets amnesia and the Action league have to regain his memories.; Believing he has amnesia too, June drops a tank on Henry, but he defends himself.; They turn the page to Prometheus and Bob where Prometheus tries to teach Bob to cross a bridge.; Surprising Shorts: In Lava, an animal sets off for galaxies unknown.; Henry and June introduce Life with Loopy where Loopy's hygiene attracts attention.; Henry and June then close the show with Henry winning a golf tournament at the Grand Canyon.
6	6	"What the Astronauts Drink"	Mark Marek (Henry & June); Frank Gresham (Sniz & Fondue); Mark Osborne (Action League Now!); Stephen Holman (Life with Loopy); Robert Scull (Anemia & Iodine)	Robert Mittenthal & Will McRobb & Chris Viscardi & Madga Liolis (Henry & June); Michael Pearlstein (Sniz & Fondue); Chris Viscardi & Tim Hill & Robert Mittenthal & Will McRobb (Action League Now!); Stephen Holman & Clam Lynch (Life with Loopy); Robert Scull & Krystine Kryttre (Anemia & Iodine)	November 22, 1996	
Henry and June plan a field trip to space.; In Sniz and Fondue, Sniz goes up to space with aliens, but after his annoyance, he is released back to his home.; Henry forgets the key to start the rocket.; In Action League Now!, the League must rescue Justice who is trapped in a rocket getting ready to go to space.; June accidentally goes to the bathroom in her pants.; In Life with Loopy, Loopy lassos the moon and finds an astronaut who was stranded by his friends, he gets off the moon and Loopy sends it back up in the sky.; Henry and June introduce Surprising Shorts in where two girls, Anemia and Iodine, try to find a cat, who is a ghost, in a haunted house.; Henry and June finally start the rocket and blast off.
7	7	"KaBlam! Gets Results"	Mark Marek (Henry & June); Frank Gresham (Sniz & Fondue); Mark Osborne (Action League Now!); Stephen Holman (Life with Loopy); Cote Zellers (Prometheus & Bob); Federico Vitali (Lava)	Uncredited (Henry & June); Michael Pearlstein (Sniz & Fondue); Tim Hill (Action League Now!); Stephen Holman & Clam Lynch (Life with Loopy); Cote Zellers (Prometheus & Bob); Federico Vitali (Lava)	December 6, 1996	
June tries to learn self-defense, but she is scared away by Henry's cloak.; In Sniz and Fondue, Fondue tries to avoid germs.; June blows a huge bubble-gum bubble.; In Action League Now!, the League must figure out which Flesh is the real one, since a robot Flesh appears.; June gets a robot that shrinks Henry.; In Life with Loopy, Loopy searches for goldfish heaven.; Henry introduces Prometheus and Bob, where Prometheus tries to teach Bob how to use a shelter.; Henry announces Surprising Shorts. June pulls Henry's trousers to reveal he's wearing shorts with Richard Nixon on them.; Surprising Shorts: In Lava, a small dog tries to awaken his pal and gets a surprise.; Henry and June do a wacky handshake.; This episode includes the Life with Loopy pilot.
8	8	"You've Tried the Rest! Now Try the Best!"	Mark Marek (Henry & June); Frank Gresham (Sniz & Fondue); Tim Hill (Action League Now!); Stephen Holman (Life with Loopy); Mo Willems (The Off-Beats)	Robert Mittenthal & Will McRobb & Chris Viscardi (Henry & June); Michael Pearlstein (Sniz & Fondue); Tim Hill (Action League Now!); Stephen Holman & Clam Lynch (Life with Loopy); Mo Willems & Josh Selig (The Off-Beats)	December 13, 1996	
Henry is annoyed with June because she has the giggles, so he throws her down a volcano, but his plan doesn't work.; In Sniz and Fondue, Sniz and Fondue borrow money from loan sharks and soon regret it, though they work everything out.; June returns the things she "borrowed" from Henry, including "his" irregularly shaped boulder collection.; In Action League Now!, the Mayor uses a vacuum to suck up the Action League, with Meltman the only one not sucked up, he surprisingly saves everyone.; Henry and June make tapioca pudding.; In Life with Loopy, Loopy faces Mother Nature in a bowling competition.; Henry and June introduce The Off-Beats, where August buys Robo-Dog, a robot dog who plays forever, but August soon get terribly annoyed with it.; June erases everything on the set, including Henry's head and herself.
9	9	"Episode 9"	Mark Marek (Henry & June); Regenald Groff III & Howard Hoffman (Action League Now!); Frank Gresham (Sniz & Fondue); Stephen Holman & Clam Lynch (Life with Loopy); Sue Rose (Angela Anaconda)	Robert Mittenthal & Will McRobb & Chris Viscardi (Henry & June); Robert Mittenthal & Will McRobb & Chris Viscardi & Magda Liolis (Action League Now!); Michael Pearlstein (Sniz & Fondue); Stephen Holman & Clam Lynch (Life with Loopy); Joanna Ferrone (Angela Anaconda)	December 27, 1996	
June does the wrong hosting (for game shows, competitions, talk shows, etc.).; In Action League Now!, the Action League protects heirs to the pigeon legend.; June wants to be like Meltman and melts herself and Henry.; In Sniz and Fondue, Fondue gets stuck in an elevator and it's up to their favorite celebrity to save him.; June tries to make the perfect "KaBlam!" sound, and flattens Henry in the process.; In Life with Loopy, Loopy gets in a pickle while in the pantry.; June gets the crowd ready for the second part of Action League Now!; In Angela Anaconda, Angela has to scrape gum.; June refuses to turn the last page in order for the show to last "forever".
10	10	"A Little Dab'll Do Ya"	Mark Marek (Henry & June); Frank Gresham (Sniz & Fondue); Tim Hill (Action League Now!); Stephen Holman (Life with Loopy); Mo Willems (The Off-Beats)	Kevin Kopelow & Heath Seifert (Henry & June); Michael Pearlstein (Sniz & Fondue); Tim Hill (Action League Now!); Stephen Holman & Clam Lynch (Life with Loopy); Mo Willems & Josh Selig (The Off-Beats)	January 3, 1997	
Henry and June introduce "Smell-O-vision".; In Sniz and Fondue, Sniz gets jealous of a wooden dummy that Fondue associates with a lot, but in the end, everything is worked out.; June shows how cartoons can't feel pain, but Henry does.; In Action League Now!, Stinky Diver tries to get over his fear on saving a victim in a toilet. After turning scared several times, he finally gets over it.; Henry tries to plunge whatever is stuck in a toilet, but he pulls up Mr. Foot.; In Life with Loopy, Loopy looks for Larry's baseball which is under the sofa, it takes her a while to find it, but she eventually does.; June makes a deranged statue of Henry, and then redecorates Henry so he looks like the statue.; In The Off-Beats, September gets annoyed by Betty-Anne Bongo, Tommy, and Rapunzel.; Henry and June ride in a paper airplane and out of the comic book.
11	11	"Built for Speed"	Mark Marek (Henry & June); Frank Gresham (Sniz & Fondue); Tim Hill (Action League Now!); Tom McGrath (The Louie & Louie Show)	Robert Mittenthal & Will McRobb & Chris Viscardi (Henry & June); Michael Pearlstein (Sniz & Fondue); Tim Hill (Action League Now!); Ron Hauge (The Louie & Louie Show)	January 10, 1997	1.87
June messes with the TV controls, so she and Henry turn the page to Sniz and Fondue, In Sniz and Fondue, Fondue has a priceless model that Sniz wants to open. Sniz sneaks into Fondue's room, opens the model behind Fondue's back, ruins it and then finds out that Fondue wants to open it after all.; Henry and June show how they have stunt doubles.; In Action League Now!, Thundergirl is jealous of Lightning Lady.; Henry and June show other cartoon shows, all which are not as "kablamier" than the next segment....; In The Louie and Louie Show, a hamster and lizard try to get their owners to show attention to them.; Henry and June close the show by being early on saying goodbye.
12	12	"Comics of Champions"	Mark Marek (Henry & June); Regenald Groff III & Howard Hoffman (Action League Now!); Frank Gresham (Sniz & Fondue); Cote Zellers (Prometheus & Bob); Uncredited (Angela Anaconda)	Robert Mittenthal & Will McRobb & Chris Viscardi (Henry & June); Robert Mittenthal & Will McRobb & Chris Viscardi & Magda Liolis (Action League Now!); Michael Pearlstein (Sniz & Fondue); Cote Zellers (Prometheus & Bob); Joanna Ferrone (Angela Anaconda)	January 17, 1997	2.07
Henry's crush on Thunder Girl is revealed, and June constantly taunts him for it.; In Action League Now!, ThunderGirl rescues a boy in a garbage disposal.; Henry and June get new hairstyles.; In Sniz and Fondue, Sniz and Fondue take on a toy vending machine company when they empty an entire vending machine without receiving their desired toy.; Henry and June make baked Alaska.; In Prometheus and Bob, Bob tries to cook.; Henry is caught scooping earwax out of his ear.; In Angela Anaconda, Angela is angry with Nanette gets a valentine.; Henry and June skydive off of the comic book and Thunder Girl visits them, making Henry faint.; Features Action League Now! pilot
13	13	"Resistance Is Futile"	Mark Marek (Henry & June); Frank Gresham (Sniz & Fondue); Tim Hill (Action League Now!); Mo Willems (The Off-Beats); Cote Zellers (Prometheus & Bob)	Kevin Kopelow & Heath Siefert (Henry & June); Michael Pearlstein (Sniz & Fondue); Tim Hill (Action League Now!); Mo Willems & Josh Selig (The Off-Beats); Cote Zellers (Prometheus & Bob)	January 31, 1997	
Henry and June hold the "KaBlammy" awards.; In Sniz and Fondue, Sniz and Fondue get tricked into doing chores when they can't decide who gets the prize in a box of cereal.; In Action League Now!, the Action League have to babysit a witness for the Mayors trial.; Henry and June explain the principle of the Accordion Squash.; In The Off-Beats, Betty-Anne Bongo's glasses are stolen.; Henry and June announce other awards given the other night.; In Prometheus and Bob, Prometheus tries to teach Bob how to fly a kite.; Henry and June announce the winner of the "KaBlammy" award, which is Action League Now!

=== Season 2 (1997–98) ===
No. overall	No. in season	Title	Directed by	Written by	Original release date	Households (in millions)
14	1	"Won't Stick to Most Dental Work"	Mark Marek (Henry & June); Drew Edwards (Sniz & Fondue); Tim Hill (Action League Now!); Cote Zellers (Prometheus & Bob); Stephen Holman (Life with Loopy)	Michael Rubiner (Henry & June); Michael Pearlstein & Robert Scull & Robert Mittenthall & Michael Rubiner (Sniz & Fondue); Tim Hill (Action League Now!); Cote Zellers (Prometheus & Bob); Uncredited (Life with Loopy)	October 3, 1997	
Henry quits the show due to June mimicking him and constantly teasing him.; In Sniz and Fondue, Sniz buys Fondue a fancy new stereo, but can't afford to pay for or return its damaged CDs.; Henry opens his own restaurant, forgetting June and KaBlam!; In Action League Now!, Big Baby is released and kidnaps Bill's daughter, Quarky.; June sings a beautiful song to forget Henry, but it doesn't work out.; In Prometheus and Bob, Bob tries to learn pottery.; June gets a new co-host, Hector, who is a terrible co-host.; In Life with Loopy, Loopy becomes a butterfly.; Henry comes back to the show after June shows that she misses him.
15	2	"Won't Crack or Peel"	Mark Marek (Henry & June); Tim Hill (Action League Now!); Cote Zellers (Prometheus & Bob); Stephen Holman (Life with Loopy); Mo Willems (The Off-Beats)	Kevin Kopelow & Heath Seifert (Henry & June); Tim Hill (Action League Now!); Cote Zellers (Prometheus & Bob); Stephen Holman (Life with Loopy); Mo Willems & Josh Selig (The Off-Beats)	September 26, 1997	2.18
Henry and June introduce "KaBlam!-O-Vision", which doesn't work out too well when Henry messes up during a card game.; In Action League Now!, Flesh poses as an ambassador, that he accidentally destroyed.; Henry and June have a staring contest using the same technique.; In Prometheus and Bob, Prometheus teaches Bob about furniture.; Henry and June let the viewer listen to the sounds of the sea with a shell.; In Life with Loopy, Loopy grows a love to being upside-down.; Henry has the viewer blow a pinwheel, but it's not hard enough.; In The Off-Beats, Tommy goes insane due to lack of his coat.; Henry and June attempt to take a picture of the viewer.; Notes: The Henry & June segments were designed to be viewed with ChromaDepth glasses for Nickelodeon's "3D NoggleVision" week when the episode first aired. In later airings, the background behind Henry and June (which was meant to exploit ChromaDepth) was changed. This is the only known episode of KaBlam! to be released on VHS. It was a mail-in exclusive from Tombstone Pizza, and currently only one copy is known to exist. It is believed to be owned by Dirty Rabbit Records of San Francisco while the remaining VHSs are speculated to have been either repurposed or destroyed by Nickelodeon.
16	3	"Hurts So Good"	Mark Marek (Henry & June); Drew Edwards (Sniz & Fondue); Tim Hill (Action League Now!); Stephen Holman (Life with Loopy); Cote Zellers (Prometheus & Bob)	Michael Rubiner (Henry & June); Michael Pearlstein & Robert Scull & Robert Mittenthall & Michael Rubiner (Sniz & Fondue); Tim Hill (Action League Now!); Uncredited (Life with Loopy); Cote Zellers (Prometheus & Bob)	October 10, 1997	
Henry and June raise a campaign called "Staplethon", to raise more staples.; In Sniz and Fondue, Sniz sneaks into movies without admission.; Henry and June offer some products to the viewers, but they run out of calendars.; In Action League Now!, the League must save citizens from getting attacked by a "trophy bass".; Henry and June introduce one of their staplers.; In Life with Loopy, Loopy visits her dead goldfish.; Henry tries making animal balloons, angering Mr. Foot.; In Prometheus and Bob, Bob tries to learn how to box.; At the end, every main character from each cartoon (except The Off-Beats) sings, led by June.
17	4	"Harold's Glow-in-the-Dark Brand Butter"	Mark Marek (Henry & June); Tim Hill (Action League Now!); Cote Zellers (Prometheus & Bob); Stephen Holman (Life with Loopy); Mo Willems (The Off-Beats)	Kevin Kopelow & Heath Seifert (Henry & June); Tim Hill (Action League Now!); Cote Zellers (Prometheus & Bob); Uncredited (Life with Loopy); Mo Willems (The Off-Beats)	October 17, 1997	
Henry and June watch KaBloopers!, but they are all of Henry.; In Action League Now!, Hodge Podge returns and almost crushes the Action League.; Henry proves he is a heavy thinker, causing a ton of bricks to collapse on him.; In Prometheus and Bob, Prometheus tries to teach Bob to milk.; Randomly, a missile hits Henry.; In Life with Loopy, Loopy loses her voice and finds out it is in an opera singer's mouth. Loopy soon gets her voice back.; Henry and June switch voices.; In The Off-Beats, August makes a device that makes him cool and is accepted with the Populars, but they soon kick him out after they realize he plays paddleball, which is a "dork" game.; June advertises "Harold's Glow-in-the-Dark Butter", which angers Henry.
18	5	"Tastes Like Paper"	Mark Marek (Henry & June); Drew Edwards (Sniz & Fondue); Tim Hill (Action League Now!); Cote Zellers (Prometheus & Bob); Stephen Holman (Life with Loopy)	Matt Harrigan (Henry & June); Michael Pearlstein & Robert Scull & Robert Mittenthall & Michael Rubiner (Sniz & Fondue); Tim Hill (Action League Now!); Cote Zellers (Prometheus & Bob); Stephen Holman with Ben Nichols & Josephine Huang (Life with Loopy)	October 24, 1997	
Henry and June are put in animal costumes and learn they have a new director of research.; In Sniz and Fondue, Sniz becomes obsessed with shrimp cocktail, annoying Fondue.; A live band runs over Henry and June under the director of research's order.; In Action League Now!, Hodge Podge tricks the League with a voice box, injuring them all.; Henry and June become superheroes as a result of the director of research. They love it, until they get disintegrated by a UFO.; In Prometheus and Bob, Bob tries to learn how to work a canoe.; Henry and June realize the Mayor is the director of research and he put them through torture because he wanted to turn the page.; In Life with Loopy, Loopy searches for the flu bug.; Henry orders the band to run over the Mayor.
19	6	"I Just Don't Get It"	Mark Marek (Henry & June); Tim Hill (Action League Now!); Cote Zellers (Prometheus & Bob); Stephen Holman (Life with Loopy); Mo Willems (The Off-Beats)	Kevin Kopelow & Heath Seifert (Henry & June); Tim Hill (Action League Now!); Cote Zellers (Prometheus & Bob); Stephen Holman with Ben Nichols & Josephine Huang (Life with Loopy); Mo Willems (The Off-Beats)	November 7, 1997	
Henry and June show their audition tapes.; In Action League Now!, Thunder Girl is thrown in jail while The Mayor tries to destroy the US capital.; Henry accidentally washes his and June's clothes with invisible ink, causing them to become naked.; In Prometheus and Bob, Prometheus tries to teach Bob how to ice skate.; June bleeps out non-offensive words Henry says.; Life with Loopy: Loopy enters the TV while Larry is asleep.; Henry makes the artists give him chest hair.; In The Off-Beats, Tommy gets a song stuck in his head.; June plays around with Nutty-Putty, before making a clone of Henry.
20	7	"E Pluribus KaBlam!"	Mark Marek (Henry & June); Drew Edwards (Sniz & Fondue); Tim Hill (Action League Now!); Cote Zellers (Prometheus & Bob); Mo Willems (The Off-Beats)	Kevin Kopelow & Heath Seifert (Henry & June); Michael Pearlstein & Robert Scull & Robert Mittenthall & Michael Rubiner (Sniz & Fondue); Tim Hill (Action League Now!); Cote Zellers (Prometheus & Bob); Mo Willems (The Off-Beats)	November 14, 1997	
Henry and June think this is the 100th episode, but they mis-count.; In Sniz and Fondue, Fondue believes a clay doll of him is possessed.; Henry and June get massages.; In Action League Now!, aliens come down to earth, in peace and League shows them around, but they injure them, unintentionally. The aliens plan to destroy Earth, but are stopped or so they think.; Henry and June receive their own action figures; June's is great, while Henry's is a dud.; In Prometheus and Bob, Prometheus tries to teach Bob on how to use a leverage.; Henry tries to speak Italian but horribly fails.; In The Off-Beats, Rapunzil has a slim chance at winning a $1,000,000 sweepstakes. After she leaves her friends, due to them not believing she'll win, the Populars use her for her money, but soon realize she doesn't have any. They kick her out and Rapunzil is accepted back in with her friends.; Henry gets a love letter from his mother.
21	8	"Better Than a Poke in the Eye"	Mark Marek (Henry & June); Tim Hill (Action League Now!); Cote Zellers (Prometheus & Bob); Federico Vitali (Lava); Mo Willems (The Off-Beats)	Robert Mittenthal & Will McRobb & Chris Viscardi & Michael Rubiner & Jyllian Gunther (Henry & June); Robert Mittenthal & Will McRobb & Chris Viscardi & Michael Rubiner & Ben Wexler (Action League Now!); Cote Zellers (Prometheus & Bob); Federico Vitali (Lava); Mo Willems and Robert Leighton (The Off-Beats)	November 21, 1997	
Henry and June host a studio tour. They see Loopy's house, and a naked guy running who looks similar to The Flesh.; In Action League Now!, the Flesh's "parents" visit, for them to turn out frauds.; Henry and June wind up in a tunnel and encounter Prometheus and Bob on the tour.; In Prometheus and Bob, Prometheus tries to teach Bob how to use a spear and trapping.; Henry and June show everyone how sound effects are made.; Surprising Shorts: In Lava, an unsuspecting wolf crushes a hungry lizard.; Henry and June let two kids into the studio, who mock the duo and turn out to be creepy.; In The Off-Beats, Betty-Ann Bongo sprains her wrist, and the Populars are jealous of her attention.; Henry and June end the tour on a high note with the Off-Beats Stunt Spectacular.; Spear is the only time Bob does something right in Prometheus and Bob.
22	9	"Get Sam Donaldson's Mystery Bag"	Unknown	Unknown	December 5, 1997	
June joins Sam Donaldson's fan club, making Henry and June think of making their own fan club.; In Sniz and Fondue, Sniz pulls too far of a prank and ends up in the insane asylum.; Henry shows June the fan club newsletter, but she gets mad when it's only about Henry, causing them to make two separate fan clubs.; In Action League Now!, Quarky gets superpowers due to the Mayor's nuclear reactor.; Henry starts offering products of himself for his fan club, while June gives out a voodoo doll of Henry.; In Prometheus and Bob, Bob tries to learn how to farm.; Henry and June compete against each other in a robot war.; In The Brothers Tiki, the brothers find themselves stranded on Earth.; Henry and June make up for their fighting, and hug.; Unlike most episodes, this one is uncredited since the closing credits don't appear.
23	10	"Cramming Cartoons Since 1627"	Mark Marek (Henry & June); Tim Hill (Action League Now!); Cote Zellers (Prometheus & Bob); Stephen Holman (Life with Loopy); Gordon P. Clark (The Brothers Tiki)	Michael Rubiner (Henry & June); Tim Hill (Action League Now!); Cote Zellers (Prometheus & Bob); Stephen Holman with Ben Nichols & Josephine Huang (Life with Loopy); Gordon P. Clark (The Brothers Tiki)	December 12, 1997	
It's Parents Day and Henry's mom and June's dad come to visit on the show, but they quickly turn out to be annoying and embarrassing.; In Action League Now!, the Mayor kidnaps the Chief, Flesh, Meltman and Thundergirl and plans to roast them in a turkey, leaving it up to Stinky Diver to save them.; Both parents are still annoying, as they don't understand Action League Now! and then June's dad accidentally injures Henry.; In Prometheus and Bob, Prometheus teaches Bob how to make breakfast by trying to take a bird's egg from a nest.; Henry's mom shows everyone a picture of Henry when he was little and dressed up as a pilgrim and June's dad shows a video of June in the bathtub when she was a baby, each embarrassing to both kids.; In Life with Loopy, Loopy tags along with Larry to The Charlie Chicken Show on Ice and plans to get back at the hosts of the show after they threw a pie at her dress.; Henry's mom and June's dad break into a fight after arguing over Henry and June.; In The Brothers Tiki, the alien brothers try several ways to get off of Earth, with most of them failing. Once they succeed, they contact aliens from their home to take them home, but this also doesn't work out.; Henry's mom and June's dad apologize to one another and Henry and June for misbehaving. Henry and June forgive them and let them to turn the last page.
24	11	"Hand Cranked for Your Enjoyment"	Unknown	Unknown	December 26, 1997	
Vikings move in the studio and destroy the set, annoying Henry and June.; In Sniz and Fondue, Fondue searches for a new hat while Sniz is wearing his.; The Vikings give Henry and June their hats, who don't know they were coming back.; In Action League Now!, Meltman becomes a giant.; Henry uses the same growth formula as Meltman to attack the Vikings, with bad results.; In Prometheus and Bob, Bob tries to learn construction.; June invites the Vikings over to the studio.; In The Girl with Her Head Coming Off, by Emily Hubley, a girl has a crush on a boy.; The Vikings express their feelings about the previous cartoon, and then destroy the set.; Note: This episode has no closing credits as a result of its' segments completely filling the episode's runtime.
25	12	"Art + Science = Fun"	Mark Marek (Henry & June); Tim Hill (Action League Now!); Brian Mulroney & Mike de Seve (Randall Flan's Incredible Big Top); Mo Willems (The Off-beats)	Heath Seifert & Kevin Kopelow and Stanley Schwartz (Henry & June); Tim Hill (Action League Now!); Brian Mulroney & Mike de Sève (Randall Flan's Incredible Big Top); Mo Willems and Robert Leighton (The Off-beats)	January 2, 1998	
Henry gets a bad haircut and June makes it worse.; In Action League Now!, a new superhero team called the Danger Society visits and almost kicks the League out of town.; Henry worries that the Action League is doomed, but then he and June accidentally rip the page and June suggests they can fix it with tape. As Henry mocks this idea, she tapes his mouth to the page.; In Randall Flan's Incredible Big Top, Bravado plans to perform at the circus, and as he unintentionally does, the crowd loves him.; June sings the KaBlammer! song, but Henry keeps joining in while badly playing various instruments.; In The Off-Beats, August goes for the paddleball record, but stops as he sees September needs him.; Henry tries to break a world record and unknowingly he becomes the first human field goal as Mr. Foot kicks him through a field goal.
26	13	"KaBlam! James KaBlam!"	Mark Marek (Henry & June); Uncredited (Sniz & Fondue); Tim Hill (Action League Now!); Mo Willems (The Off-beats); Greg Harrison (Patchhead)	Matt Harrigan (Henry & June); Michael Pearlstein & Robert Scull & Robert Mittenthall & Michael Rubiner (Sniz & Fondue); Tim Hill (Action League Now!); Uncredited (The Off-Beats); Greg Harrison (Patchhead)	January 16, 1998	
Henry and June teach their new intern Lyle Baxter the "Broadcasting Rules".; In Sniz and Fondue, Sniz and Fondue's house is infested with bugs.; In Action League Now!, Big Baby (played by Harry Connick Jr.) wrecks a Kiss concert.; Lyle hits Henry with a microphone.; In The Off-Beats, everyone is worried things will fall on their heads.; In The Adventures of Patchhead, Patchhead competes in the Blue Collar Holler Kids' Golf Classic.; Lyle turns out to be creepy, so they hit him with a microphone.; Last episode to show The Off-Beats as Mo Willems decided to focus on working for Sesame Street and Sheep in the Big City.

=== Season 3 (1998–99) ===
No. overall	No. in season	Title	Directed by	Written by	Original release date
27	1	"More Happiness Than Allowed by Law"	Mark Marek (Henry & June); Rafael Rosado (JetCat); Tim Hill (Action League Now!); Cote Zellers (Prometheus & Bob); Stephen Holman (Life with Loopy)	Heath Seifert & Kevin Kopelow (Henry & June); Paul Lacy & Fred Schaefer & Jay Stephens (JetCat); Tim Hill & David Fain & Jay Martel (Action League Now!); Cote Zellers (Prometheus & Bob); Stephen Holman & Josephine T. Haung & Ben Nichols (Life with Loopy)	September 4, 1998
It's Henry and June's birthday episode and Henry gets a remote-controlled car while he forgets to get June a present.; In JetCat, Todd takes advantage of Melanie now that he knows she is Jetcat. Though when he is in danger, they make up.; Henry tries to make his mistake up to June by giving her a cake, though it is obvious he took it from a wedding.; In Action League Now!, an old enemy of Stinky Diver called the Red Ninja, returns to face him in a duel.; The bride and groom arrive and shove the cake down Henry's throat for taking it. He begins to choke and Mr. Foot saves him, and injures him, when he gives him a violent abdominal thrust.; In Prometheus and Bob, Bob tries to learn how to use a hammock.; Henry, truly trying this time, gives June a cupcake with a candle in it. June enjoys it until the smoke from the candle turns the ceiling sprinklers on.; In Life with Loopy, Loopy clones her dad so there can be enough of him to go around for the whole family, but it soon gets out of hand.; Henry buys June a mood ring, finally making her happy.
28	2	"Money Train 2"	Mark Marek (Henry & June); Drew Edwards (Sniz & Fondue); Tim Hill (Action League Now!); Cote Zellers (Prometheus & Bob); Stephen Holman (Life with Loopy)	Mark Hentemann & Robert Mittenthal & Chris Viscardi & Michael Rubiner & Randolph Heard & Francis Gasparini & Will McRobb (Henry & June); Robert Mittenthal (Sniz & Fondue); Tim Hill & Jay Martel (Action League Now!); Cote Zellers (Prometheus & Bob); Stephen Holman & Josephine T. Haung & Ben Nichols (Life with Loopy)	September 11, 1998
Henry and June meet their fan of the month, who turns out to be a convict.; In Sniz and Fondue, Fondue becomes addicted to playing solitaire on his computer and this soon becomes a problem that Sniz has to fix.; Henry and June introduce KaBlam! the Musical.; In Action League Now!, the Mayor steals a mummy's opal and the Flesh unintentionally releases the mummy, creating two problems the League has to fix.; Since June says she hates villains, Henry explains why there are villains in Action League Now! and how dull it would be without them.; In Prometheus and Bob, Prometheus tries to teach Bob how to play with a ball.; Henry and June "mountain climb" to the top of the page.; In Life with Loopy, Loopy uses Larry's radio transmission and contacts two aliens, only to have them come down to her house and trash it up.; Henry and June try to guess who the mystery page turner is who is beside them but blocked by a wall so they can't see the person. After they frequently try to guess who it is, (with all of their guesses being wrong) it turns out to be Ben Franklin.
29	3	"Your Logo Here"	Mark Marek (Henry & June); Drew Edwards (Sniz & Fondue); Tim Hill (Action League Now!); Stephen Holman (Life with Loopy); Cote Zellers (Prometheus & Bob)	Michael Rubiner and Stanley Schwartz (Henry & June); Francis Gasparini (Sniz & Fondue); Tim Hill & Jay Martel (Action League Now!); Stephen Holman & Josephine T. Haung & Ben Nichols (Life with Loopy); Cote Zellers (Prometheus & Bob)	November 20, 1998
In order to make KaBlam! more educational, Henry and June explain what onomatopoeia is.; In Sniz and Fondue, Fondue believes a crook is in his house, though it is Sniz, who is sleepwalking.; Henry and June introduce Ed the Educational Otter, who tries to help make the show more educational.; In Action League Now!, a baby spider begins to think Meltman is its mother, though this seems cute, things turn hectic when the real mother appears.; Henry and June talk about the educational value of Action League Now!; In Life with Loopy, Loopy discovers her mother is a secret agent who has an alien hidden in the house.; Henry and June look at a comic book, which angers Ed, as it isn't educational.; In Prometheus and Bob, Prometheus tries his best to help Bob celebrate his own birthday.; Henry and June trap Ed, getting him off their nerves.
30	4	"Holdeth the Pickle, Holdeth the Lettuce"	Mark Marek (Henry & June); Rafael Rosado (JetCat); Tim Hill (Action League Now!); Cote Zellers (Prometheus & Bob); Stephen Holman (Life with Loopy)	Kevin Strader (Henry & June); Fred Schaefer & Jay Stephens (JetCat); Chris Viscardi (Action League Now!); Cote Zellers (Prometheus & Bob); Stephen Holman & Josephine T. Haung & Ben Nichols (Life with Loopy)	October 9, 1998
Henry and June's set takes place in Colonial Williamsburg.; In Jetcat, Todd interviews a villain for a school project when Jetcat refuses to be interviewed.; Henry and June learn that nothing interesting happens after interviewing some people.; In Action League Now!, the League gets cloned and even though it may seem as a good thing, now that there are more superheroes, things go crazy.; Henry and June turn annoyed as they try to learn their carriage driver's name.; In Prometheus and Bob, Bob tries to learn how to use a toilet.; Henry and June find a pond and go swimming, though they didn't realize that the people in Colonial Williamsburg don't accept this.; In Life with Loopy, Loopy makes Snow-Lady, a snow-woman who comes to life, and tries to prevent her from melting.; Henry and June end up in stocks.
31	5	"It's All In The Wrist"	Mark Marek (Henry & June); Drew Edwards (Sniz & Fondue); Mike Mitchell (Action League Now!); Cote Zellers (Prometheus & Bob); Stephen Holman (Life with Loopy)	Andy Rhinegold & Michael Rubiner & Robert Mittenthal & Randolph Heard & Will McRobb & Francis Gasparini & Chris Viscardi (Henry & June); Randolph Heard (Sniz & Fondue); Tim Hill & Jay Martel (Action League Now!); Cote Zellers (Prometheus & Bob); Stephen Holman & Josephine T. Haung & Ben Nichols (Life with Loopy)	October 23, 1998
Though at first he opposed of it, Henry begins to dance along with everyone else.; In Sniz and Fondue, Sniz and Fondue believe they have a magic hose that heals people, though it doesn't.; Henry takes a blind-folded tasting test where he must choose between a drink and KaBlam!; In Action League Now!, the Mayor steals a painting and it's up to the League to get it back.; June explains how the sound system works and how the viewer will interpret what will happen.; In Prometheus and Bob, Prometheus and Bob try to build a treehouse.; Henry finds out why June beats him at a hand-slapping game.; In Life with Loopy, Loopy and her friend Mike, a flightless bird, head south.; Henry and June try out the KaBlam! arcade game.
32	6	"Year Round Fun"	Mark Marek (Henry & June); Drew Edwards (Sniz & Fondue); Mike Mitchell (Action League Now!); Cote Zellers (Prometheus & Bob); Stephen Holman (Life with Loopy)	Francis Gasparini (Henry & June); Kevin Kopelow & Heath Seifert (story), Michael Rubiner (script) (Sniz & Fondue); Robert Mittenthal (Action League Now!); Cote Zellers (Prometheus & Bob); Stephen Holman & Josephine T. Haung & Ben Nichols (Life with Loopy)	November 6, 1998
The writers of KaBlam! go on strike, leaving Henry and June clueless on what to do.; In Sniz and Fondue, Sniz and Fondue enter a chili competition so they ride in a fire truck. After disagreeing on things, they oppose each other. In the end, they apologize, but cause an explosion, with neither one of them getting to ride in the fire truck.; Henry and June do and say everything backwards, trying to prove they can handle the show without the writers. This idea soon fails.; In Action League Now!, a dog befriends Stinky Diver, but Stinky soon realizes that this dog was under cover working for the Mayor so he can plan revenge.; Henry tries to do a magic act, where he pulls things out of Mr. Foot's ear. This idea also fails.; In Prometheus and Bob, Bob tries to learn how to sleep on a bed.; Henry and June come to do what they originally always did on the show, which was Mr. Foot injuring Henry.; In Life with Loopy, Loopy tries to stop Larry from having the same repeating dream. After visiting a studio and battling a monster, she succeeds.; The writers come back to the show, relieving Henry and June.; The last episode to show Sniz & Fondue due to the production company beginning work on a TV adaption of Watership Down.
37	7	"The New Class"	Mark Marek (Henry & June); Mike Mitchell (Action League Now!); Cote Zellers (Prometheus & Bob); Stephen Holman (Life with Loopy); Greg Harrison (Patchhead)	James Greenberg & Michael Rubiner & Robert Mittenthal & Randolph Heard & Chris Viscardi & Francis Gasparini & Will McRobb (Henry & June); Jay Martel (Action League Now!); Cote Zellers (Prometheus & Bob); Stephen Holman & Josephine T. Haung & Ben Nichols (Life with Loopy); Greg Harrison (Patchhead)	January 15, 1999
Henry and June have a new director, Glen Dilworth.; In Action League Now!, the League is foiled by the Mayor when they think they're in a big acting business, when it's just the Mayor trying to injure them.; Glen gets on June's nerves when he keeps nagging her for more emotion in her line.; In Prometheus and Bob, Bob tries to learn how to work Prometheus' robot.; Glen makes Henry and June perform falling exercises.; In Life with Loopy, Loopy puts fake vampire teeth under her pillow and is turned into a werewolf for her action.; Glen admits he was fired from his last directing job, he then bumps into Mr. Foot, angering him.; In The Adventures of Patchhead, Patchhead must stop a Torque Dipstick's car from racing after it was sabotaged by an opposing racer.; Henry tricks Glen into leaving the set, but what happens is that he runs into Mr. Foot who stuffs him in the trunk of a car.
33	8	"Great for Paper Training"	Mark Marek (Henry & June); David Fain (Action League Now!); Cote Zellers (Prometheus & Bob); Stephen Holman (Life with Loopy); Chris Koch (Race Rabbit)	Francis Gasparini (Henry & June); Michael Rubiner (Action League Now!); Cote Zellers (Prometheus & Bob); Stephen Holman & Josephine T. Haung & Ben Nichols (Life with Loopy); Scott Fellows (Race Rabbit)	December 11, 1998
A dog, which June names Wolf, follows June to the set and she and Henry argue over who gets to keep him.; In Action League Now!, Meltman's girlfriend, Andrea, tries to get him to be paid more attention from the League.; Wolf urinates on one of June's celebrity wigs, telling Henry they need to paper train him, but Henry reminds her it's her dog.; In Prometheus and Bob, Bob tries to learn how to watch television.; After Wolf destroys the set, he scares Mr. Foot, causing him to wreck into Henry and June.; In Life with Loopy, Loopy visits an organization where she goes through a series of tests to cure her clumsiness.; Wolf's fleas escape from him and attack Henry and June.; In Race Rabbit, Race must deliver a tooth to a young boy, while avoiding the Boolies, and winning and finishing the race.; After realizing Wolf is gone, Henry and June panic and search for him. He then comes out, without them seeing, and tears up an award they won.
34	9	"You'll Love Our Selection"	Mark Marek (Henry & June); David Fain (Action League Now!); Cote Zellers (Prometheus & Bob); Stephen Holman (Life with Loopy); Chris Koch (Race Rabbit)	Randolph Heard (Henry & June); Jay Martel (Action League Now!); Cote Zellers (Prometheus & Bob); Stephen Holman & Josephine T. Haung & Ben Nichols (Life with Loopy); Scott Fellows (Race Rabbit)	January 29, 1999
The KaBlam! meter rates Henry and June as 6's, but Mr. Foot gets a 10.; In Action League Now!, the Mayor injures football players so he can be on the team.; Against their will, Henry and June show "A Day in the Life of Mr. Foot".; In Prometheus and Bob, Bob tries to survive in the arctic.; Mr. Foot shows how he is great at the drums, angering Henry and June.; In Life with Loopy, Larry and Loopy get swallowed by a whale and find two TV stars.; A clip of Mr. Foot's new movie is shown, while Henry and June are still angry.; In Race Rabbit, Race must deliver baby food to a father of a baby before the feeding.; Henry and June finally get a place of liking on KaBlam!, though they realize it's Mr. Foot throwing cards at them, pinning them to a wall.
35	10	"You May Already Be a...KaBlammer!"	Mark Marek (Henry & June); David Fain (Action League Now!); Cote Zellers (Prometheus & Bob); Stephen Holman (Life with Loopy); R.O. Blechman (Hockey Monkey)	Ariel Leve & Michael Rubiner & Robert Mittenthal & Randolph Heard & Chris Viscardi & Francis Gasparini & Will McRobb (Henry & June); Jay Martel (Action League Now!); Cote Zellers (Prometheus & Bob); Stephen Holman & Josephine T. Haung & Ben Nichols (Life with Loopy); Jimmy Kroekel and The Zambonis (Hockey Monkey)	February 26, 1999
Jimmy McGee joins KaBlam! to make the show funnier.; In Action League Now!, Hodge Podge releases a song on the radio that places people under hypnotism, making them want to destroy the League.; Henry tries to prove he can be funny, too, though he fails.; In Prometheus and Bob, Prometheus tries to teach Bob how to do laundry.; Henry pays Mr. Foot to laugh at Henry's jokes, but Mr. Foot doesn't exactly go along with the idea.; In Life with Loopy, Loopy ends up trapped in a doghouse guarded by a mean dog.; Henry's mom appears to help him be funny, but after Jimmy makes fun of Henry, Henry's mom and Jimmy begin to fight.; Following is a music video called Hockey Monkey, about a monkey playing hockey with kids.; Henry's mom and Jimmy still fight and Henry finally makes a good joke, at least it was funny to June.; Lou Rawls makes an appearance in the Action League Now! segment and "Hockey Monkey" was performed by The Zambonis, written by Jimminy Kroekel.
36	11	"KaFun!"	Mark Marek (Henry & June); David Fain (Action League Now!); Cote Zellers (Prometheus & Bob); Stephen Holman (Life with Loopy); Mark Marek (Pizza Rocket); Graham Falk (Untalkative Bunny)	Will McRobb (Henry & June); Robert Mittenthal (Action League Now!); Cote Zellers (Prometheus & Bob); Stephen Holman & Josephine T. Huang & Ben Nichols (Life with Loopy); Jimmy Kroekel and The Zambonis (Pizza Rocket); Graham Falk (Untalkative Bunny)	March 12, 1999
Henry and June look at Kablam! sports updates, though Henry thinks the new addition ruins the show.; In Action League Now!, the Action League must convince an entire courtroom of their actions (through flashbacks) to avoid termination.; Henry wears sunglasses and tries to act cool, making June annoyed.; In Prometheus and Bob, Prometheus tries to teach Bob how to use glue.; Henry and June use deodorant.; In Life with Loopy, Loopy tries to find a girl for Larry to go to a dance with.; In a music video called Pizza Rocket, an astronaut tries to get to "the big pizza in the center of the galaxy".; Henry explains how KaBlam episodes are scripted months in advance, while June denies what he says.; In Untalkative Bunny, Bunny gets a call from a telemarketer.; Henry and June find a Japanese cartoon called "KaFun!". Believing it's a knockoff, they watch a clip of the show and find Henry in it.

=== Season 4 (1999–2000) ===
No. overall	No. in season	Title	Directed by	Written by	Original release date
38	1	"Sasquatch-ercise"	Uncredited (Henry & June); David Fain (Action League Now!); Cote Zellers (Prometheus & Bob); Stephen Holman (Life with Loopy); Tom Megalis (Emmett Freedy)	Andy Rheingold (Henry & June); Jay Martel (Action League Now!); Cote Zellers (Prometheus & Bob); Stephen Holman & Josephine T. Haung & Steffan Chirazi (Life with Loopy); Tom Megalis (Emmett Freedy)	March 11, 2000
Henry and June are overweight and get a memo saying if they don't pass a physical fitness test, they'll be forced to retire.; In Action League Now!, the Flesh fails a test and is kicked out of the League, but the rest of the team offers to tutor him for a make up test.; Richard Simmons arrives and he, Henry and June start exercising.; In Prometheus and Bob, Bob tries to learn how to play softball.; Henry and June are in aching pain, so they suggest they eat something. Richard agrees until Henry and June start eating junk food.; In Life with Loopy, Loopy's hamster, Edison, accidentally turns into a giant and she must find him.; Henry and June do pull-ups and Richard is proud until he sees that they're standing on Mr. Foot.; In Emmett Freedy, Emmett accidentally gets a piece of cereal on his head but everyone thinks he has lice.; Henry and June realize that they passed the test for standing the punishment.
39	2	"Takes a Knockin' and Keeps Tick-Tockin'"	Uncredited (Henry & June); David Fain (Action League Now!); Cote Zellers (Prometheus & Bob); Stephen Holman (Life with Loopy); Kevin Dougherty (Fuzzball)	Adam Idelson & Jay Martel & Robert Mittenthal & Mike Rubiner (Henry & June); Jay Martel (Action League Now!); Cote Zellers (Prometheus & Bob); Stephen Holman & Josephine T. Haung & Steffan Chirazi (Life with Loopy); Julie Rottenberg (Fuzzball)	March 18, 2000
Mr. Stockdale arranges for Henry to get injured because ratings find it funny.; In Action League Now!, the Mayor has a fan that causes a freak windstorm, planning to use it against the League.; Henry begins to rebel against the idea of his injuries. As June tries to reassure him, she also gets injured.; In Prometheus and Bob, Bob takes an IQ test.; Henry and June both rebel against Mr. Stockdale and after he tries to bribe them, they quit.; In Life with Loopy, Larry becomes very strong, in order to beat a bully, but his incredible strength becomes a problem.; Henry and June notice that robot replicas of them have replaced them as hosts of KaBlam! They plan to go beg for their jobs back.; In Fuzzball, Fuzzball must find a way to fix her dad's broken bowling trophy, in which she broke.; Henry and June beg to Mr. Stockdale for their jobs back. After being rejected, they unplug the robots, making Mr. Stockdale rehire them, though they both get injured once again.
40	3	"In It to Win It"	Uncredited (Henry & June); David Fain (Action League Now!); Cote Zellers (Prometheus & Bob); Stephen Holman (Life with Loopy); Steven Dovas (Garbage Boy)	Julie Bottenberg & Jay Martel & Robert Mittenthal & Mike Rubiner (Henry & June); Jay Martel (Action League Now!); Cote Zellers (Prometheus & Bob); Stephen Holman & Josephine T. Huang & Steffan Chirazi (Life with Loopy); Stephen Kroninger (story) & Andy Rheingold (script) (Garbage Boy)	March 4, 2000
Henry and June see that they have a new set with a huge window with fans outside watching the show.; In Action League Now!, the Mayor releases many, many chicks that cause havok in the town.; Outside with the fans, June interviews three fans that are dressed like her. They soon begin to get angry with her, thinking she isn't the real June.; In Prometheus and Bob, Prometheus tries to teach Bob about magnetism.; As Henry and June see that the window isn't working out, Henry notices Mr. Foot showering, which causes the window to fog up and Henry and June are pleased until Mr. Foot uses the bathroom, which stinks up the place. Henry and June quickly open the window and are pleased until the fans attack them.; In Life with Loopy, Loopy makes a remote that can rewind and forward time.; Henry and June decide to ignore the fans, but because of this, they break in, with good stealth, and steal everything.; In Garbage Boy, Danny makes a pet dog with garbage that he collects.; Henry and June are happy that the fans are gone until they realize no one is watching the show. They then call out for the fans to come back.
41	4	"The Best of Both Worlds"	Uncredited (Henry & June); David Fain (Action League Now!); Cote Zellers (Prometheus & Bob); Stephen Holman (Life with Loopy); David Hamby & Al Lowenheim (The Shizzagee)	P. Kevin Strader & Jay Martel & Robert Mittenthal & Mike Rubiner (Henry & June); Jay Martel (Action League Now!); Cote Zellers (Prometheus & Bob); Stephen Holman & Josephine T. Huang & Steffan Chirazi (Life with Loopy); Steve Freeman (The Shizzagee)	April 15, 2000
Henry and June find photographs of the real world and plan to go there.; In Action League Now!, the League must stop a meteor that is coming toward Earth.; Henry and June buy tickets to go to the real world, but they are ripped off when they are flung onto the camera.; In Prometheus and Bob, it shows how Prometheus and Bob all got started.; Henry and June drill a hole in a wall to get to the real world, only to find out they drilled a hole in a wall to a bathroom.; In Life with Loopy, Loopy tries several attempts to help her friend Mike, a flightless bird, to fly.; Henry and June give up on finding the real world until they find a door that says "REAL WORLD". They enter the real world and get on real bikes. They enjoy it until they fall and feel real world pain. They go back to being cartoons.; In The Shizzagee, Shiz and Brutus head to the Amazon to see another shizzagee, proving that they aren't extinct.; Henry and June are proud to be the first cartoons to enter the real world until they see Mr. Foot picking up a pizza from the real world, seeing that he entered some time before they did.
42	5	"A Nut in Every Bite!"	Uncredited (Henry & June; Action League Now!); Chris Gilligan (Race Rabbit); Cote Zellers (Prometheus & Bob); Stephen Holman (Life with Loopy)	Francis Gasparini & Jay Martel & Robert Mittenthal & Mike Rubiner (Henry & June); Uncredited (Action League Now!; Life with Loopy); Scott Fellows (Race Rabbit); Cote Zellers (Prometheus & Bob)	April 1, 2000
Mr. Stockdale's granddaughter, Dawn, visits and Henry instantly develops a crush on her.; In Race Rabbit, Race must find a Prince who has been kidnapped by gold dingoes.; Henry tells June to ask Dawn if she likes him. After June gets confused, and though Dawn never said it, June lies to Henry saying that Dawn likes him back.; In Action League Now!, the League and Bill the Lab Guy are trapped on an island filled with dinosaurs.; June tells Henry that she lied to him, but he doesn't believe her. After he angers her, she throws her shoe at him and he is embarrassed in front of Dawn, but she thinks his pain is funny, which Henry is okay with.; In Prometheus and Bob, Bob tries to learn how to exercise.; Henry tries to actually talk to Dawn instead of injure himself, but he fails.; In Life with Loopy, Loopy searches for her milk that went bad.; As Dawn leaves, Henry is glad she is leaving because of his injuries, but as the plane she is on starts up, the fire jets melt him.
43	6	"Now with More Flava'!"	Uncredited (Henry & June); Chris Gilligan (Race Rabbit); David Fain (Action League Now!); Stephen Holman (Life with Loopy)	Andy Rheingold & Jay Martel & Robert Mittenthal & Mike Rubiner (Henry & June); Scott Fellows (Race Rabbit); Jay Martel (Action League Now!); Stephen Holman & Josephine T. Huang & Steffan Chirazi (Life with Loopy)	April 8, 2000
Henry and June notice John Stamos working as a security guard at KaBlam! They wonder how such a big star ended up as a security guard, which makes them wonder about themselves.; In Race Rabbit, the Boolies plant a bomb on a remote controlled girl rabbit that Race falls in love with.; Henry and June start rapping to try to save their jobs. Busta Rhymes visits them to see how good they are and after hearing them, he says they are terrible.; In Action League Now!, the Chief is dying and the League recalls on memories of when they accidentally injured him.; Henry and June try to impress fans at a mall, but it doesn't work out; they also try to sell things from the show, but no one buys anything.; In Life with Loopy, a band stays at Loopy's house and learn that being a kid isn't so easy.; Henry and June are replaced as hosts of KaBlam! by John Stamos and end up working as security guards.
44	7	"Timeless!"	Uncredited (Henry & June); David Fain (Action League Now!); Cote Zellers (Prometheus & Bob); Rafael Rosado (JetCat); Stephen Holman (Life with Loopy)	Barbara Herel & Robert Mittenthal & Jay Martel & Michael Rubiner (Henry & June); Jay Martel (Action League Now!); Cote Zellers (Prometheus & Bob); Fred Schaefer & Jay Stephens (JetCat); Stephen Holman & Josephine T. Huang & Steffan Chirazi (Life with Loopy)	December 31, 1999
Henry and June make a time capsule, but Henry puts his report card in the time capsule, due to his mom needing to sign it for his school.; In Action League Now!, The Chief and Mayor's faces have been switched.; Henry forces Mr. Foot to un-dig the time capsule.; In Prometheus and Bob, Bob tries to learn how to date.; Mr. Foot makes an even bigger time capsule, but it hits the panel below.; Jetcat: Lunchtime.; Mr. Foot finds the perfect spot to put a time capsule. But there is another one and Mr. Foot accidentally buries Henry's phone.; Life with Loopy: Down the Drain.; Mr. Foot puts Henry and June in the time capsule.
45	8	"The KaBlair! Witch Project"	Uncredited (Henry & June); Rafael Rosado (JetCat); David Fain (Action League Now!); Stephen Holman (Life with Loopy)	Mike Rubiner (Henry & June); Fred Schaefer & Jay Stephens (JetCat); Jay Martel (Action League Now!); Stephen Holman & Josephine T. Huang & Steffan Chirazi (Life with Loopy)	May 6, 2000
Henry, June, Henry's mom, Mr. Stockdale, Jimmy McGee, and Mr. Foot are basically on a camping trip. When they hear a creature growl, Mr. Foot gets scared and drives off, leaving the rest with nothing while stuck in the woods.; In Jetcat, Todd is turned into a moth after trying to help Jetcat on a mission.; A bear appears, scaring the group until Henry's mom scares it off. Henry reveals he has a GPS, but Mr. Stockdale, having army flashbacks, thinks it is a grenade and throws it over a cliff.; In Action League Now!, after Smarty Pants plans to steal the world's knowledge, the League places it in Flesh's brain, making him a genius and the only one to save the League when they are caught by Smarty Pants.; From some berries, June makes a pie for everyone but realizes she messed up the ingredients, which causes everyone to get sick. They all then see a plane, but they fail to signal it. Mr. Stockdale's cell phone rings and he throws it, saying he is in a meeting, which causes it to break, angering everyone.; In Life with Loopy, Loopy accidentally sells her father and she must get him back from two aliens who bought him.; The group sees a river and gives up hope until June reassures everyone that they will cross it. After getting everyone over, they're happy with each other about how they worked as a team, until they see Mr. Foot come back for them in the car on the previous side of the river.
46	9	"Going the Extra Mile"	Uncredited (Henry & June); David Fain (Action League Now!); Cote Zellers (Prometheus & Bob); Aaron White & Joe Rossu (The Little Freaks); Jesse Gordon (Doctor Worm)	Jay Martel (Henry & June, Action League Now!); Cote Zellers (Prometheus & Bob); Rick Groel (story & script), Aaron White & Joe Russo (story) (The Little Freaks); They Might Be Giants (Doctor Worm)	May 13, 2000
Ryan, a weird kid from Henry and June's school, wins a contest to hang out on the show with Henry and June.; In Action League Now!, Hodge Podge sabotages the League's car, which causes the League to think it's Meltman's fault, but they soon realize they made a mistake.; Ryan shows the viewers rare footage of when Henry and June were little and in commercials, advertising diapers and getting kicked by a cow, which are embarrassing to Henry and June.; In Prometheus and Bob, Prometheus tries to teach Bob how to care for a pet.; Ryan gets to direct the segment of the show, which annoys Henry and June as he makes "Henry and June" and "Henry and June rule!" banners appear on the screen.; In The Little Freaks, three freaky superheroes must stop No-face and his clothe-eating mothes.; Henry and June see Ryan taking the set as a sovinier, getting annoyed for the last time. They both then notice that all of the submissions that chose the contest winner have Ryan's name on them.; In a music video called Doctor Worm, a worm wants to play the drums.; After Henry and June show a video of Ryan stuffing a box with submissions of his name on them, he is then thrown in the trunk of a car by Mr. Foot.; "Doctor Worm" was performed by They Might Be Giants.
47	10	"Under New Management"	David Fain (Action League Now!); Cote Zellers (Prometheus & Bob); Jesse Gordon (Jesse Gordon)	Jay Martel (Henry & June, Action League Now!); Cote Zellers (Prometheus & Bob); Peter Hendrixson & Dennis Messner (Stewy the Dogboy)	May 20, 2000
Mr. Stockdale tells Henry and June to fire Mr. Foot. As Henry attempts this, Mr. Foot punches him.; In Action League Now!, after the Flesh gets infected with a body-eating virus, everyone else also gets infected with it.; Henry and June try to do Mr. Foot's job for him by fixing a sign so he won't have to be fired, but the end result turns out with Mr. Foot accidentally electrocuting Henry and June.; In Prometheus and Bob, Prometheus creates an evolution chamber where he tries to change Bob into an educated human.; Henry thinks of all the times where Mr. Foot injured him. Henry once again attempts to fire him, but ends up getting punched again.; In Stewy the Dogboy, Stewy goes to school and has a big adventure on his first day.; June gets Mr. Foot a job at an airport to tell where and when the planes would land, but since all he does is sleep, he gets fired from this job.; In a music video called Why Does the Sun Shine?, a group of students are listening to a scientist talk about the sun. An animated sun makes its way to them and shines its brightest.; Henry and June go to tell Mr. Stockdale they can't fire Mr. Foot but they see that Stockdale also sleeps on the job. They get Mr. Foot a job as a network executive and he sleeps on the job just like everyone else does as the camera reveals on every staff member sleeping.; "Why Does the Sun Shine?" was performed by They Might Be Giants.
48	11	"Just Chillin'"	Chris Gilligan (Race Rabbit)	Will McRobb (Henry & June); Scott Fellows (Race Rabbit)	May 27, 2000
Henry and June feel that the show is about to be cancelled. So they decide to make it more adventurous and thrilling to give excitement to the viewers.; In Race Rabbit, Race's mission (to take the place of a secret top agent who is stuck on the road) is to deliver the secret ingredient to the peace offering until the chefs, especially the Boolies, cross between him.; After Mr. Stockdale reveals that the show has gone overbudget, they are reduced to run the show without color and animation.; In Action League Now!, The Chief was cursed by a fortune teller who he believes is a fraud, causing him to eat unhealthy foods and make him obese.; Because of the show's lack of a budget, the show's animation is now done using stick puppets.; In Dave, Son of Hercules, a pre-teen boy whose dad is the famous Greek legend Hercules is embarrassed by his father's destructive antics.; The animation in full color comes back when Mr. Stockdale pays for it all, but only because he likes "choo-choo" trains.; If you look carefully in the final scene however, you can see Mr. Foot driving the train that hits Henry and June.; The Dave, Son of Hercules cartoon is done by the same people who did Henry and June and is animated in the same Flash animation style.
