= KaBlam! =

American animated sketch comedy television series programming block

- The logo used from 1998 to 2000
- Genre: Sketch comedy Musical; Slapstick; Anthology series
- Created by: Bob Mittenthal; Will McRobb Chris Viscardi
- Starring: Noah Segan; Julia McIlvaine; Mischa Barton; Rick Gomez; Mo Willems; Danielle Judovits
- Opening theme: "Two-Tone Army" by The Toasters
- Ending theme: "Skaternity" by The Toasters (season 1) "Everything You Said Has Been a Lie" by The Toasters (seasons 2–4)
- Country of origin: United States
- Original language: English
- No. of seasons: 4
- No. of episodes: 48 (list of episodes)

Production
- Executive producers: Bob Mittenthal; Will McRobb; Chris Viscardi; Brian O'Connell; Albie Hecht
- Running time: 24 minutes
- Production companies: Nickelodeon Productions; Flying Mallet, Inc.; (season 4)

Original release
- Network: Nickelodeon
- Release: October 11, 1996 – May 27, 2000

Related
- Action League Now!; Angela Anaconda; All That

KaBlam! (stylized as KaBLaM!) is an American animated sketch comedy anthology television series that ran on Nickelodeon from October 11, 1996 to May 27, 2000, with repeats until November 2, 2001. The series was created by Robert (Bob) Mittenthal, Will McRobb, and Chris Viscardi. The show was developed to showcase alternative forms of animation that were more common in indie films and commercials. Each episode featured a collection of short films in different styles of animation, bridged by the characters Henry and June, who introduce the short animations.

The show first premiered on Friday nights as part of "More Nick", a block that extended Nickelodeon programming to 8:30pm on prime time. The show was a critical and commercial success. The show was last aired as a part of Nickelodeon's 'The Splat' programming block on October 8 and 9, 2016.

== Production ==
The segment creators include David Fain, Tim Hill, Stephen Holman, Emily Hubley, Mark Marek, Mike Pearlstein, Mo Willems, and Cote Zellers. The theme song and all of the original background music on the show was provided by the Moon Ska Stompers, a band that consists of King Django, Victor Rice, and members of The Toasters and The New York Ska-Jazz Ensemble. The bulk of the soundtrack was 30-second instrumental clips of songs from The Toasters' album D.L.T.B.G.Y.D., while the theme song itself is a shortened version of the Toasters song "2-Tone Army". Tracks from the Associated Production Music library were also utilized.

KaBlam! was the first show to be spun off of All That. It was pitched to Nickelodeon in 1994 and aired two years later. The pilot episode, "Your Real Best Friend", was created in 1995 and finished in 1996. One of the shorts, Mo Willems's The Off-Beats, was initially produced as standalone short films for Nickelodeon; but after it was nominated for a cable ACE award, more segments were produced for KaBlam!.

The show began production in 1995 and premiered on October 11, 1996. The show ran for four seasons, totaling 48 episodes plus 4 specials. (52 episodes total) The final episode, "Just Chillin", was broadcast on May 27, 2000. Kablam! was the final series to be greenlit (along with Hey Arnold!) while Geraldine Laybourne was still the president of Nickelodeon.

In 2010, Mark Marek, who created the Henry and June shorts, co-produced the Warner Bros. Animation-produced cartoon MAD. Julia McIlvaine, who voiced June, also appeared in a few episodes.

== Episodes ==
Season	Episodes	Originally released	
Season	Episodes	First released	Last released
1	13	October 11, 1996	January 31, 1997
2	13	September 26, 1997	January 16, 1998
3	11	September 4, 1998	March 12, 1999
4	11	December 31, 1999	May 27, 2000

=== Season 1 ===
The first season began with regular cartoons in their regular order. Sniz & Fondue, Action League Now!, Prometheus and Bob, and Life with Loopy. The Off-Beats was also another regular cartoon that occasionally filled in for "Life with Loopy" or Prometheus and Bob. Other cartoons such as Surprising Shorts, Lava!, Angela Anaconda, and once, The Louie and Louie Show aired. This is the only season in which a Sniz & Fondue short is included in every episode. Henry and June frequently had random short plots when the screen was shown on them and barely had one main plot, unlike future episodes. They had one whole plot in Comics for Tomorrow Today and What the Astronauts Drink. The opening animation starts out with a hawk crashing into the camera while the camera pans through a forest, dives underwater and travels to Egypt where Egyptians dance and the Great Sphinx swipes at the camera. The camera then heads to outer space showing two kids in a ride, the planets, stars, asteroids, and flying saucers. After the United States Capitol is destroyed by two saucers, it then pans to a Godzilla-like monster destroying a city. It then pans to an open street comic book store and lands on the KaBlam! comic book, featuring the Flesh, Stinky Diver, Sniz, Fondue, and Loopy on it. The book is then opened by Henry and June. After they dance, the episode starts. At the start of the theme, a voiceover of a man shouts "Wake up the masses!". As soon as he finishes, another man (Bert Pence) continues by saying, "Assume the crash position. Hold on tight, take a deep breath for a new kind of cartoon show. It's KaBlam! Where cartoons and comics collide. Now to take you inside and turn the pages, here are your hosts, Henry and June." The ending theme for most of the first season is The Toasters' song "Skaternity" (performed by the 'Moon Ska Stompers').

=== Season 2 ===
After seven more episodes of The Off-Beats, and one last episode of Surprising Shorts, they were officially taken out of KaBlam! One-off shorts were brought in such as Randall Flan's Incredible Big Top, The Girl with Her Head Coming Off, and The Adventures of Patchhead which did return in season 3. The Brothers Tiki appeared twice in season 2. Henry and June are now drawn differently and their voices are deeper. The opening theme to the show is barely changed. When the camera pans on the KaBlam! comic book, it is clearly seen that the cover is different. In place of the original characters, Thundergirl, Stinky Diver, Prometheus, Bob, Loopy, Sniz, and Fondue are seen. Also, Henry and June dance the macarena and then arm-in-arm, whereas in season one; it was just a bunch of random dances. The ending theme to the show is dramatically changed. Instead of Skaternity, it is "Everything You Said Has Been a Lie" by The Toasters (also performed by the 'Moon Ska Stompers'). After this season, the rating for KaBlam! went up from TV-Y to TV-Y7 for the remainder of the show's run. Though reruns during "Totally Twisted Telly" did revert back to TV-Y.

=== Season 3 ===
This season featured the last four episodes of Sniz & Fondue. JetCat and Race Rabbit are introduced and become minor shorts that appeared from time to time. The Adventures of Patchhead makes its second and final appearance. Music videos by James Kochalka called "Hockey Monkey" and "Pizza Rocket" also appear. Henry and June are drawn a little differently and their voices are slightly deeper. The opening theme is shortened and Henry and June have their own main plots now. In the episode "You May Already Be a...KaBlammer!", Lou Rawls is featured and voiced by the actual provider. The opening theme had a number of changes. After the camera comes up out of the water, it goes directly to the White House scene. After the Godzilla scene, the camera pans toward a school rather than the comic book stand. As it enters the classroom, the camera scares off a bird that was perched on a window. The camera pans by a teacher and through a number of students. It stops as it hits a student reading a KaBlam! comic book. On the cover of the comic book, it shows a child who is ecstatic. Henry and June then open the comic book, dance, and the episode starts. The announcer's line as he introduces the show is slightly changed. Instead of saying "Hold on tight, take a deep breath for a new kind of cartoon show", he says "Hold on tight, take a deep breath for a cartoon cramaganza!" The ending theme is not changed. This was also intended to be the final season until Nickelodeon renewed the show.

=== Season 4 ===
All the shorts (except Action League Now! and Angela Anaconda, which both spun off into their own shows) come to an end in the final season. Life with Loopy and Prometheus and Bob air their last seven episodes while JetCat and Race Rabbit air their last two and three episodes, respectively. Music videos by They Might Be Giants appear twice; they were "Why Does the Sun Shine?" and "Doctor Worm". One-off cartoons still appear: Fuzzball, Garbage Boy, Emmett Freedy, Stewy the Dog Boy, The Little Freaks, and The Shizzagee. One-off shorts are included in nearly every episode, excluding "A Nut in Every Bite!", "The KaBlair! Witch Project", and "Now With More Flava'". In every episode, Henry and June have their own main plot. In the episode "Sasquatch-ercise", Richard Simmons is featured and in the episode "Now With More Flava'", John Stamos and Busta Rhymes are featured; however, the stars did not voice their characters. The opening and ending themes are unchanged.

== Shorts ==
=== Regular shorts ===
Some of these shorts air more frequently and consistently than others.

==== Henry and June ====
The animated hosts of KaBlam! who turn the pages of a comic book (changes with each episode) to reveal the next cartoon or alternative animation, as well as being involved in subplots of their own between the shorts. These shorts were directed by Mark Marek.

Characters

- Henry and June are the co-hosts of KaBlam! and are depicted as comic book characters who emerge from the eponymous publication to act as the viewer's guides. The laid-back Henry is voiced by Noah Segan and the eccentric June is voiced by Julia McIlvaine.
- Mr. B. Foot is a giant Sasquatch who works on the show. His hobbies include sleeping, injuring Henry, and unexpectedly stealing the spotlight. However, under the rage and bluster, he is not a terrible creature; he never injures June. One episode reveals his ability as an accomplished drummer. He once spoke in the episode, "A Little Dab'll Do Ya".
- Mr. Fred Stockdale is the elderly network executive in charge of KaBlam! He acts rather senile, and will do anything to get KaBlam! good ratings—including firing someone or getting Henry into many physical accidents. His granddaughter Dawn says he has never been the same since Charlie's Angels was canceled.
- Henry's mother shows her love for her son in an exaggerated way. In "Cramming Cartoons Since 1627", her name is revealed to be Lois.
- Mr. Jimmy McGee appeared twice as a co-host of June on KaBlam! He gets in fights with Henry's mom. Appears to be a parody of Ed McMahon. His catchphrase is "Ahooga!". Voiced by show writer Robert Mittenthal.

==== Sniz & Fondue ====
Began: Season 1

Ended: Season 3

A pair of ferret roommates who often get on each other's nerves. Sniz is the younger kid ferret that is very hyperactive, and quite a troublemaker of the duo, while Fondue is the older teenage ferret, who is the nervous, yet intelligent one. There is also Snuppa and Bianca, Sniz and Fondue's roommates. From mid-1997 (around KaBlam's second season) until Sniz and Fondue ended production in late 1998 (around KaBlam!s third season). Due to its production company going to work on a television adaptation of Watership Down as well as creator Michael Pearlstein leaving the show out of frustration, Sniz & Fondue was taken off of the KaBlam! roster after season 3. The show was created by Michael Pearlstein. The pilot "Psyched for Snuppa" was produced in 1992 by Stretch Films and Jumbo Pictures, and was directed by John R. Dilworth, creator of Cartoon Network's Courage the Cowardly Dog. Unfortunately, John R. Dilworth, Jim Jinkins, and David Campbell were only involved in the pilot, but later all had no involvement with the rest of Sniz & Fondue when it became a part of KaBlam!. Reasons were that Doug creator Jim Jinkins and David Campbell have officially moved their jobs to Disney when they purchased Jumbo Pictures, and John R. Dilworth would later work on other projects, such as creating Courage the Cowardly Dog for Cartoon Network in 1999.

==== Action League Now! ====
Began: Season 1

Ended: Season 4

Filmed in "Chuckimation", in which the characters/props are moved by unseen hands or thrown from off-camera (interspersed with occasional stop motion animation). Action League Now! featured a group of superheroes, played by custom-made action figures, who fight crime in suburbia despite being total idiots. The four superheroes are The Flesh, Thundergirl, Stinky Diver, and Meltman. Considered to be the most successful KaBlam! short, it briefly became a spin-off series in 2001. Action League Now! is the only short to have a new episode with every showing of KaBlam! and it served as the centerpiece of KaBlam!. All of the characters on the shorts were voiced by personalities from radio station WDVE in Pittsburgh. The show was created by Robert Mittenthal, Will McRobb, and Albie Hecht.

==== Life with Loopy ====
Began: Season 1

Ended: Season 4

The life of a preteen boy Larry and his strange experiences with his imaginative and adventurous younger sister Loopy. The characters were animated with stop-motion puppet bodies, but their heads were created with metal and their features were magnetic. The show was created by British-born Stephen Holman, who previously created Joe Normal for MTV's Liquid Television, and later created Phantom Investigators on Kids' WB.

===== Characters =====
- Lupicia "Loopy" Cooper is an imaginative young girl with a knack for discovering surreal things, such as a world under the sofa. While she is often discouraged by Larry whenever she goes out to adventure, she does never let that stop her. Loopy is voiced by Danielle Judovits.
- Larry Cooper is Loopy's intelligent brother. Much like Lassie, Larry knows every detail of Loopy's adventures and narrates all of them, although he is not always there.
- Mrs. Cooper is Loopy and Larry's mother. She is more intelligent, but one episode reveals that she was a secret agent.
- Mr. Cooper is Loopy and Larry's father. He is more of the "laid-back" kind of guy, but one episode reveals he loses his temper when he receives bills.

==== Prometheus and Bob ====
Began: Season 1

Ended: Season 4

Also known as The Prometheus and Bob Tapes. A stop motion segment featuring the camera-recorded mission logs of Prometheus, an alien who comes to Earth attempting to teach a caveman, Bob, everyday things. From the use of fire to the act of ice skating, the result is usually a failure by the mischievous third cast member, who was a simple monkey. The show was created by Cote Zellers.

The introduction, done in a mock government format, describes the events as having occurred "900,000 years ago".

===== Characters =====
- Prometheus is a gaunt purple alien of advanced intelligence who speaks with a hollow sounding voice. He attempts to educate Bob, a caveman, as an experiment recorded on his remote-controlled camera. Prometheus is often injured in slapstick ways due to Bob's low intelligence.
- Bob is a babbling caveman. He once was completely covered in hair, but now has none because of a laser incident in the first clip. He also has a tendency to panic when frightened.
- The Monkey is a mischievous monkey who usually interferes with Prometheus' attempts to educate Bob, intentionally or otherwise. However, he has, on occasion, attempted to assist him.
- The Narrator recites the opening to the short, and the introduction to the short's "tape": "Tape [insert number here]", and finally, "End".

==== The Off-Beats ====
Began: Season 1

Ended: Season 2

A series that centers on a group of unpopular friends and their main rivals, a popular clique known as "The Populars". It originally aired during Nick's commercial breaks as stand-alone shorts to promote the premiere of KaBlam!, and it was also released on a 1996 Rugrats videotape, "Tommy Troubles". The show was created by Mo Willems, who later created Sheep in the Big City for Cartoon Network. The show was taken off the KaBlam! roster after season 2 because Mo Willems wanted to move over to Cartoon Network. However, The Off-Beats officially ended as a whole with a half-hour Valentine's Day special premiering in 1999, which was the last episode of the Off-Beats produced, as Mo Willems finally left Nickelodeon in 1999, and moved to Cartoon Network to create Sheep in the Big City in 2000.

=== Other shorts ===
- Surprising Shorts – The only short segment not to have recurring characters, these shorts usually had nothing to do with any previous shorts included on the show. This segment was exclusive to season 1, and was usually introduced by June pulling down Henry's pants, revealing his unflattering and garishly colored boxer shorts, hence the name.
  - Lava! – Originally titled in France as Guano!, these shorts typically featured animals partaking in cartoonish situations. These were edited out of international airings and future reruns for copyright issues by Vivendi, as they own Canal+, which co-produced the shorts, although the credits for the short may still be intact. Some of the original Guano! shorts contained more inappropriate elements than what was featured on the show. This segment appeared 4 times throughout season 1, and once in season 2, without the Surprising Shorts introduction.
  - Anemia and Iodine – One-off short. A cartoon displaying the misadventures of a Goth girl cat and her skateboarding, hyperactive best friend. It was created by alternative comics artist Krystine Kryttre and was directed by Robert Scull, most noted for his earlier work on Rocko's Modern Life, and shares visual similarities to that show as a result.
  - Angela Anaconda – A cutout-photo short that was later spun off into a stand-alone Canadian-animated series on the Fox Family Channel and was briefly rerun on Nickelodeon as well as Starz Kids and Family in the United States. This series is about a girl named Angela, who is a social outcast. She finds herself unpopular in school and always seems to be in the wrong place at the wrong time. Nanette, a faux-French girl who everyone loves and wants to be, always mocks Angela. During each episode, a poem-like story is narrated by Angela. She often gets her revenge on the antagonist of that particular episode, and more often imagines her revenge on the said antagonist in a highly exaggerated manner. Due to copyrights being co-held with Fox, the repeated KaBlam! shorts were banned from airing on Nicktoons. Some people believe this is the reason why any season/series DVD release can't become a reality. It appeared twice in season 1, with only the first appearance being introduced as a Surprising Short. Nanette, Johnny, and Mrs. Brinks had different voice actors in the original short.
- JetCat – A segment about a girl who has an identity as a cat superhero and flies around and saves her city. She says she "flies like a jet and fights like a cat." This is the only short that takes place outside of the comic book. It was featured as a comic in Nickelodeon Magazine for a short time. The music was composed by Rocko's Modern Life composer Pat Irwin. Created by Jay Stephens of Tutenstein fame.
- Race Rabbit – A live-action show about a romantic rabbit racer with a British accent who competes in races, but there is trouble along the way caused by the Boolies (Zit and Winston), his human enemies. Race Rabbit always wins the race, foiling the Boolies' plans. The only KaBlam! short was created in the United Kingdom and produced by Scott Fellows, who also created the later show Johnny Test.
- The Adventures of PatchHead – A live-action/animated segment about a barefoot kid with a watermelon for a hat and has a Southern Accent, stopping cheaters from winning competitions. This short is notable for featuring an early appearance by Nick Offerman.
- The Brothers Tiki – A puppetry/stop-motion/live-action segment about two extraterrestrials resembling mini tiki statues (equivalent to lawn gnomes), who land on Earth in a ship bearing a striking resemblance to a barbecue grill.
- Fuzzball – A non-recurring cartoon about a tomboy who tries to win back her father's trophy, which she broke. Created by Kevin Dougherty.
- The Louie and Louie Show – A short that appears only once on the show. Two neglected pets (a hamster and a chameleon), both named Louie, try to get some attention from their owners, who are all too busy playing with the family dog. This short was animated by Gary Baseman and directed by Tom McGrath. An early version, produced by Curious Pictures, also aired on Nickelodeon once by itself before KaBlam! premiered. The only KaBlam! short to have a "Nickelodeon presents" logo at the beginning. Louie the chameleon is voiced by James Belushi, and Louie the hamster is voiced by Billy West.
- Little Freaks – Another one-off cartoon. Three freaky superheroes try to stop a villain from controlling the world's fashion trends. When it aired on Nicktoons by itself, the "KaBlam! Presents" at the beginning was absent.
- The Shizzagee – One-off short about the only existing creature of its kind who resembles a coyote and lives with his owner named Brutus. It is the only computer-animated short to air on KaBlam!.
- The Girl With Her Head Coming Off – one-off short created by Emily Hubley.
- Randall Flan's Incredible Big Top – one-off short about a traveling circus ringmaster who must prevent his blue lion from performing in a town that hates blue lions.
- Untalkative Bunny – a one-off short that finally got a series in the early 2000s that, like Angela Anaconda, was produced by Canada's Teletoon. This short had previously aired on an episode of Cartoon Sushi.
- Garbage Boy – one-off short animated in a collage-based art style about a kid who can make items out of garbage.
- Emmett Freedy – one-off short animated in stop-motion where a kid gets a piece of cereal stuck in his hair that is mistaken for lice.
- Stewy the Dog Boy – one-off short about a dog who acts like a boy, similar to Disney's Teacher's Pet.
- Dave, Son of Hercules – a one-off short about a preteen boy who is the son of the Roman god Hercules and is embarrassed by him. This was animated by the same people who did the Henry & June segments.

There were also various They Might Be Giants music videos for the songs "Why Does the Sun Shine?" and "Doctor Worm". In addition, there were music videos of "Pizza Rocket" and "Hockey Monkey", created by James Kochalka. The former was also performed by The Zambonis. These were a mixture of live-action by Jesse Gordon and different animation styles, all produced and directed at The Ink Tank.

== Cancelled spin-off film ==
In 1998, a live-action Prometheus and Bob film was announced, with Harald Zwart to direct, Amy Heckerling and Twink Caplan producing and Joe Stillman as screenwriter. However, it was ultimately scrapped due to lack of interest. According to Cote Zellers, Chris Farley and David Spade were both considered until the former's death, and much of the script was reused for the 2010 film Gulliver's Travels.

== The Henry & June Show ==
A television special called The Henry & June Show was produced and aired on Nickelodeon in 1999. The first segment, "A Show of Their Own" aired, featured Henry and June with a studio audience and musical guests. The next segment was "Be True to Your School", where Henry and June attend school, and try their best to tackle hard subjects like "How to Look Your Best". It was originally intended as a pilot for a proposed animated series that would lead to spinning off the Henry & June segments of KaBlam! into a standalone, half-hour per episode show, although not in a comic book-like setting which KaBlam! was presented in. However, the attempt was unsuccessful so the pilot would only air once and was never shown again after it premiered.

== Blocks ==
A number of blocks were hosted by Henry and June for various Nicktoons including:

- Henry and June's Nicktoon Summer Jam – Aired from July 5, 1999 until the end of August 1999.
- 101% Whizbang! With Henry and June (AKA 101% Spooky Whizbang for Halloween 1999) – A block showing Nicktoons of a certain theme from September to October 1999.
- UPICK Friday/Monday - Aired from November 1999 until the summer of 2000
- Nicktoon World News with Henry and June – Aired in mid-2001 during SpongeBob's Nicktoon Summer Splash

== Broadcast history ==
KaBlam! first premiered on October 11, 1996, and ran for four seasons, totaling 48 episodes plus 4 specials. (52 episodes total) The final episode was broadcast on May 27, 2000. Reruns continued to air on Nickelodeon until November 2, 2001.

In 2002, Nicktoons was launched, and the channel began airing reruns of the program, though not all episodes were aired. During commercial breaks, various shorts from the show would play, not including any shorts involving Henry and June or music videos. In September 2005, Nicktoons revamped its branding and schedule, and removed several older series in the process, including KaBlam!. The "KaBlam! Presents:" shorts would continue to air until 2008 when the channel removed all of their intersitial programming for more commercial space. The program would only be seen one more time in December 2007 for Nicktoons Network's "100 Greatest Nicktoon Episodes" marathon, although it was not shown when Nick had a marathon of the first episodes of each Nicktoon on Thanksgiving Day 2007, despite having Henry and June on the cover of the now-defunct Nickelodeon Magazine.

KaBlam! was not seen on American television again until October 8–9, 2016, when Nickelodeon's 1990s-oriented block on TeenNick spotlighted the show and other classic Nicktoons for the brand's 25th anniversary.

Internationally, a French-language dub has been broadcast in France on television channel Game One (see Télévision Par Satellite), and other dubs of the show are on other Nickelodeon channels around Europe. It also was shown in the United Kingdom from 1997 to 2000 where the first episode was criticized for using the word "spastic" as by 1997 this word was considered grossly offensive in the UK and Ireland. In Poland, it aired from 1999 to 2001 on Fantastic. The show was aired in Estonia as well. The show was aired on YTV in Canada.

== Reception ==
KaBlam! mainly received positive reviews from television critics and audiences. Rotten Tomatoes review aggregator has an approval rating of 100% in season 1 based on five reviews, with an average rating of 8.1/10.

Emily Ashby of Common Sense Media rated this show four stars out of five, saying that it "deserves bonus points for creativity with its inclusive animation style that makes it a lot of fun to watch." She highlighted the show's Action League Now! segment as "one of the show's most memorable segments." Ray Richmond of Variety said that "the idea of a kids' show using cel, paper-cut, clay, computer, pixilated live-action, and stop-motion animation to fill a half-hour is in itself revolutionary. If the quality of 'Kablam!' is initially inconsistent, it's easy to forgive an enterprise that aims its arrows in so many ambitious directions."

In 2016, Screen Rant ranked at 25th of the "Nickelodeon's 25 Best TV Shows Ever" in the list.

== Home media and streaming ==
Only one episode ("Won't Crack or Peel" – 3D broadcast version) was ever released on VHS, as part of a promotion with Tombstone Pizza. There are no other home video releases. Nickelodeon insiders have stated that this is due to licensing issues regarding individual segments. Additionally, the show would not be included on a streaming service until VRV added KaBlam! on August 28, 2018. In June 2021, select episodes of KaBlam! have been made available to stream on Paramount+, and on Amazon Prime Video through a Paramount+ subscription. As of 2024, the series is missing 11 episodes (5 of season 1, 2 of season 2, and 4 of season 4) on the service due to these restrictions. In January 2026, Paramount+ removed all episodes of KaBlam from the platform due to a content purge, which also included its spinoff Action League Now.

== See also ==
- Action League Now!
- All That
- Angela Anaconda
- Cartoon Planet
- Cartoon Sushi
- JetCat
- Liquid Television
- The Off-Beats
- Oh Yeah! Cartoons
- Random! Cartoons
- Raw Toonage
- Robot Chicken
- Sniz & Fondue
- TripTank
- What a Cartoon!
