= Toad Patrol =

Children's animated television series

- Genre: Animated series Adventure; Fantasy; Comedy drama
- Created by: George Sarson; Peggy Sarson
- Developed by: Rob Hudnut; Thomas LaPierre; Funbag Animation Studios; Edward Sarson Productions
- Written by: Patricia Lewis; Clive Endersby
- Directed by: Nelson Shin (season 1); Jerry Popowich
- Voices of: Dawn Ford; Terrence Scammell; Sonja Ball; Nancy Neilson; Neil Shee; Rick Jones; Bryn McAuley; Brady Moffatt; Michael O'Reilly; Long John Baldry
- Composers: Ian Tamblyn (season 1); Andrew Huggett (season 2)
- Country of origin: Canada
- No. of seasons: 2
- No. of episodes: 26

Production
- Executive producers: Peggy Sarson; George Sarson; Firdaus Kharas (season 2)
- Producer: Rick Morrison
- Production companies: Toadbag Productions; Edward Sarson Productions; Vision Entertainment (US); Funbag Animation Studios; Helix Animation; Universal Pictures International (season 1); AKOM (season 1); RME LLC. (season 2) (US)

Original release
- Network: Teletoon
- Release: October 2, 1999 – November 24, 2002

Toad Patrol is a Canadian animated series created by George and Peggy Sarson. It premiered on October 2, 1999, on Teletoon (now Cartoon Network) in Canada and on September 7, 2002, on Toon Disney in the United States.

Although it was aimed at children, it found a following among preteens, teens and young adults because the fairly youthful and light-hearted appearance of the show enveloped some rather dark undertones and backgrounds. The story was in unofficial development since 1985, officially beginning when the creators started selling Mistle Toad chocolates and cream pops to raise money.

Years later, Toad Patrol was animated in Korea, AKOM (first season) and India, UTV Toons (additional production services, second season only), although much in-betweening was done in Canada at Funbag and Helix studios. It later aired on the French-language Télétoon as La Petite Patrouille, and on the TeleFutura (now UniMás) Spanish-language network as Patrulla de Sapitos. It also aired in Italy on Rai 2 as La pattuglia dei ranocchi.

== Story ==
The story is about a group of eight young "Toadlet" siblings and their struggle for survival in The Great Forest.

The Ancients are quite powerful and knowledgeable in shamanistic like magic. According to legend; they had created Toad Hollow, left many symbols of their existence behind and had eventually disappeared. Now, for unknown reasons, the Toads have to abandon the forest and migrate to Toad Hollow. Toad Hollow is basically a giant haven, home to many Toads. The only way to enter Toad Hollow is a gateway known as the Fairy Ring. Or at least, this is the only way that will prevent one from becoming a Toadstool after the ring closes. This portal of sorts opens and closes in random areas of the forest annually, and any who miss the Ring end up stranded or turn into a toadstool.

The main characters are late-born Toadlets who missed the great migration. Unable to figure out what to do, they are greeted by a wandering Toad sage named Mistle Toad. He tells them about the Fairy Ring and how to find it. It is not known exactly where it is because the location changes every year. It is revealed shortly after that the youngest of the eight toadlets, Panther Cap, has the ability to hear what certain "Lightning Oaks" (called Thunder Trees by the toadlets) are saying and can also tune into these trees telepathically with the use of an acorn.

Along their journey, every member of the group develops a special skill which they use to contribute to the group's survival. They also meet Earth Star, a young Toadlet musician who was part of a previous group of Toadlets who failed to find the Fairy Ring in time and all turned into Toadstools.

The series lasted two seasons, 13 episodes each. The first follows the Toadlets as they find the Fairy Ring. In the second season, when in Toad Hollow, Panther Cap hears Mistle Toad calling out for help. Eventually after telling the others, they set out to find and rescue him.

== Production ==
This series was first realized by George and Peggy Sarson in 1985. He created the character of Mistle Toad back then and penned a series of short stories about Toad Tunnels, tunnels dug in some areas of the world for groups of toads who migrate. The tunnels act as a way to give the Toads a safe passageway past freeways and roads, as this had been known to destroy whole groups of migrating toads before the invention of the tunnels. George found the perilous journey of the toads fascinating and created a story about it.

Good Coulthart, alongside Don Spencer and Rick Morrison, opened Funbag Animation Studios in 1993. Funbag would continue to produce animation until January 2007.

Edward Sarson Productions and Funbag Animation Studios, founded in 1993 teamed up to form a joint venture called Toadbag Productions in 1995. Their first project was Toad Patrol. Sarson’s licensing program also included partnerships with companies like Flowers Bakeries, Beatrice, and Hallmark. Curtis Crawford, a Canadian-born director known for his work on Nickelodeon's Doug, had joined Funbag as the director of creative development for the project.

The Family Channel and Baton were on board in support of the first 13 episodes and Funbag owned 50% of the project.

Funbag Animation started production on Toad Patrol in July 1997, after having spent over $500,000 within the previous year on computerizing its colour system and ink and paint. The show eventually went into production in winter 1997. Pre-production, as well as three initial scripts, central design pack, and voice casting already finished by this time. After linking a deal with Teletoon which commissioned the first season as early as January 1997 for its first batch of original programming., for a scheduled for launch in September 1998.

In 2002, the sale of broadcast rights to Disney in the US was announced, along with the production of a second season. A show sponsor page had stated that 13 additional episodes of the series were in production as of 2005.

The first season was produced by AKOM Production Company, while the second season was produced by RME Animation Studios. Slippery Jack is voiced by Brady Moffatt in the first season and not the second season because he is uncredited.

In 2005, Toronto’s Portfolio Entertainment were the new owners of Toad Patrol. In September 2007, Toad Patrol was then aired on Malaysia’s RTM network, after securing a deal with Portfolio Entertainment. In February 2009, Portfolio Entertainment sold the airing rights of Toad Patrol to Minimax, which aired the show in within Central Europe.

Run for the Toad, a marathon organized by Peggy and George Sarson, used characters from the series for branding and had special events for children where episodes of the show were aired in both English and French. The final Run for the Toad event was held in October 2019.

== Episodes ==
=== Season 1: Chapters 1–13 (1999–2000) ===
No. overall	No. in season	Title	Written by	Original release date
1	1	"One for All"	Clive Endersby	October 17, 1999
After eight tadpoles become toadlets, they find themselves alone in a strange and dangerous forest. Immediately threatened by a hungry snake named Erebus, Beauty Stem says that they must all stay together and Fur Foot tries to lead them. Elf Cup and Shaggy Mane want to go off and play, while Panther Cap finds himself drawn away from the others by voices that only he can hear. Fur Foot, Beauty Stem, Puff Ball, Oyster, Slippery Jack and Panther Cap soon begin a journey together. They immediately face danger in the form of rushing rapids and then when Panther Cap goes off to follow the voices and stop the whispering, Beauty Stem decides to accompany him. Panther Cap cannot go with Beauty Stem because the whispers are getting stronger. Meanwhile, Elf Cup and Shaggy Mane find themselves in danger from a "wind rider", not even knowing that the others are headed their way to try to bring them back into the fold. Shaggy Mane fell down and trapped in the ropes. Fur Foot helps Shaggy Mane to free him. Eventually, all (except Panther Cap) are reunited and meet up with a wise toad named Mistle-Toad, who warns them that they have missed the great migration. They must find the location of the Fairy Ring by "listening to Panther Cap", guided by the voices that Panther Cap suffers a non-stop hearing from the Thunder Trees, or face becoming trapped as toadstools.
2	2	"The Giver of Names"	Clive Endersby	October 24, 1999
Panther Cap acquires an acorn, which when spun like a top, can lead them to the next Thunder Tree. Shaggy Mane's antics slow the Toad Patrol as he disturbs a nest of wasps, gets caught in the headlights of an oncoming 'Rumble Crusher', and loses a close encounter with Cleopatra the Skunk. While introducing Earth Star, he discovered that he's the only toadlet who came back after he turned into a toadstool. Feeling useless, Shaggy Mane runs away, until Cleopatra and Earth Star, convinces him that he is a vital member of the Toad Patrol.
3	3	"The Fire"	Mary Crawford, Alan Templeton	October 10, 1999
On the way to the next Thunder Tree, a friendly 'Tunnel Toad' guides the Toad Patrol through a Toad Tunnel under the highway where they wait in helpless suspense for Fur Foot, Puff Ball and Elf Cup who are trapped in a fire that threatens their new friend, Morton the Turtle. Puff Ball removes a twig from a Thunder Tree from a beaver dam to extinguish the fire. He then obtains it.
4	4	"The Crystal Caverns"	Bruce Robb	October 2, 1999
Finding themselves going in circles on a rainy night, the Toad Patrol once again narrowly dodges Erebus and then run into Earth Star, who advises them to use pathfinds to mark their way. It gets dark and rainy, so Earth Star calls in the help of a salamander, to help the toadlets find a shelter for the night. They stop to rest in some ancient caverns and Puff Ball takes first watch and ends up falling asleep. The toadlets are soon washed away in a flood, but manage to escape into a drier area of the caverns. There, they find mysterious red glows (crystals) and soon start behaving furiously. Puff Ball, feeling that the situation is all his fault, goes off to look for a way to help things. He falls asleep again and is found by Newt. As Newt advises Puff Ball in the use of the talking wet and how dangerous the red glows are, Puff Ball makes him a hard promise in order to gain his help. Meanwhile, the toadlets make a startling discovery about the red glows. Puff Ball uses his hammer to crack the red crystals and he failed because water is required to dissolve the crystals. As the water flows on the entire cavern, it demolishes the crystals and got out. Puff Ball, having to keep his promise to Newt, tells the others to go on without him. But Newt turns down the offer and lets Puff Ball go with the others. Outside of the crystal caverns, Panther Cap found the Thunder Tree that he is looking for.
5	5	"Scooped"	Katherine Sandford	October 3, 1999
The toadlets are all outside playing leaptoad. Oyster is having a particularly good time, but ignores Slippery Jack's warnings of possible danger out in the open. She ends up being scooped into a bucket by a 'little stomper' and when Slippery Jack joins in a rescue attempt, he meets the same fate. The toadlets scramble for a way to rescue them. They encounter a tunnel toad named Daphne who tells them that no toadlet has ever returned from being "scooped" and that they must go on about their journey. Refusing to accept this, they learn of the rumblecrusher rest area from Daphne and latch onto it as their only hope. Back in the camper where they've been transported, Oyster and Slippery Jack manage to escape from the aquarium they were placed in. They then meet up with two vaudevillian mice, Rosencrantz and Guildenstern, who school them on the wonders of living with the stompers. Not wanting to turn into toadstools, Oyster and Slippery Jack convince the two mice to help them. Oyster and Slippery Jack are saved by the stomper after reunited by the toadlets.
6	6	"The Stay Away Place"	Bruce Robb	November 21, 1999
The toadlets are heading towards the next Thunder Tree. They slide into it, but also find themselves facing the Stay Away Place – a large toadstool graveyard of sorts. Earth Star's there and he explains that this is the place where he and his friends turned to toadstools, having just missed the Fairy Ring. Despite the Thunder Tree's advice to continue forward, the toadlets decide to go around this scary area. They come to large cliff and find Mistle Toad in imminent danger of falling to the bottom. As the toadlets work to keep him from falling, Panther Cap and Beauty Stem make their way back through the Stay Away Place to tell Earth Star to get out of the Thunder Tree before it will break by the thunder. There, they find help from some unexpected friends and also face some of their deepest fears.
7	7	"Trojan Duck"	Alex Galatis	November 28, 1999
The Toad Patrol saves Barnaby, an egotistical frog, from the drooling jaws of a hunter's dog and then uses a duck decoy to cross a marsh under the ever watchful eye of Medea.
8	8	"Night Fright"	Jed MacKay	December 5, 1999
Elf Cup explores the dark forest in hopes of encountering Earth Star, unaware of the dangers lurking. and when She is cornered by a Fox, Elf Cup sees something unusual...
9	9	"Trapped"	Rick Jones, John Handforth	December 12, 1999
Digger, a mole who looks out for number one, overhears the Patrol's Plans and tells Erebus. Erebus traps Panther Cap and waits for the other toadlets to come and rescue him. After waiting for too long, Digger rescues Panther Cap.
10	10	"Bird's Eye View"	Mary MacKay-Smith	December 19, 1999
As the stomper moves the bird house to the tree, The Toad Patrol are trapped in a bird house when an Extravagant woodpecker steals Panther Cap's hat and his acorn. With the help of an Indolent porcupine, they circumvent a couple of boisterous flying squirrels and plead for the return of the hat and the precious acorn that points them to the great Thunder Tree.
11	11	"The Cure"	John Handforth	February 12, 2000
Beauty Stem falls ill when she takes a shower with polluted water. She faints while marching. Mistle Toad, Earth Star and the Toad Patrol are on the quest to search for the cure and track through the night to reach an Ancient healer in time to save Beauty Stem's life.
12	12	"The Temple of Bufonidae"	Richard Kaulbars	February 13, 2000
While exploring an abandoned temple of the Ancients, The Toad Patrol are trapped by Belisarius, the leader of a bat pack. The temple is inside the Thunder Tree. You may find the bat kidnapping Slippery Jack and putting him in the sand. Mistle Toad and Puff Ball finds Toad Scratches while the others are exploring.
13	13	"The Fairy Ring"	Clive Endersby	February 19, 2000
The final chapter of the first season is about to begin! After visiting the Thunder Tree, The Toad Patrol must get to the fairy ring in time and all that's left is to enter it to reach Toad Hollow. They face villainous practical obstacles in the final race to make it before the yellow ball goes down and they all become toadstools. After rescuing Earth Star from Erebus and a muddy pit, the toadlets face a large rift between them and the final path to Toad Hollow. Badgered by both Medea and Erebus along the way, Panther Cap and Earth Star find themselves trapped in the cracks. There, they discuss why Earth Star wants to stay in the forest and what exactly happened between him and his friends. Meanwhile, the other toadlets face a desperate decision as to what to do to save their friends, while still making it to the Fairy Ring in time. Fortunately, Mistle Toad is also around to help out. In the end, Everyone makes it to the Fairy Ring, including Earth Star, who gets Panther Cap to get to the portal in time. Mistle Toad congratulates the Toad Patrol, as Their quest is complete. Before the screen cuts to black, Madea lifts Erebus into a sky.

=== Season 2: Chapters 14–26 (2002) ===
No. overall	No. in season	Title	Written by	Original release date
14	1	"A Cry For Help"	Clive Endersby	September 7, 2002
The toadlets are having a blast in Toad Hollow, where everything is fun and there are no dangers to worry about. When in Toad Hollow, The Toad Patrol will never have to worry about turning into toadstools. Panther Cap, for his part, is enjoying a little conversation at Earth Star and some nice relaxation time because he's tired from all the adventures. It's then he was hearing from Mistle Toad, calling out for help, who is in danger, urging him to leave Toad Hollow and go back to the Great Forest on a rescue mission and "make the big climb". Though some toadlets are reluctant to leave Toad Hollow, helping Mistle Toad is too important. Elf Cup, Shaggy Mane, Oyster and Slippery Jack are asked to stay behind. They decide to go along anyway and gone for backup as the toadlets find themselves in a radically different forest covered with thick white. Panther Cap uses the acorn to find the Thunder Tree, but failed because of the Toad Tunnel. While inside the ice temple, the access is blocked by Erebus, when he is sleeping as Panther Cap puts his hat on his nose and sees the audiences staring at Panther Cap without his hat for 2 seconds. After exiting the tunnel, he successfully entered the Thunder Tree. After hearing, it says "cross the thick wet to make it to the big climb". There, they soon face old and new enemies but find that they're still strong when they stick together. While reuniting the others, they evade a white monster. The big snowball will hurt the white monster and will go away.
15	2	"The Healer"	Katherine Sandford	September 8, 2002
The Toad Patrol continues their journey to rescue Mistle Toad, coming upon a big block of thick wet, a frozen lake. They have some rough encounters with rumblecrushers and snowmobiles, but also encounter a new friend, Loki the otter, who helps them to get across the thick wet. Unfortunately, Panther Cap lost his hat and suddenly falls through a hole into the chilly wet and got drowned. Fur Foot dives to save him, but he was cold and ends up being Loki who rescues him. He's fallen into a coma and the toadlets all find a toad tunnel. While searching for a way to help Panther Cap, most of the Toad Patrol is trapped outside, while Beauty Stem is inside with Slippery Jack and the sleeping Panther Cap. She must rely on intuition and a friendly visitor to help him out.
16	3	"Winter Woes"	Ross Wilson	September 15, 2002
Fur Foot felt some snow, a crystal appears. The others evaded a crow and scares him away. When a strong fierce blizzard blows Fur Foot, Beauty Stem and Puff Ball across a field, Elf Cup assumes responsibility for the others. A hailstorm, a ride on a stomper's snowshoe and a narrow escape from an angry badger, convinces her that leadership is not an easy task.
17	4	"The Castle of the Ancients"	Rick Kaulbars	September 22, 2002
The Toad Patrol has reached the destination where Mistle-Toad is located and his cry for help is originated. Oyster manages to convince a "finder" to help out. Although the Toad Patrol has to threaten him in a way to get him to help out, its only because he won't believe them when they tell him that they don't mean any harm. The way up the big climb is harder, but by working together and trusting each other, they make it. Once there, they find the Castle of the Ancients. There, it's another tough challenge to rescue and free Mistle-Toad by placing him on the hot steam so the ice will melt, who has some very important information including a flashback of his cry for help. After rescuing Mistle-Toad, Fur Foot, Elf Cup and Puff Ball leave the forest and go back to Toad Hollow.
18	5	"Castaway"	Nancy Neilson	September 29, 2002
Fur Foot, Puff Ball and Elf Cup are continuing their journey to Toad Hollow and find themselves forced to cross a melting pond. Meanwhile, Mistle Toad's group has received a new order from Beauty Stem, to have some fun! It seems that Panther Cap feels upset about not being able to make out the voices in his head, so it's hoped he might feel better by having fun and help him take his mind off his worries. As they have fun with icicles that work like funhouse mirrors, the others find themselves in a tight spot when a flat swimmer cracks the ice, stranding them on an island. At various points, they all want to give up, but find the strength to go on. As they struggle to survive and find a way off, Panther Cap senses their danger. He's upset at not being able to do anything to solve the problem, but then finds himself face-to-face with the Ancients, chanting a strange incantation that may help him get the voices back and stop Medea from getting in their way. After this, Loki appears.
19	6	"Lost & Found"	Blair Mackintosh	October 6, 2002
Shaggy Mane has been having some fun boarding, but Beauty Stem tells him to knock it off and help Panther Cap. He tries to board his way to Panther Cap, but ends up taking Panther Cap for a wild ride. The two end up lost, but receive some important help from The Outsider. She shows Panther Cap how he can use his special gift in a way he knew was impossible. Meanwhile, Fur Foot, Puff Ball and Elf Cup are still on their way to return to Toad Hollow and find Earth Star. As they're once again threatened by the flying menace of Medea, they receive some unexpected assistance in the form of a woofer (dog.) They're then faced with a difficult decision as to whether they should leave him behind to make haste, or try to help him out. As if that's not enough, the increasing temperature has awakened an old nemesis.
20	7	"Choices"	Patricia Lewis	October 13, 2002
Puff Ball, Elf Cup and Fur Foot are getting closer to Toad Hollow, while Mistle Toad has found some new Toad Scratches back at the caves. Slippery Jack is too tired to help, so Oyster offers to come up with a plan all her own. When she's told it's too risky, she grows upset and contemplates trying the dangerous plan all on her own. Meanwhile, the Toad Hollow group comes upon a frog named Calypso. Wary of her due their past experience from Barnaby, they try to hide from her at first what they're after. But when they find themselves getting nowhere fast, they find that they must overcome their prejudice. Later, another toadlet faces a deep, personal fear in deciding to help out the Toad Patrol.
21	8	"Invasion"	John Handforth	October 20, 2002
While Earth Star and his group return to the temple, the temple group has found themselves in a bit of a jam. They're being chased by two vicious weasels named Snout and Ollie who will do anything to catch them and to torture them. They come up with a number of clever plans to escape, but the dim-witted weasels manage to keep tracking them anyway. After this group gives them the shake for good, they turn their attention on Earth Star's group. Meanwhile, the other group has fallen into a hole where they meet up with a turtle and make some amazing discoveries about just why the Ancients stopped playing the music and the toads and toadlets were turned into toadstools.
22	9	"The Lost Symphony"	Katherine Sandford	October 27, 2002
Earth Star plays the ancient tune on the five giant icicles but fails to change the toadstools back into Toadlets. Learning that two more instruments must be found and played together, the Toad Patrol make a hair-raising descent down the big climb on a home made elevator and set out to search the valley before the spring warmth melts the icicles. As spring is coming and the icicles melt, the cure will be ineffective.
23	10	"Good Day"	Jed MacKay	November 3, 2002
The toadlets are all looking forward to a good day, but they find that various circumstances are turning things bad. Medea is out and about and what's worse --- the thicksicles are beginning to melt. Furfoot and Elf Cup are trying to cross the big wet and decide to let Panther Cap sleep in. Unfortunately, he gets chased out, but then his life is saved by a new friend, a honker (goose) who's named Artemis, but goes by the name of Artie. Seemingly obsessed with the idea of saving lives, Artie decides to come along with Panther Cap to help Furfoot and Elf Cup, but makes sure to avoid his mother, for fear she might make him eat his new friend. Meanwhile, Earth Star is in despair over the possibility of Beauty Stem staying in the forest to become a healer. She does her best to convince him that she has to follow her heart. Finally, Oyster and Puff Ball are guarding the thicksicles that are starting to melt. They work to find a way to turn a bad situation to their advantage so that the thicksicles can stay cool.
24	11	"The Sacrifice"	Patricia Lewis	November 10, 2002
The toadlets are all continuing their journey to play the thicksicles, but it continues to be a hard journey. While climbing, Earth Star's hand is numb, while walking, he fell down. Meanwhile, Panther Cap begins to experience head pains as he becomes upset and worries when he believe that he lost his ability to listen to the Thunder Trees. They tried to convince him, otherwise there's no use. Fur Foot and Elf Cup devise a plan to show Panther Cap that he still has his ability and make him believe that he can hear them once more. They tried few attempts on him. Meanwhile, Puff Ball and Oyster are troubled by a strange creature scuttling around the caves where the thicksicles are. It turns out to be Sigmund, the guardian of the toadstools, with an important message about one of their own. She has a staff with her name in it. This has a direct effect on Mistle Toad, Beauty Stem, Slippery Jack and Earth Star, who are having a hard journey. They end up disturbing a rat named Orpheus, who tricks them after they help him out, causing Earth Star to attempt saving his friends with a risky plan. After that, he transforms into a toadstool.
25	12	"The Bridge"	Ross Wilson	November 17, 2002
Without Earth Star, knowing that they must all play the music at the same time to turn the toadstools back into toadlets. Now, the Toad Patrol continues their journey with the absence of Fur Foot, Elf Cup and Panther Cap. Panther Cap was continuing to hear from the Thunder Trees one last time but find themselves in a dilemma when Fur Foot is trapped in a hole underneath a log ended up like a rope. They find some help from an old friend while journeying where they were when they got trapped by Erebus. Speaking of Erebus, he's found Mistle Toad and his group trapped underneath a stomper crossing and is doing his best to harass them. That's when Barnaby arrives and works with Shaggy Mane to provide a unique solution to the problem. Meanwhile, Oyster is upset about not being able to go out and pick some smellies, but spending some time with Sigmund, the guardian of the toadstools, cheers her up. Elf Cup and Panther Cap free Fur Foot with the help of Daphne to continue along.
26	13	"Journey's End"	Clive Endersby	November 24, 2002
Both old friends and enemies are out in full force as the toadlets make the final journey to find and play the instruments in the hopes of turning all of the forests' toadstools back into toadlets. Oyster and Puff Ball find themselves in a continuous battle with Medea to prevent the thicksicles from being destroyed. Oyster finds that a talk with Sigmund and some singing helps to calm her down. Meanwhile, Mistle Toad's group hooks up with Loki, who shows them that the strum-along instrument they're looking for is inside a wet drop. He then helps them with a clever ploy to get rid of Erebus, who had decided to set up camp and then go on a toadlet hunt after the music was played. Finally, Fur Foot, Panther Cap and Elf Cup meet up with Calypso Frog. She shows them how to reach the tooter instrument they're looking for, but they realize that it's broken, which is likely why the Ancients stopped playing the music. It becomes a race against time to find an alternate instrument, as Mistle Toad waits until the yellow ball rises again to give the signal. The episode ends when Erebus gives the audience a final speech.

== Home releases ==
Three DVDs were released in 2005, each one containing three episodes.

Name	Release date	Episodes	Contains
The World of Toad Patrol	April 26, 2005	1 - 3	"One For All" "The Giver of Names" "The Fire"
Toad Patrol: The Crystal Caverns	July 26, 2005	4 - 6	"The Crystal Caverns" "Scooped" "The Stay Away Place"
Toad Patrol: Toadlets to the Rescue	December 6, 2005	7 - 9	"Trojan Duck" "Night Fright" "Trapped"
