= Mole Sisters =

British-Canadian animated series

Mole Sisters is an animated series released on March 3, 2003. It teaches preschoolers to respect the natural world around them. It is based on the book series written and illustrated by Roslyn Schwartz, and follows the adventures of two moles as they explore their environment. The series is produced by Funbag Animation Studios and Helix Animation. The show was commended for not only teaching respect for the environment, but for teaching respect for those around people, which is demonstrated in the sisters' relationship and the way they help each other throughout the series.

== Episodes ==
Episode 1

Maddy and Frankie, two mole sisters, lived in a cozy burrow beneath an old oak tree. But one day, a strange chill seeped into their home, and whispers of a "bed full of cold aircon secrets" reached their ears. Driven by the need for a safe haven, they packed their tiny bags and set off on an adventure.

Their journey led them through a maze of tunnels, each colder than the last, until they stumbled upon a massive, dark space—the underside of a house! Here, strange metal contraptions hummed and blew icy gusts. This was it, the land of cold aircon secrets. Maddy, the braver of the two, led the way, her nose twitching, trying to find a warm spot amidst the machinery.

They eventually discovered a hidden nook behind a large, insulated pipe. It was surprisingly snug and shielded from the harshest winds. Here, amidst the cold secrets, Maddy and Frankie built a new home, lining it with soft moss and forgotten bits of fabric they scavenged. They learned to navigate the cold, finding warmth in each other's company and the joy of a safe, secret haven.

Episode 2 Maddy and Frankie snuggled deeper into the couch cushions, the hum of the air conditioner a constant lullaby. It wasn't their cozy burrow beneath the oak tree, but it was safe, for now. The human giants who roamed this strange land called it a "living room," and the couch was their temporary haven. Maddy, the elder sister, always took the edge, shielding Frankie from any drafts.

They had ventured into a cold, mysterious world seeking refuge from the rumbling monsters that had invaded their peaceful home. The monsters, with their screeching metal and blinding lights, had left their burrow in ruins. Now, the sisters were on a quest to find a new safe haven, a place where they could rebuild their lives and feel the warmth of the earth beneath their paws once more.
