= Sniz & Fondue =

- Season 1 title card
- Created by: Mike R. Brandon
- Starring: Rick Gomez; Oscar Riba; John Walsh; Monica Lee Gradischek; Mike R. Brandon; Nandor Nevai; Jerry Nelson; Jim Cummings
- Opening theme: "Toys for Boys" (season 1)
- Composer: David Campbell
- Country of origin: United States
- No. of episodes: 23 (and 1 pilot)

Production
- Running time: 5-7 minutes

Original release
- Network: Nickelodeon (1996-1997)
- Release: October 7, 1996 – October 4, 1997

Sniz & Fondue is a series of animated shorts originally appearing on the first three seasons of the animation-anthology series KaBlam! on the American cable television network Nickelodeon.

== Premise ==
The series is about the day-to-day lives and zany hijinks of two ferret roommates, Sniz and Fondue. Sniz is hyperactive and playfully impulsive, traits that result in trouble for himself and his roommate, Fondue. Sniz sports a lime-green Mohawk haircut. Fondue is generally nervous as a result of Sniz's rambunctiousness, which results in him being on his guard. Fondue sports a blue chef's hat. They live with two other roommates, Snuppa and Bianca.

== Production ==
Created by Mike R. Brandon (credited as Michael Pearlstein at the time of the cartoon's premiere), Sniz & Fondue was inspired and derived from characters of his short-lived comic series for a small comic book publishing company Northstar called "Puppy Action!". He later received a phone call from Linda Simensky, the head of Nickelodeon's programming at the time, who had found the first issue of "Puppy Action!" and asked him if he'd be interested in creating a pilot for a potential series. So, he produced the 1992 pilot "Psyched for Snuppa" by Stretch Films and Jumbo Pictures, under the self-proclaimed disliked direction of John R. Dilworth, creator of Cartoon Network's Courage the Cowardly Dog. Although the pilot was passed by Nickelodeon in favor of Trash-O-Madness, the pilot of Rocko's Modern Life, the Nickelodeon team liked Sniz and Fondue so much that they spun the characters into a series of segments for KaBlam!. John R. Dilworth, Jim Jinkins, and David Campbell were only involved in the pilot and had no involvement with the rest of Sniz & Fondue when it became a part of KaBlam! (Jim Jinkins and David Campbell had officially moved their jobs to Disney Enterprises when they purchased Jumbo Pictures). Dilworth was asked by the board to direct the Sniz & Fondue series in New York City, but he declined due to other interests.

Brandon was in charge of writing, storyboarding, character designing, creating the title cards and doing additional voices. The first season oversaw the animation at Israeli animation studio Pitchi Poy Animation Productions, which Brandon despised due to how off-model the characters ended up being. They also mostly used stock music from Associated Production Music. The cue used for the show's title card was "Toys for Boys", composed by Boris Schoska. Eventually for the second and third season, they switched the oversea animation to Funbag Animation Studios in Canada with most of the animation and writing done in New York City, as well as going back to using original music cues with new title cards. Originally, Viacom was considering having the second and third season be animated at Spümcø in California, but Brandon convinced them to have it done closely to his friends and family in New York. One of the show's trademarks is that the characters (mostly Sniz) often sing or quote lyrics from real-life songs, such as in the episode "Stuntbike Sniz", where Sniz said to Fondue the main chorus of the song "You're the Inspiration" as well as the episode "Crustacean Sensations" where Sniz was singing The Bee Gees song "Night Fever" while wandering in the woods.

The series came to an end as Brandon decided to leave the series out of frustration due to having to do most of the production work, as well as Funbag being on the verge of going bankrupt while working on a TV adaptation for Watership Down. He was offered a half-hour spin-off, but due to his departure the offer was given to Stephen Hillenburg for SpongeBob SquarePants. The final episode, "Hosed!", ultimately with Brandon not involved in any way, aired within the season 3 KaBlam! episode "It's All in the Wrist".

== Characters ==
- Sniz Bronkowski — Sniz is a crazy little ferret who gets himself into trouble on a daily basis. Luckily, Fondue has ways to bail Sniz and himself out of ordeals. His hairstyle is always a green mohawk, except for one episode in which he went bald due to using too much hair gel. Sniz was voiced by Rick Gomez (credited as "R.H. Gomez") Originally, Sniz was supposed to be voiced by John Walsh, but the Nickelodeon team decided on Gomez instead.
- Squeaky Fondue — Fondue is a frustrated, but intelligent otter who is also Sniz's roommate and best friend. He is always seen wearing a blue chef hat. His real name is Squeaky. Fondue was voiced by Oscar Riba. Originally, Brandon wanted to voice Fondue himself like he did in the pilot "Psyched for Snuppa" but the Nickelodeon producers believed that he should not be too close to his creation. He is named after the food fondue.
- Snuppa Doojers — One of Sniz and Fondue's roommates. Like Fondue, he is bald too. Snuppa and his girlfriend Bianca, who share a house with roommates Sniz and Fondue, were later phased out in the third season of KaBLam! (and the second half of the second season of the show(Sniz & Fondue)) as the writers believed that Sniz and Fondue seem to write themselves. Snuppa was voiced by Meat Loaf in the pilot episode and by John Andrew Walsh in the shorts.
- Bianca Lo Bianca — One of Sniz and Fondue's roommates. She has a clownish blond hairstyle and is Snuppa's girlfriend. Bianca and Snuppa, who share a house with roommates Sniz and Fondue, were later phased out in the third season of KaBLam! (and the second half of the second season of the show(Sniz & Fondue)) as the writers believed that Sniz and Fondue seem to write themselves. Bianca was voiced by Monica Lee Gradischek (credited as Lee Bashforth).

== Episodes ==
=== Pilot (1992) ===
No.	Title	Directed by	Original release date
0	"Psyched for Snuppa"	John R. Dilworth	1992
Bianca is taken hostage while babysitting and Snuppa, Sniz and Fondue come to her rescue.

=== Season 1 (1996) ===
Every season 1 episode was written by Mike R. Brandon and directed by Frank Gresham.

No.	Title	Original release date
1	"Second-hand Sniz"	October 7, 1996
Sniz refuses to learn how to tell time, so his roommates teach him the hard way.
2	"The Making of a Supermodel"	October 14, 1996
Fondue buys a model that he wants to keep in the box to retain the collector's value, but Sniz desperately wants to build it
3	"Mod Stylin'"	October 21, 1996
After using too much hair gel, Sniz goes bald.
4	"Rage Against the Vending Machine"	October 28, 1996
Sniz and Fondue become frustrated with a vending machine.
5	"Stunt Bike Sniz"	November 4, 1996
Sniz gets a new motorcycle, and attempts all kinds of crazy stunts to impress his roommates, and ends up in the news.
6	"Squeaky Clean"	November 11, 1996
Fondue becomes a germophobe, and isolates himself from the rest of the world in a bubble in the backyard.
7	"You Dummy"	November 18, 1996
Sniz throws his voice to help Fondue become a ventriloquist, but receives no thanks.
8	"Dark Vator"	November 25, 1996
While attending a convention of their favorite sci-fi show, Shapiro: Warp Speed 10 (parody of Star Trek), Sniz ends up trapping himself and Fondue in an elevator at the convention center.
9	"Fashionably Fondue"	January 3, 1997
Fondue attempts to become a fashion designer.
10	"War of the Supergeeks"	January 19, 1997
Sniz and Fondue fight over the prize in the cereal box, so Snuppa and Bianca make them try to outdo each other in household chores to see who gets the prize.
11	"Mr. Sniz's Wide Ride"	February 15, 1997
Aliens land in the backyard and invite Sniz aboard their spaceship, something that he soon regrets.
12	"A Toxic Tail"	February 20, 1997
Fondue purchases a deadly scorpion to keep Sniz out of his room, but it soon gets loose, and he, Sniz, Snuppa and Bianca hunt for it.
13	"The Borrowers"	March 17, 1997
Sniz and Fondue borrow a quarter from someone who turns out to be a loan shark.

=== Season 2 (1997) ===
No.	Title	Original release date
14	"Hello Dolly"	March 31, 1997
Sniz gives Fondue a doll that had been cursed by a gypsy that Sniz angered.
15	"Chicanery Chums"	April 1, 1997
Sniz goes on a practical joking spree, which annoys Fondue to the point that he pulls a prank of his own by pretending he got killed in one of Sniz's pranks. Note: Creator Mike Brandon did not write this episode.
16	"Rat in the Hat"	April 5, 1997
Fondue reluctantly lets Sniz borrow his beloved hat, which he soon wants back.
17	"Celluloid Sins"	April 18, 1997
Sniz takes a new hobby called Plexing, in which he sneaks into various movie theaters without paying for a ticket.
18	"Great Infestations"	May 5, 1997
Sniz accidentally lets termites infest the house, so he, Fondue, Snuppa and Bianca check into a hotel, but being fed up with their respective roommates, Fondue rooms with Bianca, letting Snuppa put up with Sniz. Note: Final appearance of Snuppa and Bianca.
19	"Clubbed"	May 27, 1997
Sniz signs him and Fondue up for a CD of the Month club, but soon the price becomes unreasonable, and they are unable to pay, nor return the CDs, that had been damaged.
20	"Solitaire Confinement"	June 30, 1997
Fondue becomes addicted to Computer Solitare, so much that he ignores Sniz... and the burglars robbing their house. Note: Creator Mike Brandon was not involved with this episode.
21	"The Great Chili Cookoff"	July 13, 1997
Sniz and Fondue enter a chili cookoff to win a freeride in a fire engine.
22	"Penny-ante Vigilantes"	August 5, 1997
Sniz suddenly becomes a kleptomaniac in his sleep. Note: Creator Mike Brandon was not involved with this episode.
23	"Hosed!"	October 4, 1997
Sniz believes that he can magically cure people who have been injured with his garden hose, but actually makes things worse. Note: Creator Mike Brandon was not involved with this episode.

== See also ==
- List of programs broadcast by Nickelodeon
