= Funbag Animation Studios =

Canadian animation studio

- Industry: Animation
- Founded: 1992; 34 years ago
- Founder: Eddie Egan; Joseph Sullivan; Gord Coulthart; Curtis Crawford; Rick Morrison; Don Spencer
- Defunct: April 29, 2007; 19 years ago
- Fate: Dormancy
- Headquarters: Ottawa, Ontario, Canada
- Products: Just Jamie (2003–2004); The Eggs (2004–2005); Faireez (2005); LazyTown (animation for the episode "Once Upon a Time" only) (2006)
- Website: funbag.com (archived 06-14-2006)

Funbag Animation Studios (also known as Funbag Animation Studio Inc. or Funbag) was a Canadian animation studio headquartered in Ottawa, Ontario. Funbag was well-known for working on animated television series such as Undergrads, Freaky Stories, Toad Patrol, Watership Down, Anthony Ant, King, Mole Sisters, Just Jamie, The Eggs, For Better or For Worse, Faireez, Madeline, Berenstain Bears & Seven Little Monsters.

Funbag also provided additional production services on projects such as The Simpsons, Toad Patrol, The Ren & Stimpy Show, Beavis and Butt-Head, Rupert, the LazyTown episode "Once Upon a Time", LeapFrog, The Oz Kids, The Land Before Time V: The Mysterious Island, Sniz & Fondue, Freaky Stories, Captain Star, Birdz, Ace Ventura: Pet Detective, (Note: As stated in the ending credits.) Wild C.A.T.s, The Lionhearts, The Ripping Friends, Ed, Edd n Eddy, Urmel, Aaahh!!! Real Monsters, RoboRoach, The New Woody Woodpecker Show, The Oblongs, Mission Hill, Rainbow Fish, and Back to School with Franklin, Little Bear & The Magic School Bus.

On April 29, 2007, the company closed due to being dormant with operations being ceased, and some of the employees at the studio founded New Bike Entertainment to secure Funbag's assets. It also had an office in India.
