= Unfabulous =

Television series

- Genre: Teen sitcom
- Created by: Sue Rose
- Showrunner: Sue Rose
- Starring: Emma Roberts; Malese Jow; Jordan Calloway; Tadhg Kelly; Molly Hagan; Markus Flanagan; Emma Degerstedt; Chelsea Tavares
- Narrated by: Emma Roberts
- Theme music composer: Jill Sobule
- Opening theme: "Unfabulous" performed by Jill Sobule
- Country of origin: United States
- Original language: English
- No. of seasons: 3
- No. of episodes: 41 (list of episodes)

Production
- Executive producer: Sue Rose
- Camera setup: Film, Single-camera
- Running time: 23 minutes
- Production company: Nickelodeon Productions

Original release
- Network: Nickelodeon
- Release: September 12, 2004 – December 16, 2007

Unfabulous is an American teen sitcom that aired on Nickelodeon. The series is about an "unfabulous" middle schooler named Addie Singer, played by Emma Roberts. The show, which premiered on September 12, 2004, was one of the most-watched programs in the U.S. among children and teenagers between the ages of 10 and 16. It was created by Sue Rose, who previously created two animated series Pepper Ann (for Disney) and Angela Anaconda, and co-created the character Fido Dido with Joanna Ferrone. The series concluded on December 16, 2007, with the final episode titled "The Best Trip Ever".

Most of the episodes are narrated by Addie, and are told in flashbacks. The show's theme song is performed by Jill Sobule, who also wrote the songs performed throughout the show.

== Premise ==
Unfabulous' main lead character is a teenage girl named Addie Singer (Emma Roberts), who writes songs about her life in middle school. Her best friends are Geena Fabiano (Malese Jow), who is interested in fashion and designs her own clothes, and the environmentally committed school basketball player Zack Carter-Schwartz (Jordan Calloway). They all attend Rocky Road Middle School in an unmentioned East Coast city. However, in episode 34 "The Birthday" when Addie receives a letter from when she was 7 years old the address is listed as "Pinecrest, PA". Addie's older brother Ben (Tadhg Kelly) works at Juice!, a smoothie bar where Addie and her friends often hang out after school.

Throughout the first season, Addie obsesses about her crush on Jake Behari (Note: The character's last name is spelled both Behari and Bahari by Nickelodeon.) (Raja Fenske), who recently had his girlfriend (Bianca Collins).

For the majority of the second season, however, Addie is dating Randy Klein (Evan Palmer). They break up towards the end of the show's season and Addie realizes that she still likes Jake. The made-for-TV movie Unfabulous: The Perfect Moment focused on Addie and Jake getting together although Jake will be gone for the rest of the summer in Canada.

In the third season, Addie and Jake finally begin dating and Geena and Zack begin to have feelings for each other.

== Episodes ==
Season	Episodes	Originally released	
Season	Episodes	First released	Last released
1	13	September 12, 2004	March 6, 2005
2	15	September 10, 2005	October 7, 2006
3	13	August 10, 2007	December 16, 2007

== Cast and characters ==
The cast (from left to right) Kelly, Flanagan, Jow, Roberts, Hagan, and Calloway

=== Main ===
- Emma Roberts as Addie Singer, the 13-year-old main lead.
- Malese Jow as Geena Fabiano, Addie's best friend who is interested in fashion and designs her own clothes, which are usually provocative and therefore she receives daily lectures from the school principal.
- Jordan Calloway as Zack Carter-Schwartz, Addie's male Black American best friend who is on the basketball team and an environmental advocate that wears sandals
- Tadhg Kelly as Ben Singer, Addie's older brother
- Molly Hagan as Mrs. Sue Singer, Addie's mother
- Markus Flanagan as Mr. Jeff Singer, Addie's father
- Emma Degerstedt as Maris Bingham, (Note: Added to the main cast at the beginning of the second season.) a mean girl.
- Chelsea Tavares as Cranberry St. Claire, Maris' Black American minion.

=== Recurring ===
- Dustin Ingram as Duane Oglivy
- Mary Lou as Mary Ferry
- Raja Fenske as Jake Behari, Addie's Asian boyfriend.
- Bianca Collins as Patti Perez. Another Latina mean girl who joins Maris & Cranberry and ex-girlfriend of Jake who tries to make Addie jealous and humiliate her.
- Sarah Hester as Jen Stevenson-Ben's girlfriend and co-worker at Juice!
- Harry Perry III as Manager Mike
- Stephen Ford as Chad
- Mildred Dumas as Principal Brandywine
- Evan Palmer as Randy Klein
- Sean Whalen as Coach Pearson
- Brandon Smith as Mario (season 1)
- Miracle Vincent as Ellie
- Shawn McGill as Freddy
- Carter Jenkins as Eli Pataki (season 1)
- Shanica Knowles as Vanessa
- Lourdes Pantin as Becca

=== Other appearances ===
The series' main lead character, Addie Singer, also appears in a crossover episode of Drake & Josh called "Honor Council", in which she helps Megan (Cosgrove) play a prank on Josh for a video that Megan makes for her website. The episode aired in November 2004, a few months after both series had premiered in the same year.

== Broadcast and home media ==
The series aired on Nickelodeon and premiered in the United States on September 12, 2004. The final episode aired on December 16, 2007. Reruns of the series aired on TeenNick (formerly The N) from late 2006 until 2015.

Unfabulous has also previously aired on Nickelodeon Canada and Nickelodeon Teen in France.

=== DVD and streaming ===
The DVD "TEENick Picks, Volume 1," released on April 18, 2006 by Paramount Home Entertainment, features "The Little Sister" (Season 1, Episode 11).

Title	Release date	Episodes
The Complete 1st Season	September 23, 2008 (USA)	1-13
Three-disc release, all 13 episodes, exclusively released on Amazon.com, as a "CreateSpace" program of "Burn-On-Demand" DVDs.
Title	Release date	Episodes
The Complete 2nd Season	September 23, 2008 (USA)	14-28
Three-disc release, all 15 episodes, exclusively released on Amazon.com, as a "CreateSpace" program of "Burn-On-Demand" DVDs.
The Complete 3rd Season	Late 2008 (USA)	29-41

All episodes from the first and second seasons (including The Perfect Moment) were available for download in the iTunes Store in the United States since Autumn 2006, but are currently not available anymore. They have since been put back for download as of 2012.

== Awards and nominations ==
Year	Award	Category	Recipient	Result	Ref.
2005	Young Artist Awards	Best Performance in a TV Series (Comedy or Drama) – Leading Young Actress	Emma Roberts	Nominated	
2005	Young Artist Awards	Best Performance in a Television Series (Comedy or Drama) – Recurring Young Actor	Carter Jenkins	Nominated	
2005	Young Artist Awards	Outstanding Young Performers in a TV Series	Jordan Calloway; Bianca Collins; Dustin Ingram; Mary Lou; Carter Jenkins; Malese Jow; Emma Roberts; Brandon Smith; Chelsea Tavares	Nominated	
2005	Teen Choice Awards	Choice TV Breakout Show	Unfabulous	Nominated	
2005	Teen Choice Awards	Choice TV Breakout Performance – Female	Emma Roberts	Nominated	
2005	2005 Australian Kids' Choice Awards	Fave TV Show	Unfabulous	Nominated	
2005	2005 Australian Kids' Choice Awards	Fave Rising Star	Emma Roberts	Nominated	
2005	Casting Society of America	Best Casting – Children's Programming	Harriet Greenspan	Nominated	
2006	Young Artist Awards	Best Young Ensemble Performance in a TV Series (Comedy or Drama)	Jordan Calloway; Bianca Collins; Emma Degerstedt; Dustin Ingram; Mary Lou; Malese Jow; Carter Jenkins; Emma Roberts; Brandon Smith; Chelsea Tavares	Nominated	
2006	Casting Society of America	Best Casting – Children's TV Programming	Harriet Greenspan	Nominated	
2007	Young Artist Awards	Best Performance in a TV Series (Comedy or Drama) – Leading Young Actress	Emma Roberts	Nominated	
2007	Young Artist Awards	Best Young Ensemble Performance in a TV Series (Comedy or Drama)	Jordan Calloway; Malese Jow; Emma Roberts; Chelsea Tavares; Emma Degerstedt; Dustin Ingram; Mary Lou	Nominated	
2007	Young Artist Awards	Best Family Television Series (Comedy)	Unfabulous	Nominated	
2007	Teen Choice Awards	Choice TV Actress: Comedy	Emma Roberts	Nominated	
2007	2007 Kids' Choice Awards	Favorite TV Actress	Emma Roberts	Nominated	
2007	2007 Australian Kids' Choice Awards	Fave Nick Show	Unfabulous	Nominated	
2007	2007 UK Kids' Choice Awards	Best TV Actress	Emma Roberts	Nominated	
2007	Casting Society of America	Best Casting – Children's TV Programming	Harriet Greenspan	Nominated	
2008	Young Artist Awards	Best Performance in a TV Series – Leading Young Actress	Emma Roberts	Nominated	
2008	Young Artist Awards	Best Performance in a TV Series – Supporting Young Actress	Malese Jow	Nominated	
2008	Young Artist Awards	Best Young Ensemble Performance in a TV Series	Jordan Calloway; Bianca Collins; Dustin Ingram; Malese Jow; Mary Lou; Emma Roberts; Chelsea Tavares	Nominated	
2008	2008 Kids' Choice Awards	Favorite TV Actress	Emma Roberts	Nominated	

== Merchandise ==
Along with the start of the second season in September 2005, Nickelodeon also began selling different types of Unfabulous-related merchandise, beginning with the album Unfabulous and More (see Soundtrack below). In November 2005, the album was followed by two books tying into the show, Keepin' It Real (ISBN 0-439-79666-0) and Split Ends (ISBN 0-439-80179-6), both written by Robin Wasserman, and the first items in a line of clothes based on Addie's wardrobe on the show. Four more books were released in February 2006, Starstruck (ISBN 0-439-83157-1), Jinxed! (ISBN 0-439-83158-X), Meltdown and Just Deal. The last book released in 2007 was based on the two-part episode, The Perfect Moment, by Samantha Margles. The books are narrated by Addie herself in her own words depicting each storyline.

Before the launch of the third season, a video game based on the show was released for the Game Boy Advance by THQ on September 25, 2006.

=== Soundtrack ===
On September 27, 2005, shortly after the premiere of the show's second season, Columbia Records and Nick Records released the album Unfabulous and More, which serves as both the show's soundtrack and as Emma Roberts' debut album.

The album includes several original songs (among them "Dummy" and "I Wanna Be", both of which were also released as music videos, "I Have Arrived", and "This Is Me", which was co-written by Roberts), as well as some of Addie's songs from the first season (however in newly recorded versions), including "Punch Rocker" and "New Shoes" (both from the episode "The Party"), "94 Weeks (Metal Mouth Freak)" (from "The Bar Mitzvah") and "Mexican Wrestler" (which had previously appeared on Jill Sobule's 2000 album Pink Pearl and in the Unfabulous episode "The 66th Day").

The album peaked at #46 on Billboard's Heatseekers Albums.
