= YM (magazine) =

American teen magazine (1932–2004)

- Cover of July 1997 issue with Alicia Silverstone
- Categories: Teen magazine
- Frequency: Bi-monthly
- Publisher: Gruner + Jahr; Conde Nast Publications
- Founded: 1932
- Final issue: 2004
- Country: USA

YM was an American teen magazine that began in 1932. The magazine ceased publication in 2004.

== History ==
The magazine was published for 72 years. It was the oldest girls' magazine in the United States. YM got its start as two magazines in the 1930s—Compact, which was aimed at older teens, and Calling All Girls, which was intended for younger girls and pioneered the signature embarrassing-moments column, "Say Anything". By the late 1960s, the publications merged into Young Miss, a small digest-sized mag. The 1980s saw a change in size to a regular magazine on glossy print (similar to Teen) designed by Randy Dunbar and Mark Borden. Several years later, still another title change (this time to Young & Modern) under Bonnie Fuller's direction as editor-in-chief. The final title change came in 2000 (this time to Your Magazine), though the abbreviation "YM" was the title by which it was commonly referred. In early 2002, then editor-in-chief Christina Kelly announced that the magazine would no longer run articles about dieting. YM ceased publication in 2004, with the December–January issue. Subscribers received Teen Vogue subscriptions in replacement.

The television series Pepper Ann was based on a comic strip by Sue Rose that debuted in YM. The strip was spun off from a YM Fido Dido strip also by Rose, the character's co-creator.

YM is no longer published online and now the domain is only a link to Teen Vogue. However, the forums on the YM website remained very active following the end of the magazine. After the website finally closed, the forum members moved their boards onto another domain.

The publisher was Gruner + Jahr before the assets of YM were purchased by Conde Nast Publications in October 2004. This purchase included YM's subscription file, title and brand name, rights to special publication titles, domain name, and newsstand pockets.
