= Mary Lou (actress) =

American actress

- Occupation: Actress
- Years active: 2003–present

Mary Lou is an American actress. She is best known for playing Mary Ferry on the Nickelodeon television series Unfabulous, also starring Emma Roberts.

== Career ==
Mary Lou's show business career started at age six when she entertained as a member of Singing Solo (a children's singing group located in La Mesa, CA) at a local street fair with a rendition of The Good Ship Lollipop. After this performance, she chose acting as her career. Over the next few years, Lou went on to sing at over two dozen venues throughout Southern California, Texas and Tennessee, winning multiple local, state, regional, national and world championship titles.

Mary Lou has guest starred on Phil of the Future, as a math-nerd named Alex, as well as Glee, 3 lbs and What Should You Do?. She also appeared in made for TV movies including Future Girls: Adventures in Marine Biology and Bad Mother's Handbook. She continues to audition daily for feature films, television and voiceover.

In 2004, Mary Lou landed her most prominent role till that point, on Unfabulous as a nerd named Mary Ferry. Sue Rose, executive producer of the show claims that Mary Ferry was only originally intended for one episode but was 'so funny and likable' she appears in thirty altogether. In 2008, the cast of Unfabulous were nominated for a Young Artist Award for Best Young Ensemble Performance in a TV Series.

She is a featured player on The Glass Cannon Network, a podcast network of tabletop role-playing games, where she plays Ragga Beardaughter on their show Blood of the Wild.

== Filmography ==
Year	Title	Character	Notes
2010	Jesus Awakens The Little Girl	Gertrude	(short)
2009	Glee	1970's Glee Club Singer/Dancer	"Pilot"
2008	The Bad Mother's Handbook	Teenage Nam	TV movie
2008	Being Bailey	Rachel	Unaired TV Pilot
2006	3 lbs	Charlotte Hansen/Charlotte McDermott	"Unaired Pilot" "Lost For Words"
2006	Future Girls: Adventures in Marine Biology	Lisa	TV movie
2005	Phil of the Future	Alex	"Good Phil Hunting"
2004-2007	Unfabulous	Mary Ferry	30 episodes
2003	What Should You Do?	Katie Oren	"Hooked On A Post"
