= List of Unfabulous episodes =

The following is an episode list for the Nickelodeon sitcom Unfabulous. The series aired from September 12, 2004 to December 16, 2007 with a total of 41 episodes and three seasons produced.

== Series overview ==
Season	Episodes	Originally released	
Season	Episodes	First released	Last released
1	13	September 12, 2004	March 6, 2005
2	15	September 10, 2005	October 7, 2006
3	13	August 10, 2007	December 16, 2007

== Episodes ==
=== Season 1 (2004–05) ===
No. overall	No. in season	Title	Directed by	Written by	Original release date	Prod. code
1	1	"The Party"	Linda Mendoza	Sue Rose	September 12, 2004	101
To become popular, Addie decides to host a party at the beginning of seventh grade that Randy usually hosts, as he is incapacitated due to a skiing accident.
2	2	"The Secret"	Fred Savage	Laura McCreary	September 19, 2004	102
After learning that Geena and Zach haven't always been telling her the truth, Addie comes up with a rule forbidding the three friends to lie to each other. However, they continue to keep secrets without Addie's knowledge.
3	3	"The Picture"	Bethany Rooney	Sue Rose	September 26, 2004	103
During school picture day, Addie becomes self-conscious when Maris and Cranberry tell her her hair is flat, and her attempts to change her hairstyle go awry. After Addie's mom tells her that everybody has something they feel insecure about, she returns to school to have her picture taken.
4	4	"The Book Club"	Linda Mendoza	Madellaine Paxson	October 10, 2004	104
Addie's mother takes her to a mother daughter book club, during which Addie tries to escape to hang out with her friends by sneaking out the doggie door. As she is squeezing through, her skirt gets snagged and torn, leaving Addie in her underwear. She ultimately decides to return home.
5	5	"The Pal"	Bethany Rooney	Laura McCreary	October 17, 2004	105
Unsure if her crush Jake Behari reciprocates her interest, Addie follows a teen magazine's advice to capture his attention.
6	6	"The Rep"	Joe Menendez	Chris Nee	November 7, 2004	106
Addie becomes "popular" during a school assignment where the students are put into cliques and not allowed to talk to members of other groups. She ends up being paired with Maris, while Geena is an "AV Geek" with Cranberry.
7	7	"The Pink Guitar"	Linda Mendoza	Nahnatchka Khan	November 28, 2004	107
Addie joins a girl group called The Cute Girls, who are looking for a guitarist. Addie is initially ecstatic at the prospect of sharing her talent with the world, but the other band members explain that they just expect her to be a good dancer and look cute, as their guitars are just for decoration and they lip sync to all of their songs. Addie ultimately quits after one performance. Note: The guitars that Addie and The Cute Girls use in this episode are designed by Daisy Rock Guitars.
8	8	"The 66th Day"	Fred Savage	Matt Negrete	January 2, 2005	108
When Zach accidentally borrows Addie's CD containing 65 songs about Jake, she attempts to retrieve it before anyone can hear it.
9	9	"The List of Kissed"	Bethany Rooney	Laura McCreary	January 9, 2005	109
Desperate to get her name added to a list of girls that have been kissed by a boy, Addie tries to get Eli (Carter Jenkins) to kiss her.
10	10	"The B Word"	Joe Menendez	Eddie Guzelian	January 16, 2005	110
Addie is distrusting of Geena's new boyfriend, who has a reputation for dating several girls at once. Meanwhile, Zach's basketball team must play basketball in wheelchairs when playing against a disabled team.
11	11	"The Little Sister"	Fred Savage	Madellaine Paxson	January 30, 2005	111
In an attempt to escape from her older brother's shadow, Addie sets out to get an article published in the school newspaper, which is something he never accomplished. However, she succeeds in a different way than she expected.
12	12	"The Partner"	Joe Menendez	Laura McCreary	February 13, 2005	112
Addie tries to convince Zach to be her science fair partner, as nobody else will due to her poor track record with science projects.
13	13	"The Bar Mitzvah"	Linda Mendoza	Nahnatchka Khan & Laura McCreary	March 6, 2005	113
Addie is invited to Randy's Bar Mitzvah, but is reluctant to attend after being teased about her new braces.

=== Season 2 (2005–06) ===
No. overall	No. in season	Title	Directed by	Written by	Original release date	Prod. code
14	1	"The Rhinoceros In the Middle of the Room"	Joe Menendez	Sue Rose	September 10, 2005	201
Addie has a crush on Randy, but has been avoiding him because she is unsure if he reciprocates her interest. Addie's aunt Bertha informs her that kissing with braces can be lethal, heightening Addie's anxiety. Bertha later passes away; the tragedy inspires Addie to face her fears, and she begins officially dating Jake.
15	2	"The Balancing Act"	Victor Nelli, Jr.	Laura McCreary	September 18, 2005	202
Addie spends so much time with Randy that she begins to forget about her friends, and must learn how to balance her relationship and friendships. Meanwhile, Zach feels angered when he gets a new nickname.
16	3	"The Job"	Savage Steve Holland	Madellaine Paxson	September 25, 2005	203
Due to her past irresponsibility with money, Addie pledges to get a job so she can finally pay her friends back what she owes them.
17	4	"The Eye Randy"	Allison Liddi Brown	Nahnatchka Khan	October 9, 2005	204
Addie's jealousy begins interfering with her relationship with Randy when she starts confronting any other girl who admires him.
18	5	"The Road Trip"	Fred Savage	Matt Negrete	October 16, 2005	205
Addie pretends to have a cold to get out of accompanying her parents to the Tri-State Sporting Goods Trade Show.
19	6	"The Charity Case"	Victor Nelli, Jr.	Chris Nee	October 23, 2005	206
Addie and Geena set out to raise money and beat Cranberry and Maris during Charity Week by loaning a cow. Elsewhere, Ben starts to pull pranks on people just like his father.
20	7	"The Dark Side"	Fred Savage	Madellaine Paxson	October 29, 2005	208
While playing spin the bottle at a Halloween party, Addie kisses someone dressed as Darth Vader. However, noticing that there are multiple attendees in Darth Vader costume, Addie begins questioning who she actually kissed.
21	8	"The Information"	Bethany Rooney	Laura McCreary	November 6, 2005	207
Addie is displeased when she finds out the boys have been going to mini golf without inviting any girls.
22	9	"The Grey Area"	Carlos Gonzalez	Catherine Lieuwen	January 15, 2006	209
Geena and Maris both design new cheerleader uniforms, and Addie has to make the selection between the two. However, Addie is worried she will be accused of choosing Geena just because Geena is her best friend.
23	10	"The Perfect Couple"	Rachel Talalay	Madellaine Paxson	January 22, 2006	210
Addie starts doubting her relationship with Randy, as he doesn't know much about her and vice versa. Meanwhile, Zach is crushing on an 8th grader who refuses to go out with him because he is a 7th grader.
24	11	"The Setup"	Savage Steve Holland	Erik Durbin	January 29, 2006	212
Despite having positive intentions, Geena and Zach fail miserably at helping Addie get over her breakup with Randy.
25	12	"The Drama"	Joe Menendez	Laura McCreary	February 26, 2006	211
Addie is chosen to direct the school play, which features Geena and Jake as the leads. A jealous Addie tries to use her powers as director to sabotage the play, but this backfires.
26	13	"The Last Day of 7th Grade" "The All About Yearbooks"	Sue Rose	Nahnatchka Khan & Jessica Rabbiner	April 16, 2006	213
After Addie and Jake exchange yearbooks, she learns that he was the Darth Vader who kissed her, and that he has a crush on her, but mistakenly believes she only likes him as a friend.
27	14	"The Perfect Moment"	Joe Menendez	Laura McCreary and Madellaine Paxson	October 7, 2006	214
28	15	"The Perfect Moment"	Joe Menendez	Laura McCreary and Madellaine Paxson	October 7, 2006	215
Addie finally gets the chance to confess her feelings to Jake, but learns he has gotten back together with his ex-girlfriend Patty. Meanwhile, Geena wants to move to Paris after meeting a handsome waiter there who likes her, and Zach goes to a restaurant to free a lobster.

=== Season 3 (2007) ===
After being on hiatus for 10 months (due to Roberts promoting Aquamarine and filming Nancy Drew), one episode from the third and final season aired in the US on August 10, 2007. Miranda Cosgrove guest starred in the episode, titled "The Talent Show", as part of "Miranda Madness weekend". The third season first aired on Latin America on May 21, 2007, with an entire week of new episodes, it followed in the United Kingdom in July 2007 on Nickelodeon.

No. overall	No. in season	Title	Directed by	Written by	Original release date	Prod. code
29	1	"The Talent Show"	Allison Liddi-Brown	Madellaine Paxson	August 10, 2007	311
Addie is determined to win first place in the school talent show by getting her dog to say "I love you". Jake initially agrees to help her, but abandons the plan to participate in another magic act with his friend Cosmina (Miranda Cosgrove). Addie, Geena and Zack try to get rid of Cosmina when they discover she is a very cruel and ill-natured person. Meanwhile, Addie's dad wants to advertise on television to compete with a superstar.
30	2	"The Auction"	Carlos Gonzalez	Matt Negrete	September 16, 2007	304
Right before the school dance, Addie bursts a water pipe in the gym where the dance was supposed to be held. Addie suggests a "boy auction" to raise money to fix the pipe, but when Mary wins Jake, Addie and Geena must attempt to intercept their date. Note: This episode aired as part of Nickelodeon's dancing lineup, featuring dancing themed episodes of Nickelodeon's sitcoms and also featured new episodes of Just Jordan, Zoey 101, iCarly and Drake & Josh.
31	3	"The Toot"	Savage Steve Holland	Matt Negrette	September 23, 2007	301
Addie's first day of eighth grade goes exceedingly well, but her newfound popularity is threatened when she embarrasses herself by farting in English class while delivering an oral book report.
32	4	"The Song"	Nisha Ganatra	Madellaine Perez Paxson	September 30, 2007	302
Addie finds out about a song contest, the winner of which gets to record their song with famous pop star Rob Hottie. Jake purposely sabotages Addie's submission, fearful that Addie will fall in love with Rob and forget about him. Addie's song ends up winning; however, the song is merely included in a burger advert, to her dismay.
33	5	"The New Best Friend"	Savage Steve Holland	Laura McCreary	October 10, 2007	303
Jelene gets kicked out of Saint Agnes School, and enrolls in Addie's school. Addie becomes suspicious when Jelene is overly polite, and Addie sneaks into St. Agnes to determine the grounds for Jelene's expulsion, which was burglary of the school mascot. Meanwhile, Geena deals with a bird that keeps attacking her for an unknown reason.
34	6	"The Two Timer"	Savage Steve Holland	Erik Durbin	October 28, 2007	305
Several people claim to have seen Addie at times where she claimed to have a prior commitment. Addie is initially confused, but eventually learns that she has a doppelgänger. Meanwhile, Zack tries everything he can to make Jake cry.
35	7	"The L Bomb"	Joe Menendez	Nahnatchka Khan	November 4, 2007	306
During Addie and Jake's six month anniversary, Addie tries to avoid him after thinking she overheard him say he loves her.
36	8	"The Birthday"	Savage Steve Holland	Eddie Guzelian	November 11, 2007	307
As Addie's fourteenth birthday approaches, Ben hands her a list she created when she was seven, comprising all of the things she wanted to do before she turned 14 and including a clause that she will spend the day as Ben's maid if she does not complete each task on the list. Addie attempts to complete the list in three days in order to avoid this fate. Guest star: Bailee Madison as Young Addie
37	9	"The Guilt Trip"	Markus Flanagan	Chris Nee	November 18, 2007	308
While on the balance beam, Maris falls and becomes wheelchair bound. A guilt-stricken Addie, who was meant to catch her, tries to make it up to her by assisting her in a beauty pageant, only to discover Maris has been faking her injury. Meanwhile, Ben gets stuck with an annoying kid from a little brother program, and Jake becomes convinced that Zach and Geena would make a good couple despite the two's reluctance to date each other.
38	10	"The Quest"	Robert Townsend	Madellaine Perez Paxson	December 2, 2007	309
Addie's class gets careers, and Addie gets lip-gloss filler. But when she gets fired, she struggles to find her future.
39	11	"The Test"	Joe Menendez	Jessica Rabbiner	December 9, 2007	310
Ben reveals he doesn't want to attend college, which interferes with Addie's plan to be on the new Rocky Road News. Addie learns that Ben failed his college exam and helps him properly prepare for it. Guest star: Bailee Madison as Young Addie
40	12	"The Best Trip Ever"	Savage Steve Holland	Matt Negrete and Sue Rose	December 16, 2007	312
41	13	"The Best Trip Ever"	Savage Steve Holland	Matt Negrete and Sue Rose	December 16, 2007	313
When Addie wins a contest to plan the eight grade class trip, she chooses a cruise. Zach plans to tell Geena about his feelings for her during the Cruz. Maris, Cranberry, and Patty give Addie a video tape of Zach admitting his feelings for Geena; Addie subsequently plots to keep Zach and Geena apart to save their friendship, which Jake tries to foil. Zach and Geena eventually cement their relationship and forgive Addie for her attempts to meddle, and Maris and Cranberry befriend the group. Note: This is a two-part episode that was promoted as a made-for-TV movie by Nickelodeon.
