= Bianca Collins =

American actress

- Occupation: Actress
- Years active: 1996–present

Bianca Collins is an American actress, curator, and writer. She is known for her role as Patti Perez in the Nickelodeon series Unfabulous, and as Lulu in the Teen Nick program Gigantic.

== Career ==
Collins's acting career began in 1996, with her first role in the pre-Broadway workshop of Paul Simon's play The Capeman, starring Marc Anthony. Her role was written out of the play before its short 1998 Broadway run. Collins was a member of the 1997 20th anniversary Broadway cast of Annie, both as July and Duffy. She continued as a member of the 1998–1999 national touring company for the musical. Her on-stage acting continued in Los Angeles in 2001 as a cast member of Selena: A Musical Celebration Of Life.

She was contracted to be part of the cast for the 2001 film Glitter, but before production started she was replaced by Brazilian actress Isabel Gomes in the role of young Mariah Carey.

Her television movie credits include the Disney Channel Original Movie Tiger Cruise, the George Lopez holiday movie Naughty or Nice, and the MTV musical The American Mall.

Collins's additional television credits include guest starring in episodes of Law & Order, Strong Medicine, House and The Secret Life of the American Teenager.

From 2004 to 2007, Collins played Patti Perez on Unfabulous, starring alongside Emma Roberts. From 2010 to 2011, she played Lulu on Gigantic until its cancellation. These are her biggest roles, and take advantage of her teen/tween friendly image.

Collins is lead vocalist for the songs 'At the Mall' and 'A Little Bit of Heart Somewhere' on the American Mall soundtrack.

In addition to her career in acting, Collins has been involved in contemporary art. She served as editor of the popular Los Angeles-based radio segment, "Art Talk," writes for Artillery magazine, and as of 2022 is the director of public programs for Zócalo Public Square.

== Young Artist Award nominations ==
Collins has been nominated for accolades on several occasions. In 2005, she was nominated for a Young Artist Award for 'Outstanding Young Performers in a TV Series' for Unfabulous, along with the rest of the cast. Also this year she was nominated for 'Best Performance in a TV Movie, Miniseries or Special – Supporting Young Actress' for her role as Tina Torres in Tiger Cruise. Collins received two further nominations alongside the cast of Unfabulous, in 2006 for 'Best Young Ensemble Performance in a TV Series (Comedy or Drama)' and in 2008 for 'Best Young Ensemble Performance in a TV Series'.

== Filmography ==
Year	Title	Role	Notes
1997	Law & Order	Darlene Muller	Episode: "Legacy"
2004	Strong Medicine	Hailey	Episode: "Quarantine"
2004	Tiger Cruise	Tina Torres	Television film
2004	Naughty or Nice	Olivia Romiro	Television film
2004	Unfabulous	Patti Perez	20 episodes
2008	The American Mall	Mia	Television film
2009	House M.D.	Phoebe	Episode: "Known Unknowns"
2010	Gigantic	Lulu Khandon	12 episodes
2013	The Secret Life of the American Teenager	Mica	Episode: "'Fraid So"
2014	Dragon Nest: Warriors' Dawn	Argenta, the Silver Dragon (voice)	Film
