= Raja Fenske =

American actor

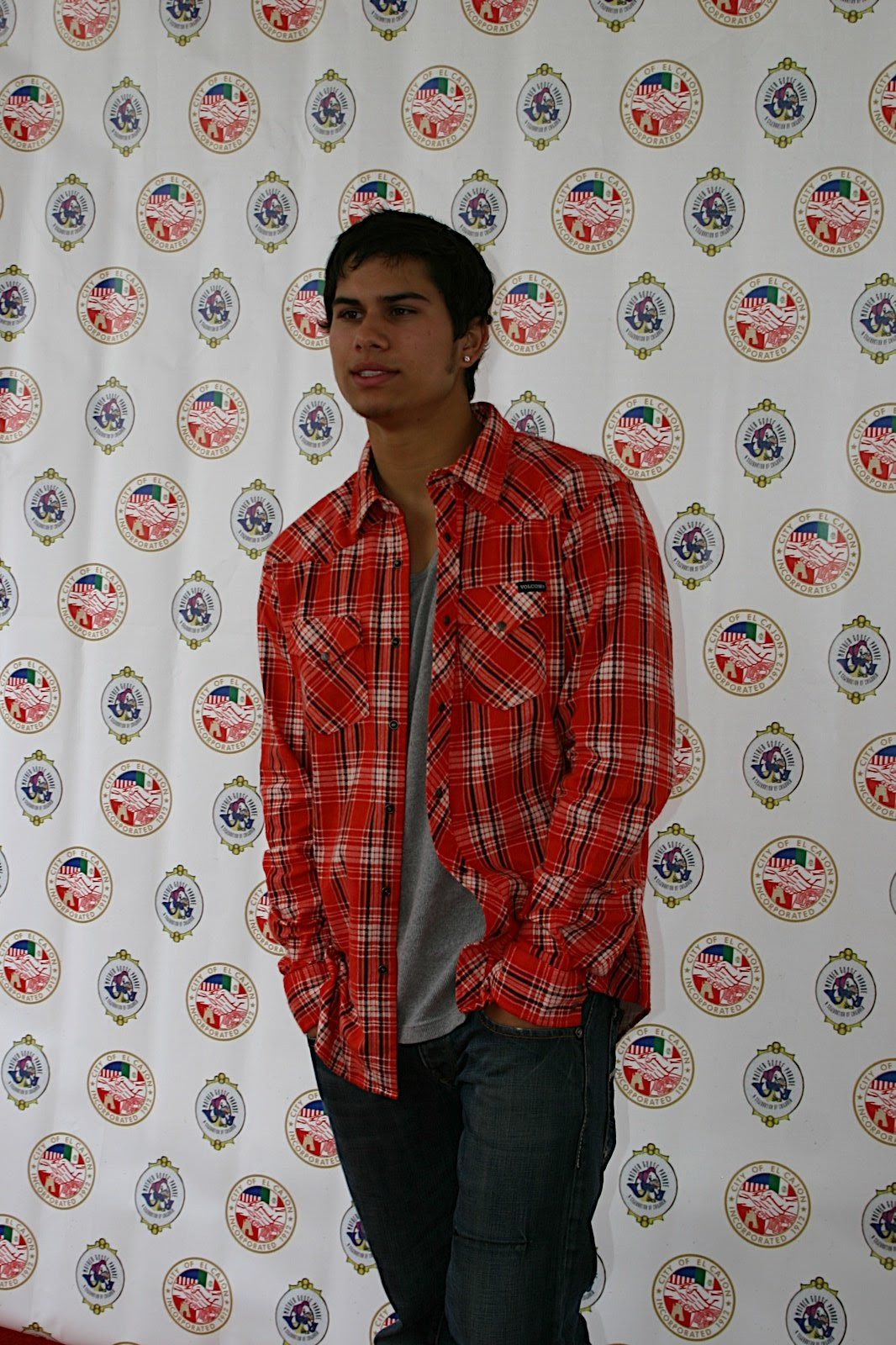
- Raja Fenske in 2008
- Born: Raja Jean Fenske; September 25, 1988 (age 37); Rockville, Maryland, United States
- Other names: RJ Fenske
- Occupation: Actor
- Years active: 2001–present

Raja Jean Fenske (born September 25, 1988) is an American actor who is best known for his role as Jake Behari in Nickelodeon's Unfabulous alongside Emma Roberts and Malese Jow. He is sometimes credited as RJ Fenske.

== Biography ==
Fenske was born in Rockville, Maryland. His mother is Tamil, and is originally from Chennai, India, while on his father's side, he has German and Norwegian ancestry. Fenske attended Thousand Oaks High School in California. In September 2007, he began his freshman year at California State University, Northridge, where he studied BA - Cinema Television Arts - Emphasis Cinematography.

== Career ==
From 2004 to 2007, Fenske played Jake Behari on the Nickelodeon show Unfabulous, including the made for TV movie accompaniment The Best Trip Ever, in which he finally begins a relationship with the show's main star Addie Singer (Emma Roberts).

He has also appeared as a guest star on a number of popular shows such as including Lizzie McGuire, CSI: Miami and 24. His 2003 appearance on CSI: Miami earned him a nomination for the Young Artist Award for 'Best Performance in a TV Drama Series". In 2009, he produced and starred in a short, a thriller named Injustice.

In 2013, Fenske played the lead in a new comedy called Pendejo.

== Filmography ==
Year	Title	Character	Notes
2013	Pendejo	J	Complete
2013	House Party: Tonight's the Night	Young Executive	(video)
2010	Peep World	Rajeev	
2009	Injustice	Detective	(short) (also producer)
2008	Mother Goose Parade	Uncredited	TV movie
2008	Mirror	RJ	(short)
2008	Days of Wrath	Hugo	
2004	Unfabulous	Jake Behari	34 episodes and movie "The Best Trip Ever" Part one and two
2006	Dharini	Abhay	(short)
2004	Spelling Bee	Sanjeep	(short)
2003	Threat Matrix	Young Boy	"Doctor Germ"
2003	Boomtown	Puppet	"Execution" (as RJ Fenske)
2003	24	Asad Ali	"Day 2: 7:00 p.m.-8:00 p.m." (as RJ Fenske)
2002	CSI: Miami	Cameron Medina	"Ashes to Ashes" (as RJ Fenske)
2002	Lizzie McGuire	Li Tarak	"El Oro de Montezuma"
2001	Bubble Boy	Indian Boy	
