= Bonnie Fuller =

Canadian media executive (born 1956)

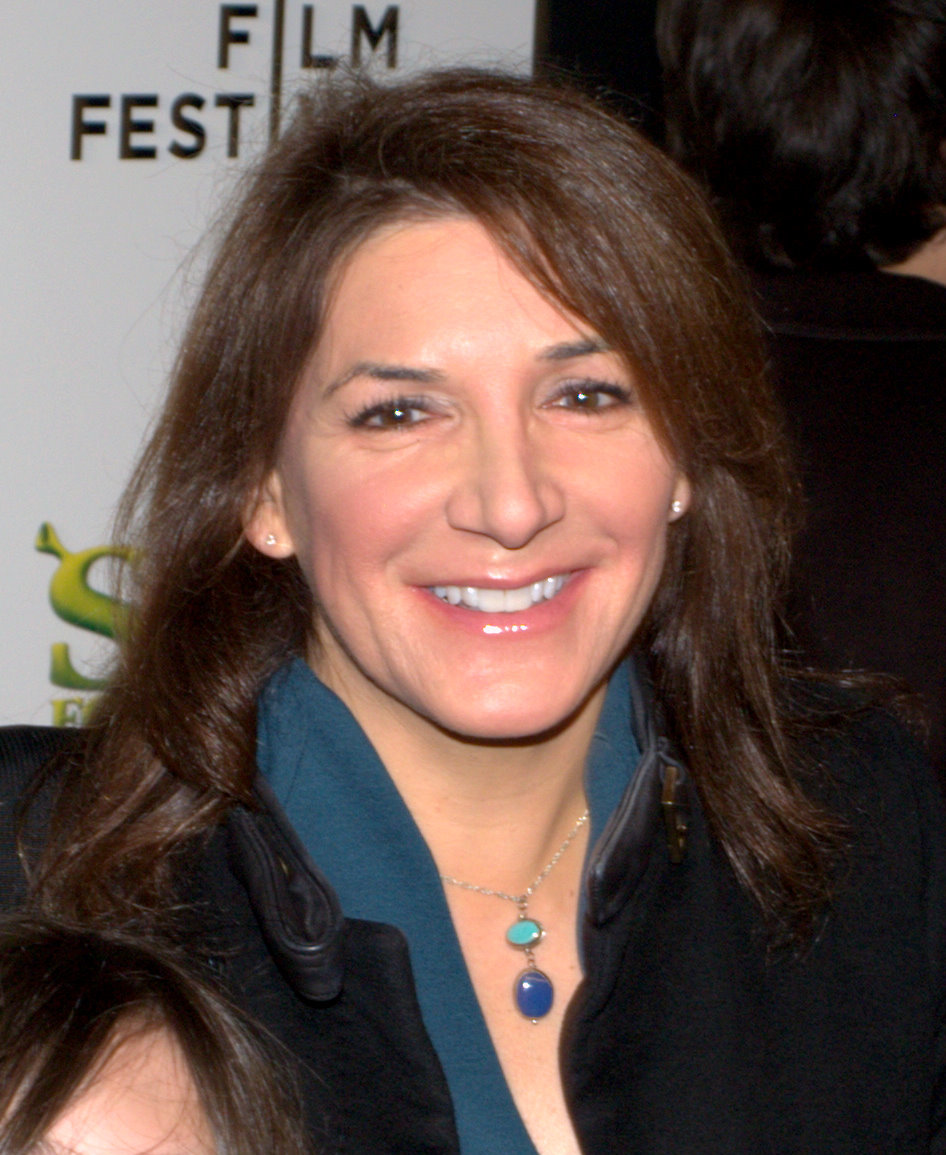
- Fuller at the 2010 Tribeca Film Festival
- Born: Bonnie Hurowitz; September 8, 1956 (age 70); Toronto, Ontario, Canada
- Education: University of Toronto
- Occupations: Editor, writer
- Title: President and editor-in-chief, Hollywood Life
- Spouse: Michael Fuller (m. 1983)
- Children: 4

Bonnie Fuller (born Bonnie Hurowitz; September 8, 1956) is a Canadian media executive who is the owner and editor-in-chief of Hollywood Life. Fuller previously worked as editor-in-chief for publications including YM, Cosmopolitan, Glamour, and Us Weekly.

== Early life ==
Bonnie Hurowitz was born in Toronto, Ontario, to a real-estate lawyer and an elementary school teacher. She is Jewish. She graduated from Jarvis Collegiate Institute in Toronto in 1974 and attended the University of Toronto earning a B.A. degree in 1977.

== Career ==
In 1978, Fuller was a fashion reporter at the Toronto Star. Two years later, she became a sportswear editor for Women's Wear Daily. Her first job as editor-in-chief was in 1983 for Flare, a Canadian national fashion magazine. She worked for five years at the publication prior to joining YM as editor-in-chief.

Fuller launched the American version of Marie Claire magazine in 1994 where she was the editor-in-chief. In 1996, she was appointed editor-in-chief of Cosmopolitan magazine, succeeding Helen Gurley Brown. From 1998 to 2001, she was editor of Glamour magazine. Fuller worked as editor-in-chief of Us Weekly and redesigned the title, creating the modern celebrity newsweekly. She created signature sections such as "Stars Are Just Like Us."

Beginning in July 2003, she served as executive vice president and chief editorial director of American Media Inc., where she oversaw AMI's 16 magazines, including Star, Shape, Natural Health, Country Weekly, and Men's Fitness. During her tenure, Star relaunched from a tabloid to a glossy magazine. Fuller stepped down from her position in May 2008, but remained the editor-at-large at Star and a consultant to AMI. In July 2009 she was hired by Penske Media Corporation to relaunch HollywoodLife.com, a celebrity news site. As of 2019, Fuller is the editor-in-chief of Hollywood Life and a senior advisor to PMC. She hosts the Hollywood Life weekly podcast.

In addition to her roles with Penske Media, she is a frequent contributor to a variety of media outlets including HuffPost, Advertising Age, the Today show, Good Morning America, Access Hollywood, Good Day New York, Inside Edition, Nancy Grace, FOX Digital News, CNN New Day, WPIX, and CTV News. On Tuesday mornings, she appears on Sirius XM Radio's Cosmo Radio. She authored the bestselling book The Joys of Much Too Much: Go for the Big Life — The Great Career, The Perfect Guy, and Everything Else You've Ever Wanted.

In 2021, Fuller purchased full ownership of Hollywood Life from Penske Media.

== Awards and recognition ==
Fuller has twice been named editor of the year by Ad Age.

== Personal life ==
Fuller married Canadian architect Michael Fuller on June 26, 1983. They have four children.
