= List of Angela Anaconda episodes =

The following are summaries of episodes of the Canadian stop-motion animated children's TV series Angela Anaconda, in order of broadcast. The summaries are split by each 11-minute story, which originally aired with another story in a 22-minute episode. Angela Anaconda originally aired for three seasons, from 1999 to 2001. Altogether the series had 65 episodes.

== Series overview ==
Season	Episodes	Originally released	
Season	Episodes	First released	Last released
1	26	October 4, 1999	November 8, 1999
2	25	September 11, 2000	February 26, 2001
3	14	September 10, 2001	December 10, 2001

== Episodes ==
=== KaBlam! shorts (1996) ===
Angela Anaconda first appeared two shorts in the first season of Nickelodeon's Kablam!. "Chew On This" appeared in "Untitled (Why June Refuses To Turn Page?)", while "First Flush of Love" appeared in "Comics of Champions". Due to copyrights being held with WildBrain, the episodes featuring two shorts were not allowed to air on its digital spinoff Nicktoons.

Title	Original release date
"Chew on This"	December 6, 1996
Thanks to Nanette, Angela is forced to scrape gum during a school picnic.
"The First Flush of Love"	December 27, 1996
Angela honors Love Day with her boyfriend, Johnny Abatti.

=== Season 1 (1999) ===
No. overall	No. in season	Title	Original release date
1	1	"Pet Peeves"	October 4, 1999
1	1	"Rat Heroes"	October 4, 1999
"Pet Peeves": When the school trip vote between Nanette's suggestion of Ballet Russe or Angela's suggestion of "Monster Truck Rally" becomes a tie, Nanette proposes that they set up fund-raisers so whoever raises the most money gets to go on their suggestion. Angela, Gina, Johnny and Gordy decide that a "pet wash" is the best way to raise money. "Rat Heroes": The class goes on a trip to the space museum. Angela brings along her dad's space rock which he found in Utah in 1959.
2	2	"Ice Breakers"	October 4, 1999
2	2	"You're So Vain"	October 4, 1999
"Ice Breakers": Angela and her friends join a beginner's ice skating class only to find that not only has Nanette joined as well, but she already knows how to skate; and her show-off moves cause Angela to fall and break her arm. "You're So Vain": When Angela has to write a poem about someone she admires, she selects her terrier King. When she presents the poem to the class, Mrs. Brinks assumes that she is the subject of Angela's poem. Nanette, meanwhile, writes her poem about Marie Antoinette the French Queen (even though Marie Antoinette was Austrian).
3	3	"The Substitute"	October 6, 1999
3	3	"Model Behaviour"	October 6, 1999
"The Substitute": Angela is worried because she did not come up with a topic for her rainforest project, until Mrs. Brinks falls ill, and is replaced by a substitute teacher named Miss. Geraldine "Gerry" Klump. Fortunately for Angela, Ms. Klump is shown to take a shine to her over Nanette. "Model Behaviour": Mr. and Mrs. Manoir hire Geneva Anaconda to carve a sculpture of Nanette. While Nanette is in pose, Angela is ordered around as her personal servant.
4	4	"Touched by an Angel-a"	October 7, 1999
4	4	"Puppy Love"	October 7, 1999
"Touched by an Angel-a": Angela starts getting plagued with bad luck claiming they are all "accidents", despite Josephine Praline's insistence that the jinx is a natural result of not being "touched by an angel" and tries to persuade Angela into being nice to Nanette, despite Josephine herself not finding any good qualities in Nanette. "Puppy Love": Nanette's pampered poodle Ooh La La goes missing and Angela finds him in her backyard - in a love affair with her own terrier dog King!
5	5	"Who's Sari Now?"	October 8, 1999
5	5	"Saving Private Gordy"	October 8, 1999
"Who's Sari Now?": Tapwater Springs Elementary School is visited by Prince Abdul Khalid Jabalasaldin, a wealthy and snobbish prince from Saudi Arabia. Angela wrangles her way into giving the prince a tour of the school where he spends the day mooning over Nanette and getting on Johnny Abatti's nerves. "Saving Private Gordy": When Gordy expresses an interest in football, through horticulture, Coach Rhineheart enlists a few good men (Mark and Derek Anaconda) to help his son grasp the sport's finer points.
6	6	"Fairweather Friends"	October 11, 1999
6	6	"Turtle Confessions"	October 11, 1999
"Fairweather Friends": When Nanette is bedridden with the flu January and Karlene latch onto Angela who is given the job of leader of the spring fling contest and try to bribe her into picking them as her two helpers in order to remain "somebodies" rather than "nobodies". "Turtle Confessions": The only episode set in a framing device, Angela recalls to Josephine Praline how Gina Lash trusted Angela to look after her pet turtle Sheldon but lost him after feeding him too many carrots and bought a new lookalike turtle to replace him.
7	7	"Cloak and Dagger"	October 12, 1999
7	7	"The Dog Ate It"	October 12, 1999
"Cloak and Dagger": Angela and Nanette each get new and nearly identical trench coats. When Angela gets Nanette's coat by mistake, she also finds herself in possession of Nanette's personal diary. "The Dog Ate It": King eats Angela's math homework after it gets covered in bacon grease. Knowing that the truth is clichéd and far-fetched, Angela makes up a story about her dad being sick with some kind of a brain disease.
8	8	"Hot Bob and Chocolate"	October 13, 1999
8	8	"Pizza Wars"	October 13, 1999
"Hot Bob and Chocolate": When Angela makes a mistake in a grammar game, saying, "I love Bob and Hot Chocolate" instead of "Bob and I love Hot Chocolate," Nanette immediately spreads a rumor that Angela likes "Bob." "Pizza Wars": Uncle Nicky and Nona Abatti have a feud with the people from Sabatto's Pizza, their rival pizzeria.
9	9	"Stuck on You"	October 14, 1999
9	9	"Hard to Swallow"	October 14, 1999
"Stuck on You": Angela and Nanette become stuck together by bubble gum by their hair. When Nanette bitterly rejects the idea of having the gum hacked out of her perfectly curled hair, she and Angela have to put up with being stuck together. "Hard to Swallow": When Nanette insists that her poodle's purebred status makes her more loyal, Angela puts this theory to test by luring him away from Nanette's estate and into the Anaconda's backyard. All goes well until Grandma Lou visits with Barney, her new pet alligator.
10	10	"Gone Fishing"	October 15, 1999
10	10	"100 Yard Lash"	October 15, 1999
"Gone Fishing": Angela has been looking forward to joining her father and brothers on their annual fishing trip. However, when a new invention causes him injuries, Angela is stuck going on the trip with Mark and Derek who force her to do all of the dirty work and won't even let her fish. "100 Yard Lash": Gina has no interest in the annual class relay race until she finds out the clue to the top secret prize is initialed M.B. (as in Mapperson's Bakery).
11	11	"My Fair Lulu"	October 18, 1999
11	11	"Johnny Doesn't Live Here Anymore"	October 18, 1999
"My Fair Lulu": Because of Baby Lulu, Angela gets poison ivy, scares off her friends, and misses "All-Creatures-Great-and-Small-Week" at school. The final straw comes when Lulu releases Angela's butterfly from captivity. "Johnny Doesn't Live Here Anymore": When news gets out that Johnny and his parents are moving out of Tapwater Springs, Angela and Nanette throw him competing goodbye parties.
12	12	"Bathroom Blues"	October 19, 1999
12	12	"Garbage Swingers"	October 19, 1999
"Bathroom Blues": Angela finds herself trapped in the boys' bathroom. "Garbage Swingers": Uncle Nicky is doing community service by taking everyone's garbage. Angela and the others enjoy riding in the truck. But Nanette Manoir is determined to spoil their fun.
13	13	"Mapperson's Daughter"	October 20, 1999
13	13	"Big Ho-Down"	October 20, 1999
"Mapperson's Daughter": Mr. Mapperson holds a contest to find a new face for his company's delivery truck. Though Angela and Nanette naturally compete the hardest out of everyone, are either of them who Mr. Mapperson truly has in mind? "Big Ho-Down": Angela is initially embarrassed over the prospect of a father-daughter hoedown, until the competition turns out to be Howell Manoir and Nanette, who have won the dance for two years straight. Now it's a Hoedown Show-Down between the dads and daughters.
14	14	"Rough Times Tables"	October 21, 1999
14	14	"Works of Art"	October 21, 1999
"Rough Times Tables": Mrs. Brinks' class is learning multiplication. While Angela, with help from Gina, breezes through the lessons, Nanette struggles much to everyone's surprise, and Angela's delight. But the tables turn when Angela gets too cocky and Nanette enlists Gina's help with the promise of free food. "Works of Art": Mrs. Brinks is appalled by Angela's true essence of her in art class and unfairly scolds her, so Angela doctors it later much to her classmates' delight. On the way home, Angela realizes that she accidentally left it on her desk instead of her test.
15	15	"Angela Who?"	October 22, 1999
15	15	"Rockabye Abatti"	October 22, 1999
"Angela Who?": Angela has many qualities that none of her family members do, causing her to feel alienated from the Anaconda family, so she sets out to find who she really is related to. "Rockabye Abatti": When Johnny gets a new bunk bed, Angela takes advantage of his sleepover invitation in hopes of getting a good night sleep.
16	16	"Green with Envy"	October 25, 1999
16	16	"Two Can Play"	October 25, 1999
"Green with Envy": Angela is so excited about wearing her new 'highway-worker-orange' windbreaker to school she completely forgets that it is St. Patrick's Day. According to Tapwater Springs' tradition you can pinch anyone not wearing green and when Angela arrives at school that morning everyone in her class can hardly wait until recess time to take advantage of Angela's forgetfulness. "Two Can Play": Angela becomes Nanette's understudy for Mrs. Brinks' "Miss Manners the Musical". Knowing that Nanette would never give up the limelight, Angela forgoes her duties. But when Nanette catches a cold and Angela's power smoothies do more harm than good, it looks like the limelight is Angela's for the taking.
17	17	"Cut to the Chase"	October 26, 1999
17	17	"Dirty Work"	October 26, 1999
"Cut to the Chase": The prospect of a bad picture day haircut leads Angela to "borrow" her brother's autographed baseball hat. When the hat gets confiscated and claimed by Nanette, Angela embarks on a series of deals to get it back. "Dirty Work": Johnny and Angela get to run the school store. When Johnny becomes sick, Nanette steps in to fill his place, much to Angela's dismay.
18	18	"Super Mom"	October 27, 1999
18	18	"Skipping Lessons"	October 27, 1999
"Super Mom": Geneva's creative block is taking a toll on her skills as a mom. After commandeering Angela's homework (resulting in an F), she gives up art and devotes her time into being the perfect mother. But is all the fresh-squeezed orange juice, plastic wrapped furniture, and handmade clothes worth it if nobody is happy, especially Geneva? "Skipping Lessons": Because of all the commendation letters from Mrs. Brinks, Nanette gets moved up to the fourth grade. In a fit of transference, Angela takes Nanette's place as Mrs. Brinks' favorite student. However, as Mrs. Brinks' attention becomes unbearable, Angela begins to wonder if having Nanette around isn't as bad as she thought.
19	19	"View to a Brinks"	October 28, 1999
19	19	"Injury to Insult"	October 28, 1999
"View to a Brinks": Looking to confirm once and for all that Mr. and Mrs. Brinks are weekend nudists, Angela and her friends attempt to rebuild their treehouse higher and higher until it surpasses the fence and Gordy's topiary, thus assuring them the best seats in the house. "Injury to Insult": Angela comes down with Pink Eye and gets to wear an eyepatch. Not to be outdone, Nanette shows up the next day in a wheelchair, claiming that Angela stepped on and crushed her dancing toe; this not only reassures her popularity, but also Angela's servitude at Mrs. Brinks' insistence.
20	20	"The Martyrdom of St. Nanette"	October 29, 1999
20	20	"The Crossing"	October 29, 1999
"The Martyrdom of St. Nanette": After Josephine teaches the class about Ash Wednesday, Nanette, wanting her memory to live on for eternity, suggests that the entire class participate in sacrificing something for forty days. While Angela gives up imagining things about other people, Nanette embarks on a superficial vow of poverty. "The Crossing": Sherman the class chicken escapes his box and Angela convinced Mrs. Jenerette, the school crossing guard to help get him back, much to Nanette's inconvenience. As a result, the beloved crossing guard is fired at Mrs. Manoir's whim. Wracked with guilt, Angela helps Mrs. Jenerette try to get re-employed.
21	21	"Labor Pains"	October 30, 1999
21	21	"Cyrano d'Angela"	October 30, 1999
"Labor Pains": Angela goes on a chore strike when she realizes that her allowance is the lowest in town. "Cyrano d'Angela": Gina's heart seemingly has gone to Jimmy Jamal, much to Gordy's deep dismay. All hope seems lost until Angela discovers that Gina and Jimmy's affair rests on not what goes on in the latter's heart, but his lunchbox.
22	22	"Crazed and Confused"	October 31, 1999
22	22	"Strange Bedfellows"	October 31, 1999
"Crazed and Confused": "Babble Balls" were all the rage in Tapwater Springs--until Angela had enough money buy one. Now she comes to learn from Nanette and the other kids that it's "Bug Thugs" which are currently 'da bomb'. "Strange Bedfellows": Grandma Lou comes for a visit and Angela goes to great lengths to make sure they room together. But between the boring stories, the snoring, and waking up face to face with Grandma Lou's detachable leg. Angela's dream roommate turns out to be a nightmare.
23	23	"Everybody Loves Gina"	November 3, 1999
23	23	"Halls of Justice"	November 3, 1999
"Everybody Loves Gina": Gina Lash comes to Angela's house for a sleepover. However, things go out of plan when Angela's family starts paying more attention and idolism to Gina rather than Angela herself. "Halls of Justice": Distracted by an orange sash and delusions of grandeur, Angela volunteers for hall monitor duties, and quickly learns of its drawbacks. This is especially true when she incurs the wrath of Nanette, whom she cites for littering
24	24	"Cabin Fever"	November 4, 1999
24	24	"Don't Overdue It"	November 4, 1999
"Cabin Fever": Josephine Praline reveals that her mother has agoraphobia. Angela tries to use this as an excuse to avoid not only school, but Mrs. Brinks's chalk erasers. "Don't Over-Due It": Angela misses her chance to return a copy of Happy Hoppy Bunny to the library and not get fined. Angela tries all attempts to sneak the book back into the library without either Miss Yamagotchi or Nanette noticing.
25	25	"Kar-Lean on Me"	November 7, 1999
25	25	"Slice of Life"	November 7, 1999
"Kar-Lean on Me": After Karlene fails to buy a hat made of real fur, January and Nanette instantly break off their friendship with her. A shocked Karlene then starts constantly leaning on Angela and co. and they invite Karlene into their gang. However, it is unclear whether Karlene is true friends with Angela or not. "Slice of Life": Uncle Nicky and Nona decide to make a commercial to attract more people to Abatti's Pizza. Who will be the child actor stars in the new commercial: Angela, Gina, Johnny and Gordy or Nanette, January and Karlene?
26	26	"The Nanette Lock"	November 8, 1999
26	26	"Gordy Floats"	November 8, 1999
"The Nanette Lock": Angela accidentally invents a new swinging craze. However, Nanette takes credit for it and names it the "Nanette Lock". "Gordy Floats": The people of Tapwater Springs have to design floats and everyone, except Gordy, is finding this easy.

=== Season 2 (2000–01) ===
No. overall	No. in season	Title	Original release date
27	1	"Vicious Cycle"	September 11, 2000
27	1	"To Catch a Thief"	September 11, 2000
"Vicious Cycle": Angela is not looking forward to the annual bicycle race. While she's stuck with her brother's hand me down bikes, Nanette rides the best bikes money can buy, and naturally rides rings around her and the competition. This year seems to be no different, until Angela stumbles upon an unidentifiable wallet containing enough money to buy a top quality bike. "To Catch a Thief": Tapwater Springs erupts into uproar after the Manoirs have several of their possessions stolen from them.
28	2	"French Connection"	September 18, 2000
28	2	"The List"	September 18, 2000
"French Connection": The Anacondas get a Parisienne foreign exchange student called CiCi LeCreme who becomes friends with Nanette yet refuses to invite CiCi to her own house (under claims that their house is being fumigated for fleas). "The List": After getting into an ice skating accident, Angela becomes furious when everyone, even her friends, start joking with her because of it. She hides in the toilets and writes a list of jibes about everyone "who annoyed her" on a roll of toilet paper. When Nanette discovers the list, she starts blackmailing Angela into doing chores for her with it.
29	3	"A Bug Responsibility"	September 25, 2000
29	3	"Pogo-A-Go-Go"	September 25, 2000
"A Bug Responsibility": Josephine Praline lends Angela her collection of insects to mind for her. However, Angela may not be capable of such a big responsibility. "Pogo-A-Go-Go": Angela starts practicing using a pogostick, something which she is very bad at.
30	4	"Snow Mercy"	October 2, 2000
30	4	"Be-Trayed"	October 2, 2000
"Snow Mercy": Nanette tricks Johnny into being on her side during a snowball fight with Angela. "Be-Trayed": When the school's "dump your lunch not your tray" policy causes Mrs. Brinks' class to lose recess, Angela admits to the crime, despite her innocence.
31	5	"Earhart's Heirloom"	October 9, 2000
31	5	"Ancient Greeks"	October 9, 2000
"Earhart's Heirloom": Mrs. Brinks promises to show the class her family heirloom, a compass belonging to Amelia Earhart, if they behave for at least 30 days. Just as Mrs. Brinks is about to show them the compass, Angela accidentally ruins the deal by chewing on bubblegum. Angela then formulates a plan to make it up to Mrs. Brinks with her birthday. "Ancient Greeks": Nanette writes a "three-act Greek tragedy" casting all of the students in roles. Angela's plan to use reverse psychology in hopes of getting the part of Hercules backfires when Nanette casts the role to Gordy Rhinehart. Instead, Angela gets cast in a variety of other roles, including Medusa, Prometheus and Atlas due to Nanette's displeasure in Angela's acting performance.
32	6	"Brinks of No Return"	October 16, 2000
32	6	"Operation Ringside"	October 16, 2000
"Brinks of No Return": Angela is forced to stay at Mrs. Brinks' house when her family fails to pick her up due to a rainstorm. Once at Mrs. Brinks' house, Angela and Mr. Brinks are slaved around by Mrs. Brinks while she does nothing, and to make matters worse, Nanette has arrived. "Operation Ringside": Coach Rhinehart has a new and unknown job, one which has been cutting into quality time between him and Gordy for the past month. Coincidentally, a wrestler known as the Masked Menace has begun a meteoric month-long rise through the local wrestling circuit. Angela and her friends try to figure out whether or not Coach Rhinehart and the Masked Menace are the same person.
33	7	"Eating with the Enemy"	October 23, 2000
33	7	"Brocc-Fest"	October 23, 2000
"Eating with the Enemy": Mr. Manoir learns about Bill Anaconda's latest $20-winning invention, the Food Rejuvenator 3000, which turns dried fruit back into fresh fruit. He offers to invest money into it if it impresses him. Gen and Bill reluctantly invite the Manoirs for dinners. "Brocc-Fest": At the Tapwater Springs Broccoli Festival, Mrs. Brinks and Coach Rhinehart are mesmerized at Angela's painting of a broccoli inspired by Baby Lulu's bonnet. Angela then faces the prospect of becoming "Keeper of the Broccoli" when, in fact, she hates broccoli.
34	8	"All for One"	October 30, 2000
34	8	"Uncle Nicky's Midlife Crisis"	October 30, 2000
"All for One": Angela gets paired with Nanette on a nature hike. "Uncle Nicky's Midlife Crisis": After finding a gray hair on his chest, Uncle Nicky believes himself to be turning old and goes out of his way to act young.
35	9	"Oh the Hu-manatees"	November 6, 2000
35	9	"In a Pepper Pickle"	November 6, 2000
"Oh the Humanatees": At the town's annual Save the Manatees auction, local hero Astronaut Bob offers himself as a last minute prize. Angela, having lost her chance to win a space helmet to Nanette, is the highest bidder. But Nanette schemes her way into Astronaut Bob's heart and manages to thwart any and all of Angela's attempts to have fun. "In a Pepper Pickle": An unscrewed pepper shaker lid prank against Mark and Derek backfires against Angela and she has to go to school with a nose full of itchy pepper.
36	10	"Boo-Who?"	November 13, 2000
36	10	"The Haunting Of Angela Anaconda"	November 13, 2000
"Boo-Who?": Angela is planning on going trick or treating with her friends but can't risk wearing one of her mother's homemade costumes, so she orders an "Astro-Nutties" costume in the mail. "The Haunting Of Angela Anaconda": On Halloween night, Angela decides to give Mark and Derek a scare. When the lights start flickering and strange, howling noises echo through Angela's garage, Angela wonders if her garage is really haunted or if it is just Mark and Derek playing usual tricks.
37	11	"The Lion, the Witch and the Weasel?"	November 20, 2000
37	11	"Curse of the Mummy"	November 20, 2000
"The Lion, the Witch and the Weasel": At the zoo, Angela is chosen to do an assignment on the weasel, an animal that hasn't been seen since 1987. "Curse of the Mummy": At the museum, the mummy of King Tutankhamun falls on Angela, giving her what appears to be bad luck.
38	12	"No Thanksgiving"	November 27, 2000
38	12	"Family Tree"	November 27, 2000
"No Thanksgiving": When her family gets sick from Nanette's visit, it's up to Angela to cook Thanksgiving dinner. "Family Tree": As a school project, Angela must trace her roots to see if her ancestors were of any significance to Tapwater Springs, even to see if Angela was related to the people who owned Miss Netty, the cow who saved Tapwater Springs from a wildfire on February 11, 1901. Angela eventually finds out that the Manoir family owned Miss Netty, but through pieces of a photo, she discovers that the cow was actually the one who started the fire.
39	13	"Goodbye Mrs. Brinks"	December 4, 2000
39	13	"The Birdlady of Tapwater Springs"	December 4, 2000
"Goodbye Mrs. Brinks": Mrs. Brinks reveals that she plans on leaving when the school is visited by Dr. Danny Fanny. To make sure Mrs. Brinks leaves, Angela, Gina, Johnny and Gordy dress in neat clothes and act good. To make sure Mrs Brinks stays, Nanette, January and Karlene dress up as punks, nickname themselves "Bruiser" (Nanette) "Cheeky" (January) and "Grunt" (Karlene) and act bad. "The Birdlady of Tapwater Springs": After Angela revives an unconscious bird, everyone thinks she has "healing powers" and is given a variety of problems to "heal." However, Nanette is the only who thinks Angela's healing powers are fake and tries to exploit it, only to find herself in trouble with Mrs. Brinks.
40	14	"Secret Santa"	December 11, 2000
40	14	"Hooray for Chanukah"	December 11, 2000
"Secret Santa": The class picks Secret Santas for Christmas. When Angela picks Nanette much to her chagrin, she must decide between buying a bottle of "toilet water" or a toaster for French toast. "Hooray for Chanukah": Uncle Nicky accidentally loses Gina Lash's great-grandmother's menorah in a game of dreidel and Angela, Gina, Johnny and Gordy go on a crusade from place to place to retrieve the menorah in time for the Chanukah party.
41	15	"Return to Sender"	December 18, 2000
41	15	"I Wanna Mold Your Band"	December 18, 2000
"Return to Sender": The class each get a pen pal, and Angela gets Marie Antoinette from France as hers. When Marie Antoinette's letters turn malicious, Angela begins to suspect Nanette is responsible. "I Wanna Mold Your Band": Mr. Tastee Twirl hosts a talent contest which the winner will get to ride around in the truck and ring the bell. Angela and Her Band-Aconda compete against Nanette's girl group, the Ooh La La La Lahs.
42	16	"Don't be Caddie"	December 25, 2000
42	16	"The Pup Who Would Be King"	December 25, 2000
"Don't be Caddie": Angela and her friends try to keep cool during the hottest day in Tapwater Springs. When they stumble across the member's only pool at the town country club, Angela and her friends wind up "helping" Mark and Derek with their jobs as caddies. "The Pup Who Would Be King": King gives birth to a litter of puppies, one of which looks exactly like her, which Angela names King II. However, to Angela's shock, King II gets adopted by Mrs Brinks and renamed as Princess.
43	17	"Cheese Under Pressure"	January 1, 2001
43	17	"Troop or Consequences"	January 1, 2001
"Cheese Under Pressure": Angela tries to find the perfect food in order to trade off her liverwurst sandwiches. Nothing she tries seems to work until a can of Squiggly Cheese changes her lunchtime fortunes change for the better. "Troop or Consequences": Gordy is recruited into the Junior Ranger-ettes by Angela and Gina in their efforts to keep January and Karlene from electing Nanette as troop leader.
44	18	"The Great Granny Grudge"	January 8, 2001
44	18	"News at Eleven"	January 8, 2001
"The Great Granny Grudge": After taking Grandma Lou to Abatti's Pizza for lunch, it is revealed that Grandma Lou and Nona Abatti have had a lifelong feud and even go so far as to prevent Angela and Johnny from being friends. "News at Eleven": Nanette is unsurprisingly chosen as head anchor when Mrs. Brinks' class is chosen to do a newscast for the town's community-access channel. Angela, by contrast, is given the farm report. All seems lost until one of Farmer Jangels' goats gives birth to six kids.
45	19	"The Girl with All the Answers"	January 15, 2001
45	19	"Good Seats"	January 15, 2001
"The Girl with All the Answers": Gina is one gold star away from being crowned Q&A Queen and defeating Nanette in the process. When Gina eats too much the night before the final competition, the crown is as good as Nanette's, until Angela stumbles upon the teacher's edition of their textbook. Angela would love to become the new Q&A Queen though in her heart she knows that Gina truly deserves the coronation. "Good Seats": Angela and her friends win free tickets to the movie Interstellar Mega Giants vs. Mechanataur, (Note: "Good Seats" was originally released as the opening short for Digimon: The Movie, which was first screened in North American theaters on October 6, 2000. After the short was repurposed for the television series, all dialogue mentioning Digimon was changed into Interstellar Mega Giants vs. Mechanataur.) but obstacles prevent her from finding the best seats in the theaters.
46	20	"Abra-Abatti"	January 22, 2001
46	20	"Stupid Cupid"	January 22, 2001
"Abra-Abatti": After assisting a magician during his performance, Johnny begins his own routine with the assistance of Gina. But when Gina is a no-show, Angela and Nanette compete to fill her place. "Stupid Cupid": Angela's attempt to play Cupid for Gordy backfires big time when Gina's mom Liz and Coach Rhinehart strike up a romance which negatively impacts everyone in town.
47	21	"Gordy in a Plastic Bubble"	January 29, 2001
47	21	"Camp Anaconda"	January 29, 2001
"Gordy in a Plastic Bubble": After looking at an eyelash under a microscope and spotting a microbe on it, Gordy becomes mysophobic and refuses to leave the house. "Camp Anaconda": After dropping out of "Camp Connie", Angela, Gina, Johnny and Gordy stay at the Anaconda's home which they rename as "Camp Anaconda". Camp Anaconda however seems to be even worse, as Angela's brothers won't let them do anything at all.
48	22	"Sound of Silence"	February 5, 2001
48	22	"Johnny Learns to Swing"	February 5, 2001
"Sound of Silence": Football season is canceled when Coach Rhinehart loses his voice. Not only does this provide Mark and Derek with ample time to torture Angela, but the team loses the next game (courtesy of Gordy Rinehart’s words-of-wisdom). Angela must find a way to get the coach healthy again. "Johnny Learns to Swing": When Johnny finds that he has grown his "first ever Abatti chest hair", Uncle Nicky begins to pressure Johnny into manhood. After a "crash course in coolness", Johnny's reemergence as "John-O" slowly begins to disgust Angela and her friends.
49	23	"Firm-a-Foam"	February 12, 2001
49	23	"For the Love of the Game"	February 12, 2001
"Firm-a-Foam": Angela looks forward to spending Take Your Kids to Work Day helping her father Bill with his inventions. Instead, she assists her father at his day job as a traveling salesman selling expandable foam. "For the Love of the Game": Jimmy Jamal goes away and trusts Angela to keep his "Slamboy" game for him until he returns. However, Nanette takes the batteries, causing Jimmy's saved game to be lost, and Angela must get Jimmy's game back.
50	24	"Jiggly Fruit Classic"	February 19, 2001
50	24	"Race Car Race"	February 19, 2001
"Jiggly Fruit Classic": The evil Jiggly Fruit mascot Jiggly James announces that Jiggly Fruit will be replaced by "New Jiggly Fruit" which tastes disgusting. Angela, Gina and even Mrs Brinks go out of their way to protest against New Jiggly Fruit and bring back old Jiggly Fruit, even going so far as to replace Mrs. Brinks' lectures with protest periods and masquerading as the "Jiggly Angels". "Race Car Race": Johnny gets into an accident preparing for the soapbox racecar derby. Disappointed with himself, Johnny is convinced he has lost his racing magic and Angela must take the wheel.
51	25	"Surf's Up"	February 26, 2001
51	25	"Dog Gone It"	February 26, 2001
"Surf's Up": Mrs. Lash takes Angela and her friends to the beach. The four of them are thrilled to be out of school and on the shore; until Nanette and her posse show up to spoil their fun. To make matters worse, Mrs. Brinks is a volunteer lifeguard. "Dog Gone It": Angela and her friends must save Mark and Derek's softball from a possessive neighborhood dog named Carnivorous.

=== Season 3 (2001) ===
No. overall	No. in season	Title	Original release date
52	1	"Childhood for Sale"	September 10, 2001
52	1	"The Best Is Yeti to Come"	September 10, 2001
"Childhood for Sale": To cover the damage done to Mrs. Brink's window, Angela takes Uncle Nicky's advice and decides to sell some of her stuff. But as nostalgia makes her "keep" pile grow and grow, Angela must choose between parting with her belongings or the prospect of working off the debt. "The Best Is Yeti to Come": On a family picnic, Angela is convinced that she has photographed an elusive yeti. When nobody believes her, she decides to stake out the park.
53	2	"Canine to Five"	September 17, 2001
53	2	"Yellow Book Road"	September 17, 2001
"Canine to Five": Angela exploits her friends when her new dog walking job becomes more than she had bargained for. "Yellow Book Road": At the book mobile, Bunny Manoir attempts to have The Wizard of Oz banned on the grounds that it promotes wizardry and witchcraft.
54	3	"Jimmy Jamal, Super Beetle"	September 24, 2001
54	3	"I'm With Stupid"	September 24, 2001
"Jimmy Jamal, Super Beetle": Jimmy Jamal's obsession with Super Beetle takes a turn for the annoying when he begins to dress and act like him at school. Johnny tries to get him to snap out of it, only to come back as his sidekick Crazy Cricket the next day. When Sherman, the class chicken goes missing and Angela gets the blame, it's up to Johnny and Jimmy to either save the day or hang up their capes for good. "I'm With Stupid": To liven up her show-and-tell reports, Angela brings in Mr. Mooey, a cow puppet. Between Mr. Mooey's caustic sense of humor and cow related puns, he proves to be a hit with Mrs. Brinks' class, so much so to the point where Angela begins to find herself overshadowed and ignored by everyone around her.
55	4	"Saturday Night Gordy"	October 1, 2001
55	4	"Derek's Better Half"	October 1, 2001
"Saturday Night Gordy": Angela and Gordy are partnered for the school dance. When Gordy proves himself to be a dancing god, Connie Brinks offers the two of them a chance to dance on his local television show. Angela is all for it, until the fame goes to Gordy's head and he transforms into the ultimate diva: Gordy Glitterdust. "Derek's Better Half": Angela hits it off well with her new "youth companion" Raven Schwartz, an art student in one of Geneva's classes. Mark ultimately comes to be smitten with Raven and the two go steady, much to the chagrin of not only Angela, but Derek as well.
56	5	"There Goes the Neighborhood"	October 8, 2001
56	5	"Open All Night"	October 8, 2001
"There Goes the Neighborhood": Angela is the first to meet the new neighbors, particularly a boy named Stuart Wu. He seems cool at first, and Angela arranges for him to meet her friends. As she helps Stu unpack, he reveals himself as prone to being rude. "Open All Night": After a water main bursts under the Anaconda house, Angela develops a devastatingly awful case of insomnia. Her friends try various schemes to get her sleep, each of which end disastrously.
57	6	"Pranks for the Memories"	October 15, 2001
57	6	"Space Camp"	October 15, 2001
"Pranks for the Memories": After one unwarranted punishment from Mrs. Brinks too many, Angela decides to give in and become the troublemaker everyone thinks she is. As master troublemakers, Mark and Derek become Angela's prank consultants, and the school is turned on its ear. "Space Camp": At Astronaut Bob's space camp, everyone has high hopes of becoming a junior astronaut. Since there is only room for one junior astronaut, Astronaut Bob puts the kids through a series of competitions.
58	7	"The Curse of Baby Lulu"	October 22, 2001
58	7	"Funny Photos"	October 22, 2001
"The Curse of Baby Lulu": Bill and Geneva are aghast when they hear Baby Lulu cursing and all evidence seems to point towards Angela as the culprit. "Funny Photos": Angela and her friends find out that the "funny photos" section of their town paper is not only humorous, but profitable. When their funny faces fail, the four of them orchestrate "accidents" hoping to cash in on the funny photo reward.
59	8	"Nonna's Lib"	October 29, 2001
59	8	"All My Students"	October 29, 2001
"Nonna's Lib": At the library book sale, Nonna Abatti stumbles upon "Cry of the She-Wolf", a feminist manifesto. A few chapters in, Nonna comes to the conclusion that as a woman, she has been taken advantage of and closes Abatti's Pizzeria for good. "All My Students": A jubilee is planned in honor of Mrs. Brinks' teaching career, and Angela is in charge of finding tribute acts. The problem is that none of her students have any fond memories of her teaching. When all hope seems lost, Angela stumbles upon an old yearbook with an inscription of "love always" from Corey Cray, a soap opera idol and former student of Mrs. Brinks.
60	9	"Snow Day"	November 5, 2001
60	9	"The Puck Stops Here"	November 5, 2001
"Snow Day": When a snowy day cancels classes at Tapwater Elementary, Angela and her friends spend their snow day trying to find the perfect place to toboggan. "The Puck Stops Here": Angela's tendency to daydream causes her to get hit with a hockey puck, thus instilling a fear of hockey altogether. To help Angela conquer her fear of ice hockey, her friends decide to each conquer their respective fears.
61	10	"Diving Miss Angela"	November 12, 2001
61	10	"Window Pain"	November 12, 2001
"Diving Miss Angela": A class trip to OceanWorld prompts Angela to take an interest in marine biology. "Window Pain": The Anacondas apply to pose inside a giant glass cabinet at the local museum to show a "modern day family". It seem to go well, until people begin seeing the family's more embarrassing habits.
62	11	"Part-Time Jerks"	November 19, 2001
62	11	"Out on a Limb"	November 19, 2001
"Part-Time Jerks": After almost stealing burgers from Budgie Burger, Mark and Derek become employed to avoid getting criminal records and earn enough wage to pay Kimmy the manager back. "Out on a Limb": The oldest oak tree in Tapwater Springs is slated to be torn down in favor of a shopping mall at Mr. Manoir's whim. When Angela decides to climb the tree and can't come down, she finds herself unwittingly leading a protest movement to save the tree.
63	12	"Enter the Angela"	November 26, 2001
63	12	"If the Shoe Fits"	November 26, 2001
"Enter the Angela": Angela is sick of Mark and Derek forcing her into smelling their dirty laundry and looks to Coach Rhinehart for some martial arts training. After Angela learns to "flip" people even her friends avoid her in fear, thinking she is a bully. "If the Shoe Fits": Angela accidentally steals a pair of "Orange Stompers" from the shoe shop and faces all of the obstacles and consequences to smuggle the stompers back into the shop and retrieve her old shoes.
64	13	"Sir Ducksworthy"	December 3, 2001
64	13	"Speak No Evil"	December 3, 2001
"Sir Ducksworthy": Johnny's ill-fated attempt to save his sock puppet, Sir Ducksworthy, lands him in the hospital. Now more than ever, Johnny needs Sir Ducksworthy by his side. Angela tries to make a replacement puppet, which causes bad luck. "Speak No Evil": To show her solidarity with local broccoli farmers, Josephine has taken a vow of silence to protest the ongoing drought. Sensing that Angela is unable to answer a question in class, Gina blurts out that Angela is also taking a vow of silence to protest poor teacher wages. Not only does keeping quiet become more difficult than it seems, a recent rainstorm releases Josephine from her vows; and she can think of many ways to use her voice that may get Angela talking.
65	14	"The Non-Fight"	December 10, 2001
65	14	"Driving Me Crazy"	December 10, 2001
"The Non-Fight": Geneva gets into a fight with her friend Cokie Fowler. In order to avoid a similar fate, Angela and Gina become closer than ever, a move that strains their friendship. They stop speaking to each other which worsens the situation because they can't discuss their problems. "Driving Me Crazy": As part of an opening day promotion, a new toy store is raffling off a motorized car to whoever wins. Gina, Johnny and Gordy leave their tickets with Angela, who wins the raffle.
