= Dark Mirror (2007 film) =

- Promotional film poster
- Directed by: Pablo Proenza
- Written by: Pablo Proenza; Matthew Reynolds
- Produced by: Erin Ploss-Campoamor; Ralf Weinfurtner
- Starring: Lisa Vidal; David Chisum; Joshua Pelegrin
- Cinematography: Armando Salas
- Edited by: Todd Bush; Pablo Proenza
- Music by: Pieter A. Schlosser; Isaac Sprintis
- Distributed by: IFC Films
- Release date: July 27, 2007 (New York International Latino Film Festival)
- Country: United States
- Language: English

Dark Mirror is a 2007 psychological horror film, which was directed by Pablo Proenza, and stars Lisa Vidal, David Chisum, Christine Lakin, Lupe Ontiveros and Joshua Pelegrin, with a cameo by Daeg Faerch.

== Plot ==
A family of three, mother Deborah (Lisa Vidal), father Jim (David Chisum) and son Ian (Joshua Pelegrin) move to L.A. from Seattle after Deb is entranced by a house with beautiful glass pane windows. As the family settles in, Deb attempts to resume her career as a photographer while simultaneously taking care of her son as Jim is usually working late. After having some strange experiences with the mirrors and windows in the house, she talks to her chatty neighbor, who tells her a famous artist and his family used to reside there until they mysteriously disappeared. Her mother also visits and tells Deb that in Feng Shui window panes are used to trap evil spirits and stop them from harming anyone.

Yet, as Deb continues to experience strange occurrences and explores the dark history of the house, she becomes convinced that something evil resides within the mirrors and windows. When the interviewer who makes fun of Deb is killed, followed by a woman who shouts at Deb for damaging her car while parking, and then the lurking old neighbour woman, Deb realizes that everyone she takes snapshots of with her camera dies, and the bodies go missing. She is convinced that the evil spirit has infiltrated her camera lens and is killing people. She tells this to her husband, but he thinks she's sick. She shows him a mysterious door that does not exist but is seen in the mirror only. Jim, being tired, gets confused and tells her to discuss it with him the next day. Her mother, however, believes her and guides her.

In her chimney, she finds a painting of the previous owner's wife along with a diary, reading which Deb finds out that the wife (Elenor) of previous owner Rupert Wills (a painter) was also a painter and her husband was selling her paintings in his own name because Rupert's paintings were not good enough to sell. Elenor was scared of her husband and he made her a prisoner in the house. Elenor kept drawing things and the things soon started to become reality due to the evil trapping mirrors in the house. She kept looking for the exit but couldn't find any. One day Jim is talking formally to the beautiful neighbour Tammy, but when Deb sees them through a glass window she sees them as flirting; she gets mad at Tammy and takes a snapshot of her with her camera. At night she smokes and falls asleep. In her dream she sees Tammy dying. When she wakes up, she's sure about the camera and looks for it. She finds it in her son's room with pictures of him and Jim. She freaks out and breaks the camera. When the camera lens still glitters, she realizes that it is the mirror that houses the evil spirit.

She looks for the diary and tries to find the escape/exit. She finds a hidden safe in a wall and there is a gun in it. She sees someone around the house and shoots him, but the person turns out to be Jim. He ties her up and tells her that she's been killing everyone. Deb tells him about Elenor and Rupert, but Jim does not believe her. In the morning when Jim and Ian are sleeping, Deb's mother wakes and unties her and she goes to the mirror, where she finds out that it is Elenor who's trapped in the mirror and killing people using Deb's body. She kills Jim walking through the mirrors, and is going to kill Ian when Deb stabs herself, killing Elenor as well. She takes Jim's body and herself to the mysterious door and winds up disappearing like the other bodies.

The police are confused by seeing blood trails ending at a wall. A female police officer takes picture of the mirror and sees a ghost, implying that Elenor still exists and has possessed the policewoman.

== Release ==
The film premiered at the New York International Latino Film Festival in 2007 and was released by IFC Films on November 3, 2008 direct to video.

== Reception ==
DVD Talk said, "The first half hour of the film feels a little bit choppy but once the plot is established and moving along, we wind up with a reasonably claustrophobic movie that makes good use of its location by way of some great camera work and strong sound design." Dread Central said, "In the end Dark Mirror is an admirable shot for first-time director Proenza, and fans of ghostly thrillers will certainly find something to like, but the lack of energy, creativity and real scares ensure it utterly fails to rise above the rest of the crop."
