= Joanna Ferrone =

American writer and author

- Born: 1949 or 1950 (age 76–77)
- Occupations: Writer, author
- Known for: Fido Dido (1985); Angela Anaconda (1996, 1999–2001)

Joanna Ferrone is an American writer and author. She is best known for co-creating the character Fido Dido with Sue Rose. Ferrone and Rose also created Angela Anaconda, which Ferrone describes as a reflection of her upbringing.

== Life and career ==
Ferrone was the third of eight children, raised in the Catholic faith but Ferrone would later describe herself as agnostic. She was raised in Oyster Bay, New York. Growing up, she described herself as the "consummate tomboy". She is a lesbian, and describes herself as her family's "only gay child". In an interview, Ferrone expressed her previous feelings that had she been born another time, she would have transitioned. Ferrone was heavily involved in the New York queer arts scene of the 1970s and 1980s. She cited queer pop art influences such as Jean-Michel Basquiat and Keith Haring as central to her and Sue Rose's practice. At the time of Fido Dido's creation, Ferrone worked as the owner to a stock photo library. Before that, she worked as a department store gift wrapper, waitress, receptionist, and the owner of a stock photography company.

Ferrone was the co-creator of the mascot Fido Dido alongside Sue Rose, Ferrone's partner at the time. He was designed in 1985 with his appearance inspired by a mutual friend of the two, and the design was initially put on t-shirts, his design later caught the attention of Patricia Field. Three years following his creation, his design caught the interest of Pepsi's agency looking for a character to market 7-Up that embodied an energy that was "cool, identifiable and really liberal in its outlook". Ferrone was responsible for naming and creating the personality of the character, and served as his "business manager". Ferrone co-created Angela Anaconda alongside Sue Rose. Ferrone described the series as a reaction to the premises she saw on TV while she was growing up and the questions she felt while comparing herself to the picture perfect families that were shown. Ferrone described Angela Anaconda as "very autobiographical, that was the most natural thing." Ferrone revealed in an interview with YouTuber Alexandra Bender that she was not involved in Angela Anaconda's eventual inclusion in Digimon: The Movie.

She served as the founder and president of Honest Entertainment, which aimed to remake Fido Dido for a modern audience. In 2002, Ferrone was slated as the co-creator and co-writer to the show Family Values alongside Tom Brady. The series was described in Variety as "wholesome ’50s-style family living in the modern world" and "'Pleasantville' gone wild". Family Values was to be produced by Honest Entertainment in collaboration with Mainframe Studios. Following the success of Angela Anaconda, Ferrone alongside Rose, were responsible for writing the Angela Anaconda companion books. Ferrone would later publish Julian Dickerson and the Higher Ups and Doreen by Doreen as an independent author. In addition, Ferrone serves as the owner of the FIDO x CIRCULAR store in Wynwood neighborhood of Miami.

== Bibliography ==
- 1988: Fido Dido 101 Or, Living Life in the Third Lane ISBN 9781853044519
- 2001: Angela Anaconda: Flour Power ISBN 9780733310454 (with Sue Rose and Barbara Calamari)
- 2001: Angela Anaconda: Pet Peeves ISBN 9780743429856 (with Sue Rose and Barbara Calamari)
- 2001: Angela Anaconda: Teacher Trouble ISBN 9780733310416 (with Sue Rose)
- 2001: Angela Anaconda: The Fright Before Christmas ISBN 9780689840555 (with Barbara Calamari)
- 2001: Nanette Manoir's Guide to Being Perfect ISBN 9780743429887 (with Sue Rose)
- 2002: Angela Anaconda: Family Ties ISBN 9780733311284 (with Sue Rose)
- 2002: Angela Anaconda: Johnny Superstar ISBN 9788804511076 (with Sue Rose)
- 2003: Angela Anaconda: Gordy Loves Gina ISBN 9780733312236 (with Rona Selby and Sue Rose)
- 2003: Angela Anaconda: My Extremely Interesting Life So Far! ISBN 9780733313448 (with Sue Rose)
- 2021: Julian Dickerson and the Higher Ups ISBN 978-1777373689 (with Tabitha Rose)
- 2024: Doreen by Doreen ISBN 978-1990700286
