= Days of Wrath (2008 film) =

- Directed by: Celia Fox
- Written by: Mitchell Kapner; Michael Markee
- Starring: Jeffrey Dean Morgan; Laurence Fishburne; Wilmer Valderrama; Jesse Garcia; Taye Diggs; David Banner; Rick Ross; Brandon T. Jackson
- Cinematography: Steve Fierberg
- Music by: Graeme Revell
- Release dates: September 17, 2008 (Los Angeles Latino); 2014 (United States)
- Running time: 94 minutes
- Country: United States
- Language: English

Days of Wrath is a 2008 American drama film starring Jeffrey Dean Morgan, Laurence Fishburne and Wilmer Valderrama. The film is directed by Celia Fox, and written by Mitchell Kapner and Michael Markee.

== Plot ==
In the Los Angeles streets, Danny Boy is a gangster without compassion or regret. He sends his gang out to carjack a rapper dubbed Cash Flow. However, in the process, his gang ends up killing Anita Terrazas, the former girlfriend of a local TV-station manager, Bryan Gordon. The victim also happens to be the mother of Mario, who is the leader of Danny Boy's own gang. Gordon's ambitious young reporter, Samantha Rodriguez, used to be involved with the local gangs, but has now cleaned up her act and lectures high school kids about the ills of gangs. Anita, Mario's grandmother, thinks he is wasting his life. She also disdains Gordon for the way he impacted her daughter's life. Soon, all the gangs band together to get Danny Boy, but he is smart, fearless and driven without conscience. The police are also after him. It is a race to see who will get him first.

== Cast ==
- Jeffrey Dean Morgan as Bryan Gordon
- Amber Valletta as Jane Summers
- Wilmer Valderrama as Danny Boy
- Laurence Fishburne as Mr. Stafford
- Jesse Garcia as Mario Terrazas
- Brandon T. Jackson as "Lil One"
- Ana Claudia Talancón as Samantha Rodriguez
- Taye Diggs as Steve Laredo
- Lupe Ontiveros as Anita Terrazas
- Rick Ross as "G Dogg"
- David Banner as Kryme
- Josue Aguirre as Enrique
- Ricardo Chavira as Detective Romeros
- Raja Fenske as Hugo
- Terry Finn as Emily Conley
- Melyssa Ford as Lysa
- Kurupt as Bobby
- Faizon Love as "Cash Flow"
- Slim Thug as "Big Bear"
- Doug Hutchison as Vadim

== Release ==
After many delays, on February 25, 2014, director and producer Celia Fox finally announced that the film would have a release late 2014.
