= Naughty or Nice (film) =

2004 television film

Naughty or Nice is an American television film starring George Lopez and James Kirk. It premiered on ABC in 2004. As of 2009, it was shown in the 25 Days of Christmas programming block on ABC Family, but it was not part of the block in 2010.

== Plot ==
A Chicago sports radio shock jock is changed by a Christmas season encounter with a 15-year-old fan who is dying of a heart condition, who forces him to be nice for a day.

== Cast ==
- George Lopez as Henry Ramiro
- James Kirk as Michael
- Lisa Vidal as Diana Ramiro
- Bianca Collins as Olivia Ramiro
- Daniel MacLean as Kevin Gilmore

== See also ==
- List of Christmas films
