= Lisa Vidal =

American actress

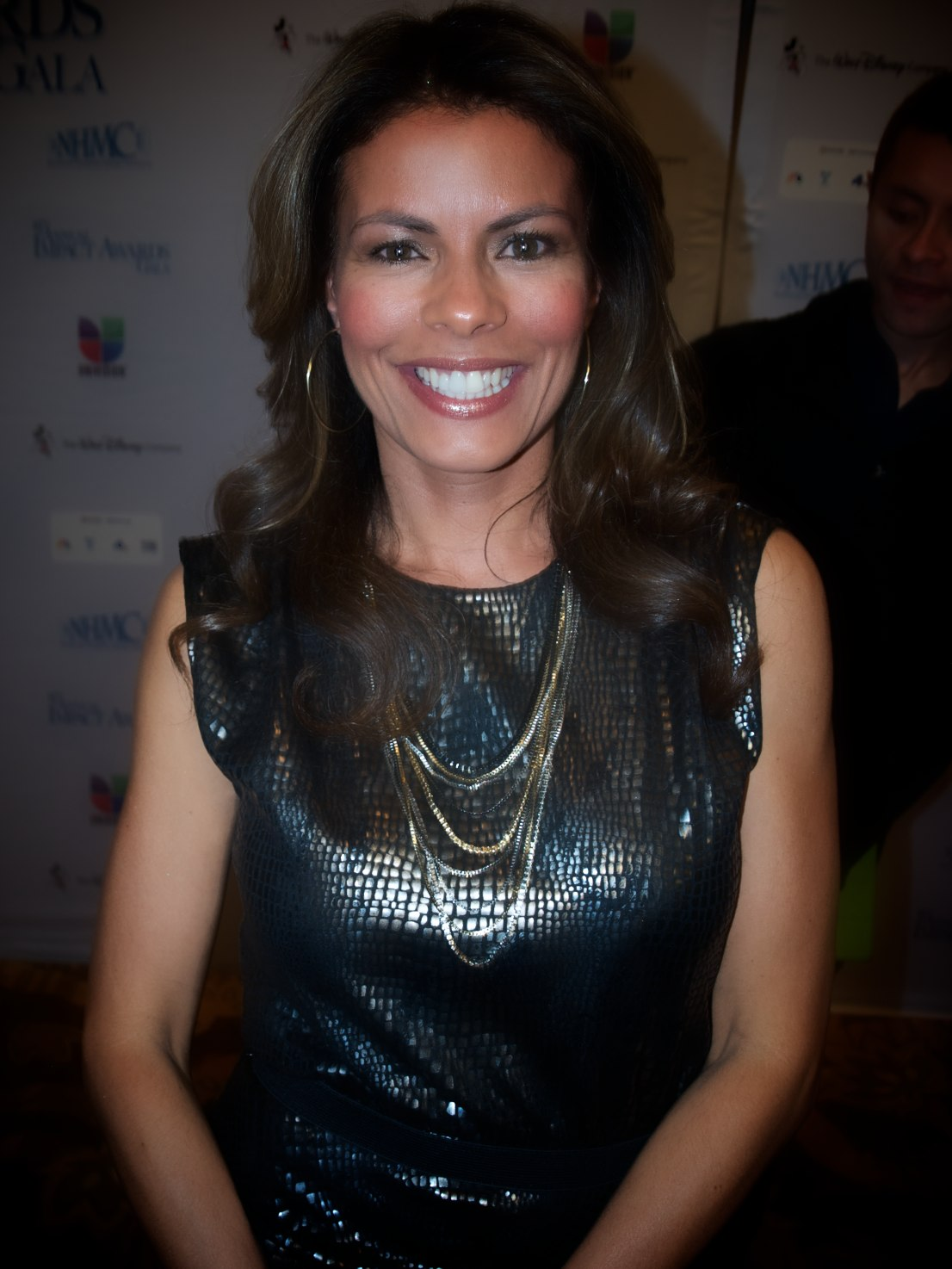
- Vidal in 2012
- Born: June 13, 1965 (age 61); New York City, U.S.
- Occupation: Actress
- Years active: 1980–present
- Children: 3
- Relatives: Christina Vidal (sister)

Lisa Vidal (born June 13, 1965) is an American actress of Puerto Rican heritage. She starred in the Lifetime crime drama series, The Division (2001–2004), and BET drama series, Being Mary Jane (2013–2019). Vidal also starred in the short-lived series, High Incident (1996–97) and The Event (2010–11), and had major recurring roles on Third Watch (1999–2001) and ER (2001–2004).

== Early life ==
Vidal's parents moved from Puerto Rico and settled in Manhattan, where Vidal and her two sisters, Christina and Tanya, were born. She also has a brother named Christian. After Vidal finished her elementary education, she auditioned and was accepted in the Fiorello H. LaGuardia High School. When she graduated, Vidal went to work with La Familia Theater Company, alongside Raul Julia and Julia Roberts. Vidal was 14 years old when she acted in the theatre series Oye Willie and later on made her feature debut with a small role in Delivery Boys. Soon, she was working in television with parts in shows such as The Cosby Show.

== Career ==
In 1992, Vidal appeared in the crime drama film, Night and the City, alongside Robert De Niro and Jessica Lange, directed by Irwin Winkler. She starred alongside Lauren Vélez and Rita Moreno in the 1994 comedy-drama film, I Like It Like That. From 1994–1995, she appeared in New York Undercover in a recurring role as a reporter named Carmen. In the series she was sister to Det. Eddie Torres, played by Michael DeLorenzo. In 1995, she did some Off-Broadway theatre and worked on The Commish. Vidal has also appeared in a number of other films, such as Mighty Aphrodite (1995), The Wonderful Ice Cream Suit (1998), and Chasing Papi (2003). She played a leading role in the 2007 psychological horror film, Dark Mirror.

Vidal was series regular on the ABC police drama, High Incident (1995–1996), and on The Brian Benben Show in 1998, and later had major recurring roles on Third Watch from 1999 to 2001 as Dr. Sarah Morales and ER from 2001 to 2004 as firefighter Sandy Lopez. From 2001 to 2004, Vidal starred opposite Bonnie Bedelia in the Lifetime drama series, The Division, for which she received the 2002 nomination for the ALMA Award in the Best Actress Category. In 2006, she had a brief role in the short-lived action series Smith as one of the federal agents looking for Ray Liotta's group of thieves. In 2010 she starred in NBC drama, The Event, playing the First Lady of the United States. Vidal also starred in a number of made-for-television movies, including The Taking of Pelham One Two Three (1998), Naughty or Nice (2004), and Odd Girl Out (2005).

In 2013, Vidal began starring opposite Gabrielle Union in the BET drama series, Being Mary Jane, playing the role of Kara Lynch, the executive producer of Mary Jane's show. The series ended in 2017, and in 2019 BET released a two-hour film finale. From 2015 to 2017, she also had a recurring role in the Fox comedy-drama series Rosewood. Vidal also guest-starred on American Horror Story, Shameless and Chicago P.D. In 2020, Vidal was cast as Mari Garcia, the lead character’s mother, in ABC romantic comedy-drama series The Baker and the Beauty.

== Personal life ==
Vidal is a breast cancer survivor. Her son, Scott Jarred Cohen, died on April 11, 2021 at the age of 28.

== Filmography ==
=== Film ===
Year	Title	Role	Notes
1984	Delivery Boys	Tina	
1986	Christmas Eve	Maria	TV movie
1988	Nightmare Beach	Girl At Pool	
1992	Night and the City	Carmen	
1994	I Like It Like That	Magdalena Soto	
1995	Mighty Aphrodite	Chorus Voice	
1997	Destination Unknown	Marisol	
1997	Fall	Sally	
1997	The Third Twin	Lisa	TV movie Nominated – ALMA Award
1998	The Wonderful Ice Cream Suit	Ramona	
1998	The Taking of Pelham One Two Three	Barbara "Babs" Cardoza	TV movie Nominated – ALMA Award
1998	Naked City: Justice with a Bullet	Lori Halloran	TV movie
1998	Naked City: A Killer Christmas	Lori Halloran	TV movie
1999	Hit and Run	Detective Rico	TV movie
1999	Active Stealth	Maria	Direct-to-video
2001	The Blue Diner	Elena	
2003	Chasing Papi	Carmen	
2004	Naughty or Nice	Diana Ramiro	TV movie
2005	Odd Girl Out	Barbara Snyder	TV movie Imagen Awards
2007	Dark Mirror	Deborah Martin	Nominated – Imagen Awards
2009	Signal Lost	TV Newswoman	
2009	Star Trek	Barracks Officer	
2010	Baby	Dominique	Short film
2011	A Day Without Rain	Ana Lanza	Short film
2014	Victor	Lila	

=== Television ===
Year	Title	Role	Notes
1980	Oye Willie	Unknown Role	PBS series
1986	"Christmas Eve"	Maria	TV movie starring Loretta Young
1987	The Cosby Show	Mrs. Miron	1 episode
1987, 1991	ABC Afterschool Special	Gloria Rodriguez	2 episodes
1988	Miami Vice	Angel Montepina	1 episode
1992	Law & Order	Lena Armendariz	1 episode
1994–1995	New York Undercover	Carmen	Recurring role, 6 episodes
1995	The Commish	Connie Muldoon	2 episodes
1996–1997	High Incident	Officer Jessica Helgado	Series regular, 22 episodes Nominated – ALMA Award (1996)
1998	The Brian Benben Show	Julie	Series regular, 8 episodes
1999	Wasteland	Unknown Role	2 episodes
1999–2001	Third Watch	Dr. Sara Morales	Recurring role, 19 episodes
2001–2004	The Division	Inspector Magdalena "Magda" Ramirez	Series regular, 88 episodes Nominated – ALMA Award (2002); Nominated – Imagen Awards (2004)
2001–2004	ER	Sandy Lopez	Recurring role, 12 episodes
2006	Boston Legal	Irma Levine	2 episodes
2006	Criminal Minds	Gina Sanchez	1 episode
2006–2007	Smith	Valez	Recurring role, 4 episodes
2007	Numb3rs	Jessica Malloy	1 episode "Burn Rate"
2009	Without a Trace	Detective Bianca Gonzalez	1 episode
2009	CSI: Miami	Patricia Busick	1 episode
2009–2010	Southland	Mia Sanchez	3 episodes
2010–2011	The Event	Christina Martinez	Series regular, 14 episodes Nominated – Imagen Awards (2011)
2011	American Horror Story: Murder House	Stacy Ramos	Episode: "Afterbirth"
2012–2013	Grimm	Lauren Castro	2 episodes
2013–2019	Being Mary Jane	Kara Lynch	Series regular, 51 episodes Imagen Awards (2016); Nominated — Imagen Awards (2017)
2014	Shameless	Maria Vidal	2 episodes
2015–2016	Rosewood	Daisie Villa	Recurring role, 11 episodes
2019	Chicago P.D.	Alexa Rivera	1 episode
2020	The Baker and the Beauty	Mari Garcia	Series regular, 9 episodes
2020—2021	Grey's Anatomy	Dr. Alma Ortiz	Recurring role, 3 episodes
