= The American Mall =

- Written by: Margaret Oberman; Tomás Romero; P.J. Hogan
- Directed by: Shawn Ku
- Starring: Nina Dobrev; Rob Mayes; Autumn Reeser; Bianca Collins; Neil Haskell; Yassmin Alers; Al Sapienza
- Theme music composer: Amber Funk; Matt LaPoint; Matthew Temple
- Country of origin: United States

Production
- Producers: Bill Borden; Mark Hansson; Arata Matsushima; Barry Rosenbush; Terry Spazek
- Cinematography: Matthew Williams
- Editor: Don Brochu
- Running time: 100 minutes

Original release
- Network: MTV
- Release: August 11, 2008

The American Mall is a 2008 MTV musical film that debuted on August 11, 2008.

== Overview ==
Produced by the same team behind Disney's High School Musical film series, The American Mall is conceptually very similar, as it focuses on several teenage characters and their daily struggles, with comic elements and musical numbers. The central plot thread of the film is that the two main characters, Ally and Joey, are musically talented but face many personal obstacles to attaining success. The teenage characters are all mall employees - Ally works at her mother's music shop, and Joey and his friends work on the night custodial staff.

The film was filmed in Provo, Utah at Provo Towne Centre.

The song "Get Your Rock On" was released as Rock Band DLC on August 19, 2008.

== Cast ==
- Nina Dobrev as Ally Shepherd
- Rob Mayes as Joey
- Autumn Reeser as Madison
- Bianca Collins as Mia
- Neil Haskell as Drew
- Yassmin Alers as Erin
- Al Sapienza as Max
- Brooke Lyons as Dori
- Bresha Webb as Penny
- Blythe Auffarth as Alexa
- Rodney To as Ben
- David Baum as Stavros
- Wade Allain-Marcus as Rick

=== Singles ===
- 2008: "Survivor" - Ally
- 2008: "Get Your Rock On" - Joey & Janitors
- 2008: "Don't Hold Back" - Ally, Joey, Mia, Madison, Ben, & Janitors
