= Angela Anaconda =

Canadian-American animated series (1999-2001)

- Genre: Comedy
- Created by: Joanna Ferrone; Sue Rose
- Voices of: Sue Rose; Ali Mukaddam; Bryn McAuley; Edward Glen; Ruby Smith-Merovitz; Richard Binsley
- Opening theme: "My Name Is Angela" (Opening theme)
- Ending theme: "My Name Is Angela" (Ending instrumental)
- Composer: John Tucker
- Countries of origin: United States; Canada
- Original language: English
- No. of seasons: 3
- No. of episodes: 65 (130 segments) (list of episodes)

Production
- Executive producers: Joanna Ferrone; Sue Rose; Neil Court; Steven DeNure; Beth Stevenson (S3)
- Producers: Beth Stevenson (S1–2); Kym Hyde (S3)
- Editors: Andrew Blyskosz; Paul Hunter
- Running time: 22 minutes
- Production company: Decode Entertainment (Note: As Angela Productions Inc. (season 1), DECODE/Angela Productions 2 Inc. (season 2), and DECODE/Angela Productions 3 Inc. (season 3))

Original release
- Network: Fox Family (US); Teletoon (Canada)
- Release: October 4, 1999 – December 10, 2001

Related
- KaBlam!

Angela Anaconda is a comedy animated television series created by Joanna Ferrone and Sue Rose that originally aired from October 4, 1999, until December 10, 2001. The series was produced by Canadian production company Decode Entertainment with animation production by C.O.R.E. Toons. 65 episodes were produced.

== Premise ==
The show focuses on the adventures of an eight-year-old girl named Angela Anaconda in the fictional American town of Tapwater Springs. Other characters include Angela's three best friends and several antagonists. The primary antagonist is Nanette Manoir.

== Episodes ==
| Season | Episodes | Originally released | |
| Season | Episodes | First released | Last released |
|---|---|---|---|
| 1 | 26 | October 4, 1999 | November 8, 1999 |
| 2 | 25 | September 11, 2000 | February 26, 2001 |
| 3 | 14 | September 10, 2001 | December 10, 2001 |

== Characters ==
=== Main ===
- Angela Anaconda (voiced by Sue Rose) is a tomboyish, imaginative eight-year-old girl who rejects the femininity commonly associated with other girls her age. She resides in the town of Tapwater Springs with her parents Bill and Gen, fraternal twin brothers Mark and Derek, and younger sister Lulu along three best friends, Johnny Abatti, Gina Lash and Gordy Rhinehart. In every episode of the series, Angela will engage in at least one daydream sequence. The majority of these feature her rivals Nanette Manoir and Mrs. Brinks, as Angela seeks vengeance on them in unrealistic ways.
- Johnny Abatti (voiced by Al Mukadam) is a pleasant but dim Italian-American boy. His parents are never seen in the show and he appears to be under the care of his grandmother Carmella and uncle Nicky. Nanette Manoir has a crush on him and tries to flirt with him frequently, referring to him as "John" and inviting him to Manoir's exclusive events. Despite this preferential treatment, Johnny remains utterly ignorant about Nanette's affections.
- Gina Lash (voiced by Bryn McAuley) is the smartest child in her grade. Possessing encyclopedic knowledge, an impressive vocabulary and a voracious appetite, Gina routinely dispenses reason and insight to her friends. However, she will always participate in whatever scheme they are partaking. Gina shares many interests with her friends, but her thirst for knowledge has led her to pursue a variety of other hobbies; she owns a microscope and other scientific paraphernalia.
- Gordy Rhinehart (voiced by Edward Glen) is a kind, sensitive and artistic boy with asthma who prefers pressing flowers, housework and writing poetry instead of "dangerous" activities such as tag or hide-and-seek. He has a fondness for ballet and nature, and embraces all things pretty and lovely. He is the total opposite of his beefy and macho ex-Army soldier father Coach Rhinehart. Despite being so different from each other, their father/son relationship is very strong and they show authentic love and concern for one another.
- Nanette Manoir (voiced by Ruby Smith-Merovitz) is Angela's primary arch-nemesis and is the teacher's pet who speaks with a snobbish faux-French accent. Her hair is golden blonde and styled into extra-length Victorian-style ringlets in emulation of her mother's look. Nanette's parents fail to see how rotten their daughter truly is at school, as she is spoiled and never punished for things which she does wrong.
- Mrs. Ephigenia Brinks (voiced by Richard Binsley) is a third grade teacher with a rather masculine voice. She wears a grey beehive wig, which hides her short ginger hair and dresses in a long-skirted schoolmarm dress. She is easily manipulated and plays favourites, her decisions always favoring Nanette. Mrs. Brinks dislikes Angela and is very strict and hard-boiled with her.

=== Recurring ===
- Astronaut Bob (voiced by Robert Smith) is a former astronaut who was active during the height of the Space Race and walked on the Moon. He currently spends his time as a volunteer for the town's space museum, and lending his likeness to boxes of the cereal (Astro Nutties) as well as other products and possessions.
- Candy May (voiced by Linda Kash) is an incredibly dim kid who appears to cut her own hair and wears a shirt with a unicorn decal on it. She has long light brown hair in a ribbon. She hesitates a lot, draws her words out, and often confuses herself.
- Carmella "Nonna" Abatti (voiced by Linda Kash) is Johnny's grandmother and chief proprietor of Abatti's Pizza. A talented cook and nurturer, Nonna is very hospitable to Johnny and his friends.
- Coach Rhinehart (voiced by Robert Smith) is Gordy's hypermasculine father as well as a huge sports enthusiast, ex-Army officer, football coach, Nature Survival Counselor, and PE teacher of Tapwater Springs Elementary School. He speaks with a stereotypical coach/drill sergeant voice and is normally shown dressed in a bright orange tracksuit.
- Conrad "Connie" Brinks (voiced by Richard Binsley) is the henpecked husband of Ephegenia Brinks. In contrast to his wife, Conrad is skinny, soft-spoken, and even tempered. He is very loving and patient especially towards his wife, and dismisses her shouting with a resigned "yes dear".
- Bunny (voiced by Julie Lemieux) and Howell Manoir (voiced by Robert Smith) are the parents of Nanette Manoir. Both are very overindulgent of their daughter, and most of the time they fail to notice let alone punish Nanette's rotten demeanour.
- January Cole (voiced by Olivia Garratt) and Karlene Trainor (voiced by Annick Obonsawin) are Nanette's lackeys who follow her around wherever she goes. Donning bouffant hairdos, preppy clothing, and beauty marks, they are very concerned with their appearance and look to Nanette for fashion guidance.
- Jimmy Jamal (voiced by Kevin Duhaney) is an athletic Black boy in Angela's class. He is often seen playing a handheld video game (similar to Nintendo) and talking about his Turbo Trainers, which make him run very fast. He is the son of the mayor of Tapwater Springs.
- Josephine Praline (voiced by Cara Pifko) is a devout Catholic who acts as a moral counselor for her classmates. She is loving and forgiving, but stern when she sees prejudice. Josephine comes from a large religious family of at least 19 siblings.
- Derek and Mark Anaconda (both voiced by Robert Tinkler) are Angela's twin teenage brothers. Though physically and intellectually similar, Mark has blonde hair while Derek has brown hair. Moreover, Derek's voice is higher than Mark's. Both of the brothers are the secondary antagonists of the show, constantly bullying and downgrading Angela and her friends.
- Nicholas "Uncle Nicky" Abatti (voiced by Ron Rubin) is Johnny's swinging bachelor uncle and co-owner of Abatti's Pizza. While generally good-natured towards his nephew as well as Angela, Gina and Gordy, Uncle Nicky is also childish, and obsessed with fast women, speedy cars, gambling and disco.
- Geneva "Gen" (voiced by Allegra Fulton) and William "Bill" Anaconda (voiced by Diego Matamoros) are the parents of Mark, Derek, Angela and Lulu Anaconda. Though Bill enjoys inventing, none of his inventions have really taken off (save for the Food Rejuvenator 3000, whose potential success he sabotaged in the end out of fear that success would spoil his family). To make ends meet, he works as a salesman selling ceramic dancing pigs and expandable foam in a can. Geneva is a struggling artist who gets by on commissions and teaching positions at the community college. In spite of being busy with their respective jobs and financial situation, both are caring and provide all of their children with love and support.

== Production and development ==
=== Conception ===
Created by Joanna Ferrone and Sue Rose, the show first started as a series of shorts on Nickelodeon's animated sketch series, KaBlam!. Decode Entertainment and now-defunct C.O.R.E. Toons developed Angela Anaconda into a long-form series in 1999.

=== Animation ===
The show features cutout animation, in which characters are made using grayscale photographs. C.O.R.E. Toons used Elastic Reality software to superimpose models' faces onto computer-generated bodies and backgrounds.

An immersive interactive online companion project for Angela Anaconda was developed by producer Dan Fill and the team at Decode Entertainment. Angela Anaconda Online went on to be nominated for a BAFTA.

== Telecast and home release ==
The show formerly aired on Fox Family (now as Freeform) until 2001, along Nickelodeon and Starz Kids and Family in the United States. Teletoon aired it in Canada. Internationally, the series was broadcast on Nickelodeon. In the UK, Angela Anaconda aired on Cartoon Network, Channel 4 and Pop.

Although the series has not had a complete DVD release, the first 20 episodes were distributed across four volumes in Australia, where the program is broadcast on Nickelodeon and ABC Kids.

In France, an Angela Anaconda channel is available on Pluto TV.

As of 2025, the show is now streamed for free on The Roku Channel.

== Reception ==
=== Critical response ===
Angela Anaconda received high ratings and mixed to negative reviews from critics. Barb Stuewe of The Ledger noted that while "the humor doesn't always come off," the show "is sometimes quite funny." Evan Levine of the Rome News-Tribune was critical of the show's look and feel, stating that "the series' unique, cut-out style of animation seems trendy for its own sake." Scott Moore of The Washington Post called Angela Anaconda "more imaginative than anything ever seen in art class." Co-creator Sue Rose noted in an interview with The New York Times that despite having a primarily female cast, the show had become popular with both sexes. She writes, "the most frequent feedback we get is from parents of boys ... they say: 'My boys watch it and they love it. I never thought they would.' These are not just girls' shows, they're kids shows."

The Sydney Morning Herald gave it the award for best children's show of 2001, calling it a "cute and sassy animation".

=== Ratings ===
During the series' time on Fox Family, it received consistently high ratings and was commonly marathoned by the channel.

=== Awards and nominations ===
| Year | Presenter | Category | Status | Ref. |
|---|---|---|---|---|
| 2000 | Annecy Awards | Best TV Animation Program | Won | |
| 2000 | 27th Daytime Emmy Awards | Outstanding Special Class Animated Program | Nominated | |
| 2000 | Gemini Awards | Best Animated Program or Series | Won | |
| 2001 | British Academy Children's Awards | International | Nominated | |
| 2001 | 28th Daytime Emmy Awards | Outstanding Special Class Animated Program | Nominated | |
| 2002 | British Academy Children's Awards | International | Nominated | |
