= Fido Dido =

Cartoon character

- First appearance: 1985
- Created by: Joanna Ferrone; Sue Rose

In-universe information
- Species: Human
- Gender: Male

Fido Dido (/ˈfaɪdoʊ ˈdaɪdoʊ/ or /ˈfiːdoʊ ˈdiːdoʊ/) is a cartoon character of a male youth created by Joanna Ferrone and Sue Rose.

== History ==
Rose first doodled the character in 1985 on a napkin in a restaurant. Ferrone came up with the character's name on her way to work the next day. The two later stenciled Fido on T-shirts. These T-shirts became very popular in New York, and featured the character's official mantra: "Fido is for Fido. Fido is against no one. Fido is youth. Fido has no age. Fido sees everything. Fido judges nothing. Fido is smart. Fido is innocent. Fido is powerful. Fido comes from the past. Fido is the future".

== Advertising ==
The character was licensed to PepsiCo in 1988 but the character did not receive much attention or popularity until the early 1990s, when he appeared on numerous products, particularly stationery and 7 Up ads and boxer shorts. In the United States, he was replaced with Cool Spot as the 7-Up brand mascot, due to the Dr Pepper Snapple Group owning 7-Up in that area. Because of this, Fido Dido was instead used to promote Slice, another drink by PepsiCo.

He reappeared in the 2000s on cans and advertising for 7-Up worldwide. In 2018, Fido Dido reappeared in the Vintage Series cans and in 2022, Fido Dido reappeared to star in a series of new commercials.

Fido Dido was used on PepsiCo's Turkish soft drink Fruko.

=== Other uses ===
Fido Dido appeared in Saturday morning cartoon promos on CBS. His bumpers on CBS started in 1990 and lasted until 1993.

The graphic novel Fido Dido: Life In the Third Lane was published in paperback in 1989.

A large mural of Fido Dido was painted on the side of a building in the city of Guayaquil, Ecuador, in the early 1990s and was nearly erased by the passing of time. After a news article was published by El Universo in March 2019, the mural was repainted to refresh the image.

In 1992, Fido Dido appeared in his own magazine in the United Kingdom. The first edition introduced his family, and was titled "Meet the Fidos". It was published by Ravette Publishing.

In 1993, a video game called Fido Dido was made by Kaneko and Bits Studios for the Super NES and Sega Genesis. Despite being completed, it was never officially released, because the publisher Kaneko's United States branch shut down in the summer of 1994. By the early 2000s the Genesis version of the game had been made available online unofficially, and could be played using emulators. There was a Neopets sponsor game starring Fido Dido.

In the early 1990s, Fido Dido had a comic strip in the teenage magazine YM. Pepper Ann, a spinoff of the Fido Dido strip, would later be adapted into a Disney TV series.

Fido Dido appears in the 2009 animated short Logorama, as a bystander.
