= Sue Rose =

American cartoonist, screenwriter, and voice actress

- Born: Susan Rose; Hudson, New York, U.S.
- Education: Hudson High School (New York)
- Alma mater: Hartford Art School, School of the Museum of Fine Arts Boston
- Occupations: Cartoonist, animator, voice actress, TV script writer
- Years active: 1985–2017; 2024–present
- Known for: Fido Dido (1985); Pepper Ann (1997–2001); Angela Anaconda (1996, 1999–2001); Unfabulous (2004–07)

Susan Rose is an American cartoonist, animator, voice actress and television writer. She created the character Fido Dido with Joanna Ferrone and created the children's television programs Pepper Ann, Angela Anaconda (with Joanna Ferrone) and Unfabulous. She provided the voice of Angela Anaconda.

== Early life ==
Rose was born in Hudson, New York and attended Hudson High School. After graduating in 1971, she attended Boston School of the Museum of Fine Arts and the Hartford Art School.

== Career ==
Rose and friend Joanna Ferrone first developed the character Fido Dido in 1985, after Rose drew him on a cocktail napkin at a restaurant. Ferrone named him "Fido Dido". They later stenciled Fido on T-shirts with the credo: "Fido is for Fido, Fido is against no one". Fido Dido was licensed to PepsiCo in 1988 and appeared on numerous products.

In 1996, Rose created the animated television series Pepper Ann. The series was produced by Walt Disney Television Animation and aired on Disney's One Saturday Morning block, debuting on September 13, 1997, on ABC. Pepper Ann began life as a comic strip created by Rose in the early 1990s for YM magazine. The animated series received popular and critical acclaim and earned numerous awards including Parent's Choice and Girls Inc.

Rose and Ferrone later created the animated television show Angela Anaconda, which aired on Fox Family Channel from 1999 to 2001. Rose was also the voice of Angela. The cut-out animation show also aired on Teletoon in Canada. The show earned Rose numerous awards and nominations, including nominations for Young Artist Award in 2000 and 2001, a Gemini Award in 2000, nominations for Daytime Emmys in 2000 and 2001, a nomination for an Annie Award in 2001, and a nomination for a BAFTA Award in 2002.

In 2004, Rose's live-action tween sitcom Unfabulous debuted on Nickelodeon. The show starred Emma Roberts and ran through 2007.

== Filmography ==
Year	TV show/film	Role	Character voice
1997–2001	Pepper Ann	Creator; Executive producer Writer (one episode); Art director	Moira, Fuzzy (five episodes)
1999–2001	Angela Anaconda	Co-creator; Executive producer Writer; Voice actress	Angela Anaconda
2002–2003	Totally Spies!	Voice actress	Angelina
2002–2008	The Sleepover Club	Creator	
2004–2007	Unfabulous	Creator; Executive producer Writer	
2005	American Dragon: Jake Long	Voice actress	Additional voice (one episode)
2013	Doc McStuffins	Writer – (four episodes)	
2016–17	Kuu Kuu Harajuku	Writer – (five episodes)	
2024	Primos	Voice actress	
2025	Common Side Effects	Voice actress	Hildy
